= NOAA-21 =

NASA/NOAA weather satellite

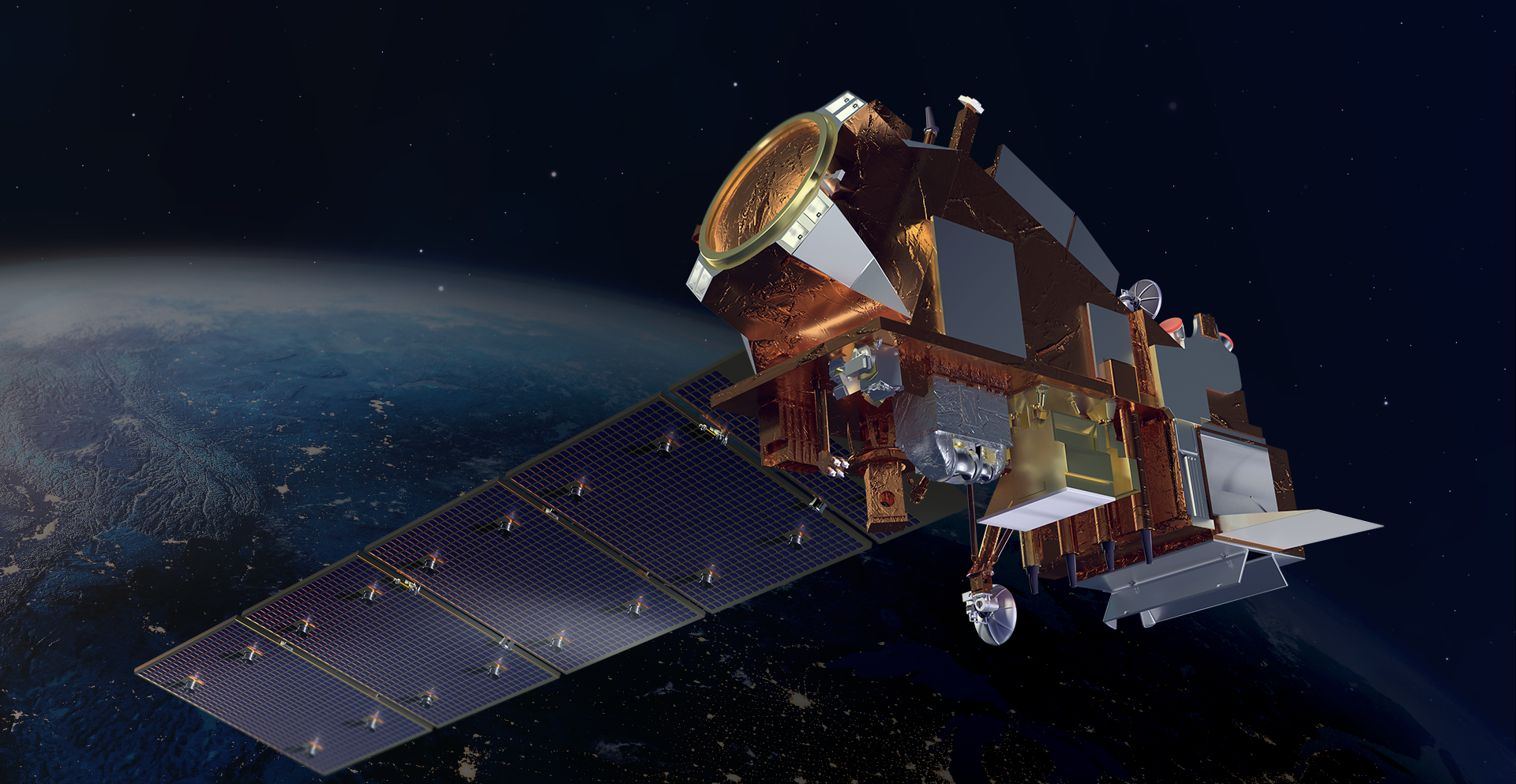
- Artist's rendering of the NOAA-21 satellite in orbit.
- Names: JPSS-2; Joint Polar Satellite System-2
- Mission type: Weather
- Operator: NOAA
- COSPAR ID: 2022-150A
- SATCAT no.: 54234
- Website: http://www.jpss.noaa.gov/
- Mission duration: 7 years (planned) 4 years and 9 days (elapsed)

Spacecraft properties
- Spacecraft type: Joint Polar Satellite System
- Bus: LEOStar-3
- Manufacturer: Northrop Grumman Innovation Systems
- Launch mass: 2,930 kg (6,460 lb)

Start of mission
- Launch date: 10 November 2022, 09:49:00 UTC
- Rocket: Atlas V 401
- Launch site: Vandenberg, SLC-3E
- Contractor: United Launch Alliance

Orbital parameters
- Reference system: Geocentric orbit
- Regime: Sun-synchronous orbit
- Altitude: 833 km
- Inclination: 98.80°
- Period: 102.00 minutes

Instruments
Instruments
- ATMS: Advanced Technology Microwave Sounder
- CrIS: Cross-track Infrared Sounder
- OMPS: Ozone Mapping and Profiler Suite
- VIIRS: Visible Infrared Imaging Radiometer Suite
- JPSS-2 Mission Insignia Large Strategic Science Missions; Earth Science Division Joint Polar Satellite System

This visualization illustrates how NOAA-20 orbit phasing and raising works relative to Suomi NPP, the notional way can be maneuvered a quarter-orbit along-track separation from NOAA-20 prior to launch of JPSS-2, and how a three-satellite constellation operates on a Sun-synchronous orbit node-crossing including sensor-swath footprints as the world turns below.

NOAA-21, designated JPSS-2 prior to launch, is the second satellite in National Oceanic and Atmospheric Administration (NOAA)'s latest series of U.S. polar-orbiting, non-geosynchronous, environmental satellites, known as the Joint Polar Satellite System (JPSS). Launched on 10 November 2022, along with LOFTID, NOAA-21 now operates in the same orbit as NOAA-20, that used to include Suomi NPP. It travels in a polar orbit, crossing the equator approximately 14 times a day, and provides complete global coverage twice a day.

NOAA-21 ensures the continuity of satellite-based observations and products for NOAA's Polar Operational Environmental Satellites (POES; ended 2025) and Suomi NPP (ended 1 November 2026) systems.

The JPSS Ground System was maintained to support NOAA-21, following the model established for NOAA-20. The instruments on board include VIIRS, CrIS, ATMS, and OMPS. It was originally planned to carry the Radiation Budget Instrument (RBI), but that project was canceled by NASA in 2018.

== Development ==
On 24 March 2015, NASA announced that Orbital ATK would build one, and possibly three, Joint Polar Satellite System spacecraft. In winning the contract, Orbital unseated the incumbent Ball Aerospace & Technologies which had built NOAA-20 (JPSS-1) and Suomi NPP. NOAA-21 is based on Orbital ATK's LEOStar-3 spacecraft bus platform, which was also used on Landsat 8. The second Ice, Cloud and Land Elevation satellite (ICESat-2) and the Landsat 9 spacecraft are also based on the LEOStar-3 and are being built at Orbital ATK's Gilbert facility at the same time.

The launch services contract was awarded to United Launch Alliance (ULA) on 3 March 2017.

== Launch ==
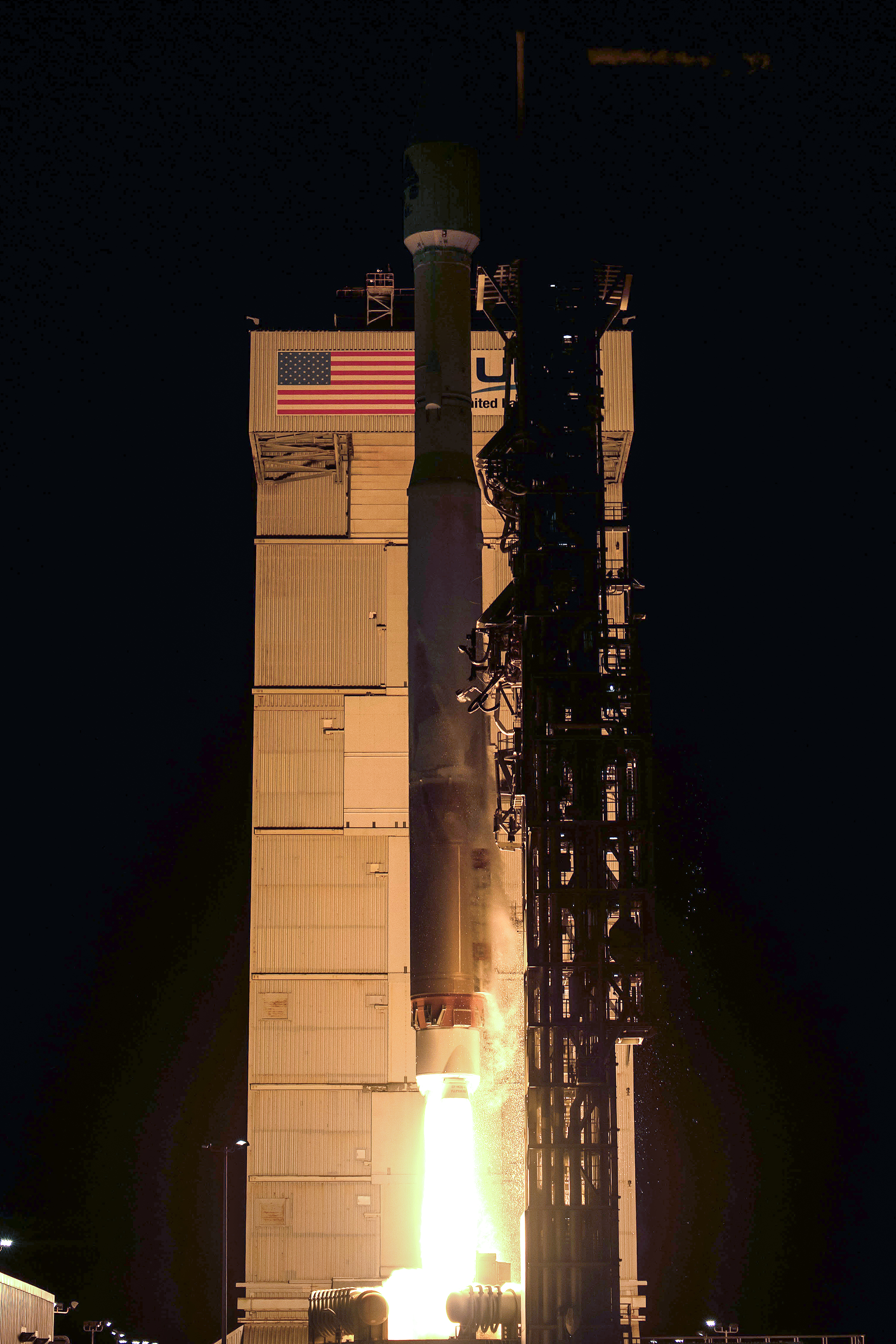
Launch of NOAA-21

NOAA-21 was launched on 10 November 2022 on an Atlas V 401 rocket from Vandenberg Space Launch Complex 3 (SLC-3E) at Vandenberg Space Force Base in California. It was the final launch of an Atlas V from Vandenberg Space Force Base.

NOAA-21's launch date had been pushed back several times. In May 2022 it slipped a little more than a month when Visible Infrared Imaging Radiometer Suite (VIIRS) experienced a test equipment anomaly during thermal vacuum (TVAC) testing. It slipped again from 1 November following ULA discovering that the battery on the Atlas V's Centaur upper stage needed to be replaced. Launch and activation were hampered by a solar array deployment failure that was detected a few hours after launch.

A few weeks after launch, NOAA-21 experienced an anomaly with the on board KA transmitter system resulting in a data outage, that was partially mitigated with the use of X-Band High Rate Data (HRD) received over Svalbard. After nearly two months of troubleshooting, the back-up Ka-band Transmitter was initialized on 2 February 2023 and normal operations resumed.

The spacecraft went through a post-launch testing period of ten months, during which all the spacecraft's primary systems were checked, and it was officially declared operational on 8 November 2023.

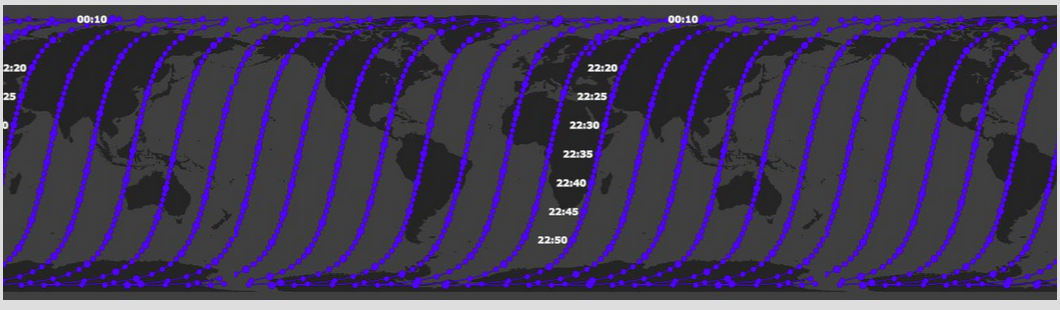
NOAA-21's descending orbital path

== Instruments ==
The NOAA-21 sensors/instruments are:

=== Advanced Technology Microwave Sounder (ATMS) ===
The Advanced Technology Microwave Sounder (ATMS) is a cross-track scanner with 22 channels. It provides sounding observations needed to retrieve atmospheric moisture and temperature profiles for real-time civilian weather forecasting and to provide continuity of these measurements for climate monitoring. It is a lighter-weight version of the previous Advanced Microwave Sounding Unit (AMSU) and Microwave Humidity Sounder (MHS) instruments flown on previous NOAA and NASA satellites with no new performance capabilities.

=== Cross-track Infrared Sounder (CrIS) ===
The Cross-track Infrared Sounder (CrIS) instrument is used to produce high-resolution, three-dimensional moisture, pressure, and temperature profiles. These profiles help scientists enhance weather forecasting models and are used in both short- and long-term weather forecasting. They are used to improve the understanding of regular climate phenomena such as El Niño and La Niña. This is a brand-new instrument with breakthrough performance. CrIS represents a significant enhancement over NOAA's legacy infrared sounder — High Resolution Infrared Radiation Sounder (HIRS) and is meant to be a counterpart to the Infrared Atmospheric Sounding Interferometer (IASI).

=== Ozone Mapping and Profiler Suite (OMPS) ===
The Ozone Mapping and Profiler Suite (OMPS) is a suite of three hyperspectral instruments that are extending the 25-plus year total-ozone and ozone-profile records. Ozone-assessment researchers and policy makers use these records to track the health of the ozone layer. Better testing and monitoring of the complex chemistry involved in ozone destruction near the troposphere is made possible by the improved vertical resolution of OMPS data products. OMPS products, when used with cloud predictions, also produce better ultraviolet index forecasts. OMPS carries on a long tradition of space-borne measurements of ozone beginning in 1970 with the Nimbus 4 satellite and continuing with the Solar Backscatter Ultraviolet (SBUV and SBUV/2), Total Ozone Mapping Spectrometer (TOMS) and Ozone Monitoring Instrument (OMI) instruments on various NASA, NOAA, and international satellites. Over the more than 30-year period in which these instruments have been operating, they have provided a very detailed and important long-term record of the global distribution of ozone.

=== Visible Infrared Imaging Radiometer Suite (VIIRS) ===
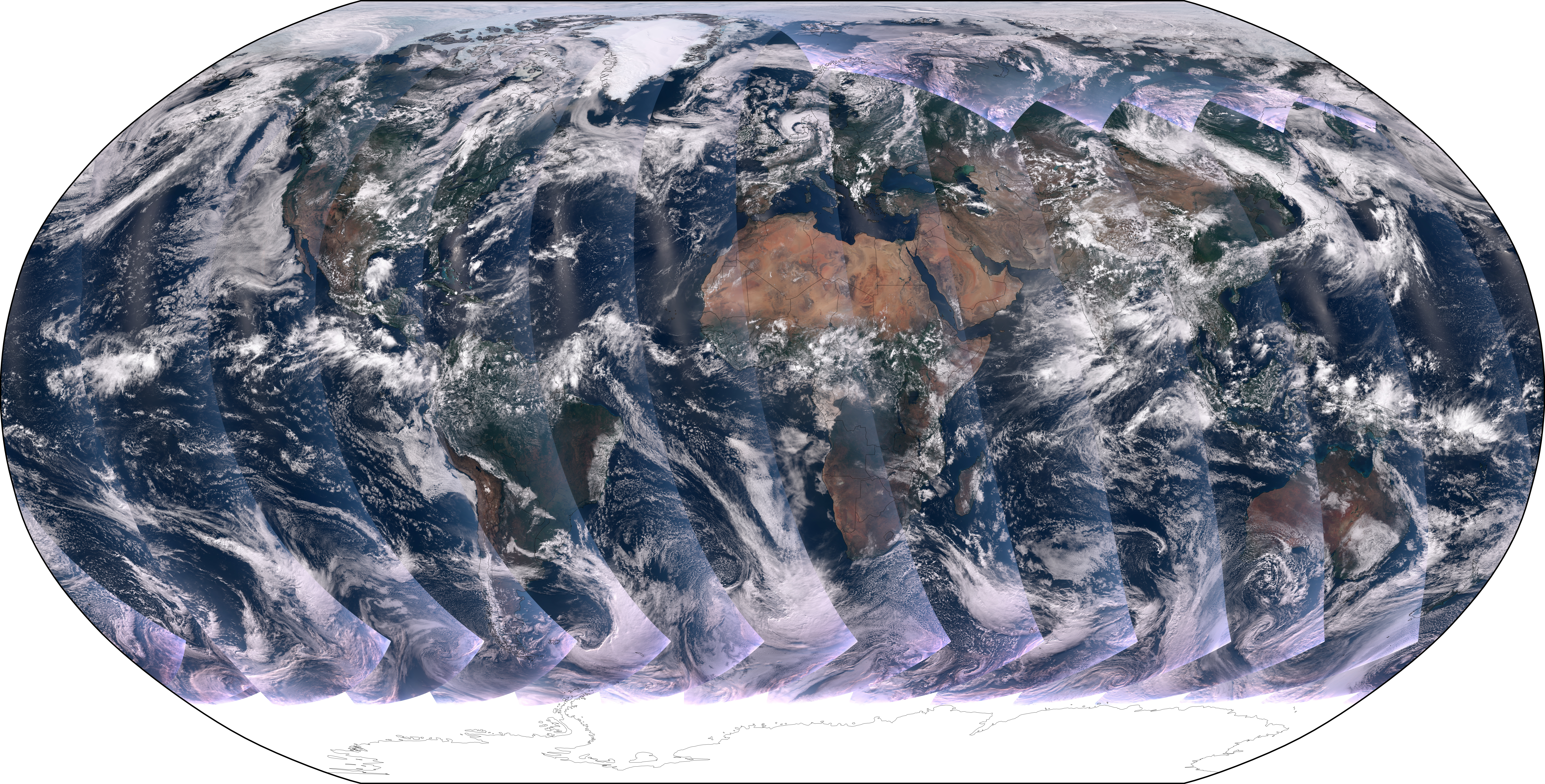
Mosaic of images captured by the VIIRS instrument

The Visible Infrared Imaging Radiometer Suite (VIIRS) takes global visible and infrared observations of land, ocean, and atmosphere parameters at high temporal resolution. Developed from the Moderate Resolution Imaging Spectroradiometer (MODIS) instrument flown on the Aqua and Terra Earth Observing System (EOS) satellites, it has significantly better performance than the Advanced very-high-resolution radiometer (AVHRR) previously flown on NOAA satellites. VIIRS Focal Planes were manufactured by Raytheon Vision Systems in Santa Barbara, California.

=== Discontinued instruments ===
==== Radiation Budget Instrument (RBI) ====
The Radiation Budget Instrument (RBI) was a planned scanning radiometer capable of measuring Earth's reflected sunlight and emitted thermal radiation. RBI was to fly on NOAA-21, but it experienced significant technical issues and substantial cost growth. Because of these challenges, and the low risk of experiencing a gap in this data record due to having two relatively new instruments in orbit at the time, NASA decided to discontinue development of RBI. RBI struggled from the beginning. It was originally to be on NOAA's proposed Polar Free Flyer satellite, but in 2014, Congress, led by its Republican majority, refused to fund the satellite. After moving the instrument to NOAA-21 and awarding the contract for development in June 2014, NASA almost immediately began the process of dropping the sensor. NASA halted development in 2015 citing cost and technical concerns. In 2017, it was defunded in the Trump administration's first budget because of "schedule and technical difficulties". RBI got a brief reprieve when the Senate stated that if NASA determined that RBI could be ready for inclusion on the spacecraft and stay within budget it could continue with reprogrammed funding. But on 26 January 2018, NASA announced their intention to discontinue development of RBI and shortly thereafter it was again left unfunded in the Trump administration's FY 2019 budget.
