= Joint Polar Satellite System =

Constellation of American meteorology satellites

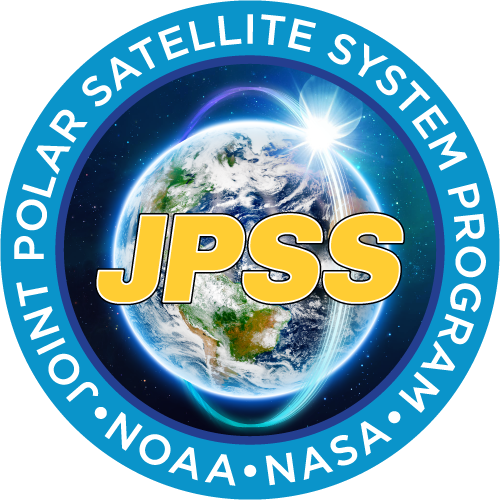
Logo for the Joint Polar Satellite System (JPSS)

The Joint Polar Satellite System (JPSS) is the latest generation of U.S. polar-orbiting, non-geosynchronous, environmental satellites. JPSS provides the global environmental data used in numerical weather prediction models for forecasts, and scientific data used for climate monitoring. JPSS aids in fulfilling the mission of the U.S. National Oceanic and Atmospheric Administration (NOAA), an agency of the Department of Commerce. Data and imagery obtained from the JPSS increases timeliness and accuracy of public warnings and forecasts of climate and weather events, thus reducing the potential loss of human life and property and advancing the national economy. The JPSS is developed by the National Aeronautics and Space Administration (NASA) for the National Oceanic and Atmospheric Administration (NOAA), who is responsible for operation of JPSS. Five satellites are planned for the JPSS constellation of satellites. JPSS satellites are flown, and the scientific data from JPSS is processed, by the JPSS – Common Ground System (JPSS-CGS).

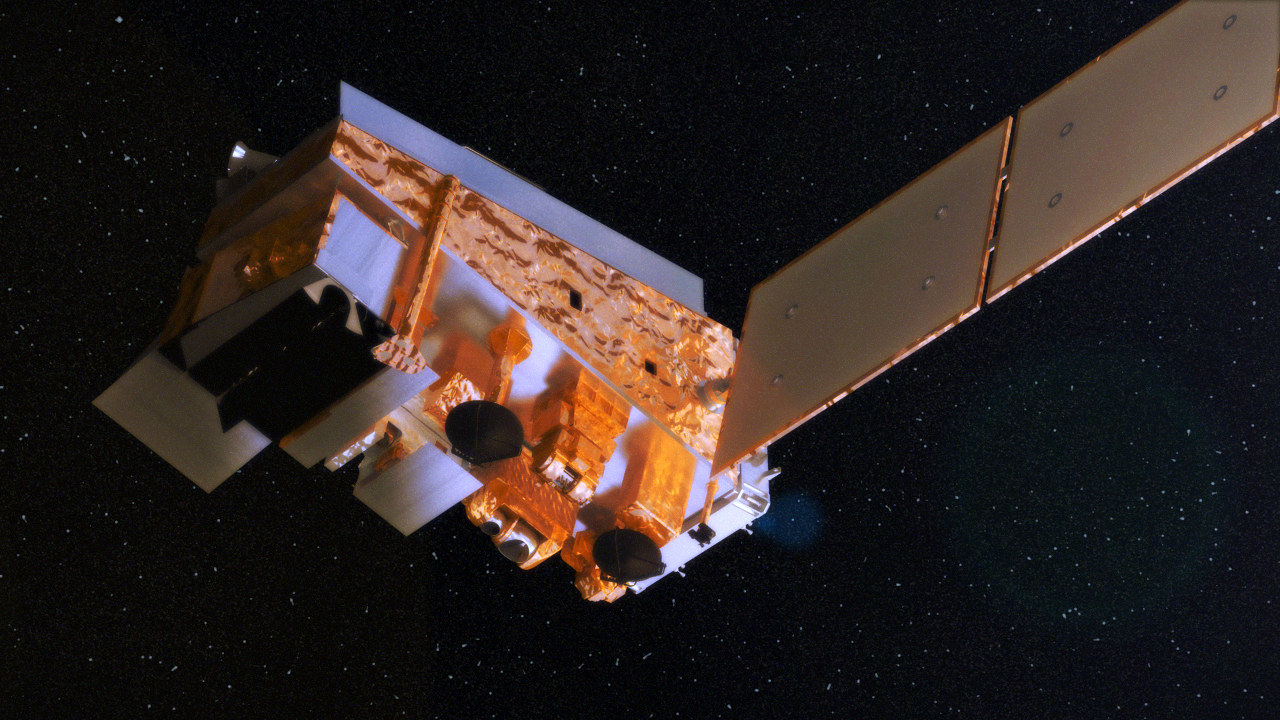
Artist illustration of the Suomi NPP Satellite

The first satellite in the JPSS is the Suomi NPP satellite, which launched on October 28, 2011.

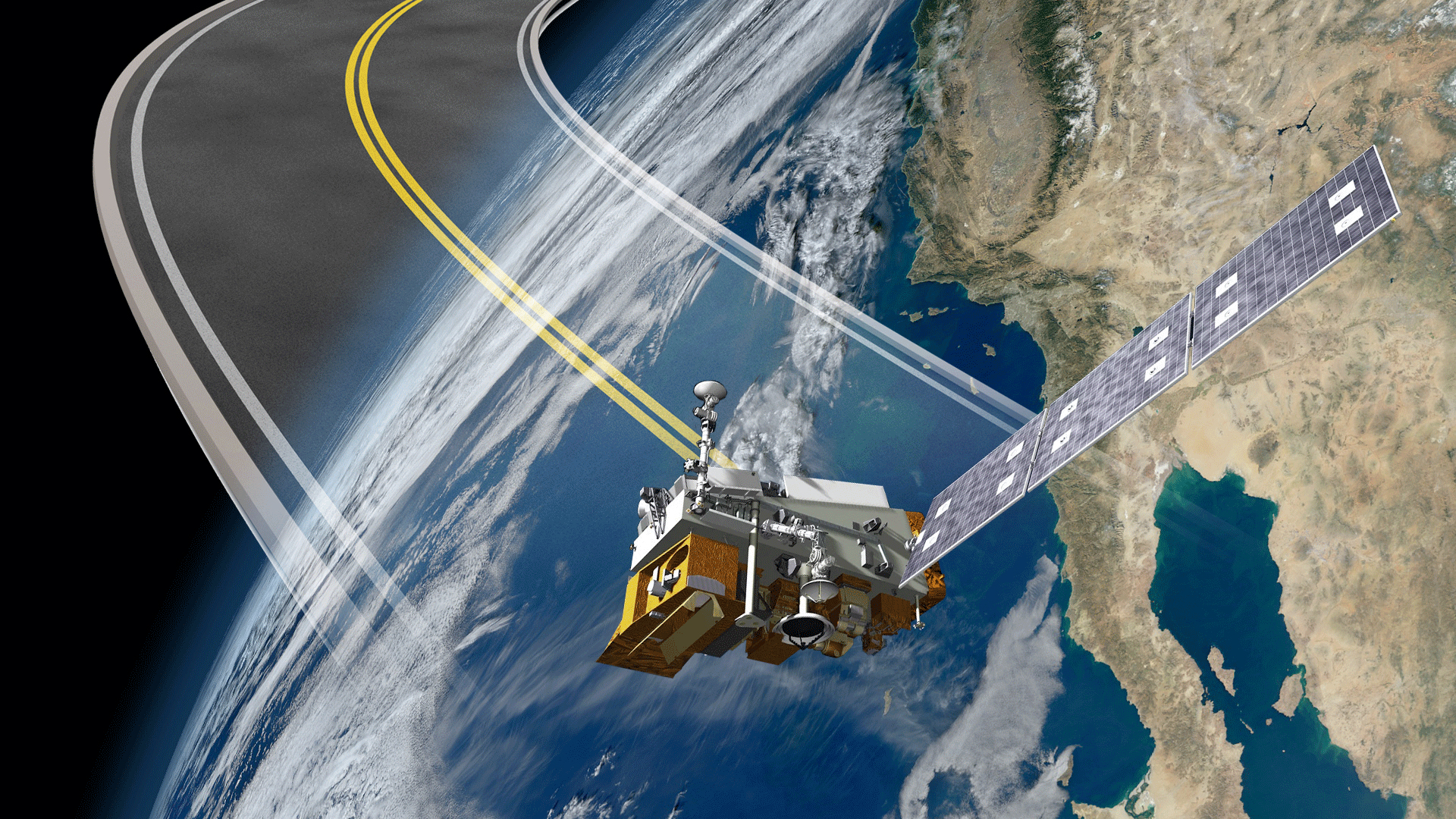
Artist illustration of the NOAA-20 Satellite

This was followed by JPSS-1, which was launched on November 18, 2017, three years later than originally anticipated when the contract was awarded in 2010. On November 21, 2017, after reaching its final orbit, JPSS-1 was renamed NOAA-20. The third satellite has been launched on November 10, 2022 with two more satellites scheduled to be launched.

In addition, the TSI Calibration Transfer Experiment, launched on the U.S. Air Force Space Test Program Satellite-3 (STPSat-3) on November 19, 2013, is also part of JPSS.

== History ==
The United States has had two main polar orbiting satellite programs which both began in the 1960s. NOAA's POES (Polar Orbiting Operational Environmental Satellite) series and the USAF's DMSP (Defense Metrological Satellite Program). JPSS was created by the White House in February 2010 following the restructuring dissolution of the National Polar-orbiting Environmental Satellite System (NPOESS) program. The original satellite orbit concept from the NPOESS program was divided between two sponsor agencies: NOAA was given responsibility for the afternoon orbit, while environmental measurements from morning orbit were to be obtained from the Defense Weather Satellite System (DWSS). DWSS was cancelled in April 2012. The military will continue to rely on the Air Force Defense Meteorological Satellite Program (DMSP) constellation of satellites until the Weather System Follow-on satellites are operational.

An independent review team (IRT) was assigned to provide an independent assessment of the total NOAA satellite enterprise, including JPSS. Its findings were published in 2012.

== Purpose ==
Data imagery obtained from the Joint Polar Satellite System will increase timeliness and accuracy of public warnings such as predictions of climate, weather, and natural hazards, thus reducing the potential loss of human life, property and advancing the national economy.

JPSS will replace the current Polar-orbiting Operational Environmental Satellites (POES), managed by NOAA and the ground processing component of both POES and the Defense Meteorological Satellite Program (DMSP). Operational environmental requirements from polar-orbit are also met by the NPOESS Preparatory Project (NPP) (now called the Suomi National Polar-orbiting Partnership or Suomi NPP or S-NPP), which launched October 28, 2011.

Data from the JPSS system shall be made freely available, by the United States Government, to domestic and international users, in support of U.S. commitments for the Global Earth Observing System of Systems (GEOSS).

== Instruments ==
Ball Aerospace performing integration and performance testing

The JPSS satellites will carry a suite of sensors designed to collect meteorological, oceanographic, climatological, and solar-geophysical observations of the earth land, oceans, atmosphere, and near-earth space.

JPSS Sensors/Instruments:

Visible Infrared Imaging Radiometer Suite (VIIRS)
takes global visible and infrared observations of land, ocean, and atmosphere parameters at high temporal resolution. Developed from the MODIS instrument flown on the Aqua and Terra Earth Observing System satellites, it has significantly better performance than the AVHRR radiometer previously flown on NOAA satellites.
Cross-track Infrared Sounder (CrIS)
produces high-resolution, three-dimensional temperature, pressure, and moisture profiles. These profiles will be used to enhance weather forecasting models, and will facilitate both short- and long-term weather forecasting. Over longer timescales, they will help improve understanding of climate phenomena such as El Niño and La Niña. This is a brand-new instrument with breakthrough performance. CrIS represents a significant enhancement over NOAA's legacy infrared sounder—High Resolution Infrared Radiation Sounders (HIRS) and is meant to be a counterpart to the Infrared Atmospheric Sounding Interferometer (IASI).
Advanced Technology Microwave Sounder (ATMS)
a cross-track scanner with 22 channels, provides sounding observations needed to retrieve profiles of atmospheric temperature and moisture for civilian operational weather forecasting as well as continuity of these measurements for climate monitoring purposes. It is a lighter-weight version of the previous AMSU and MHS instruments flown on previous NOAA and NASA satellites with no new performance capabilities.
Ozone Mapping and Profiler Suite (OMPS)
an advanced suite of three hyperspectral instruments, extends the 25-plus year total-ozone and ozone-profile records. These records are used by ozone-assessment researchers and policy makers to track the health of the ozone layer. The improved vertical resolution of OMPS data products allows for better testing and monitoring of the complex chemistry involved in ozone destruction near the troposphere. OMPS products, when combined with cloud predictions, also help produce better ultraviolet index forecasts. OMPS carries on a long tradition of space borne measurements of ozone beginning in 1970 with the Nimbus 4 satellite and continuing with the Solar Backscatter Ultraviolet (SBUV and SBUV/2), Total Ozone Mapping Spectrometer (TOMS) and Ozone Monitoring Instrument (OMI) instruments on various NASA, NOAA, and international satellites. Over the more than 30-year period in which these instruments have been operating, they have provided a very detailed and important long-term record of the global distribution of ozone.
Clouds and the Earth's Radiant Energy System (CERES)

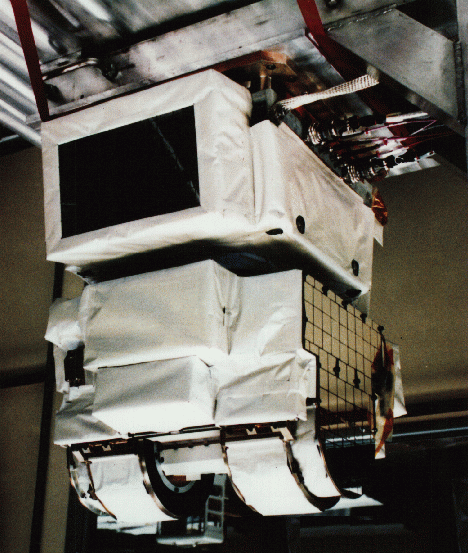
CERES instrument before installation

senses both solar-reflected and Earth-emitted radiation from the top of the atmosphere to the Earth's surface. Cloud properties are determined using simultaneous measurements by other JPSS instruments such as the VIIRS and will lead to a better understanding of the role of clouds and the energy cycle in global climate change.
Radiation Budget Instrument (RBI)
would measure reflected sunlight and thermal radiation emitted by the Earth. The measurements of the RBI, which was to be launched on JPSS-2 through JPSS-4, would have continued the record started with the Earth Radiation Budget Experiment and continued with the seven CERES instruments launched between 1998 and 2017.. The project was cancelled on January 26, 2018; NASA cited technical, cost, and schedule issues and the impact of anticipated RBI cost growth on other programs.
The Total Solar Irradiance (TSI) Calibration Transfer Experiment (TCTE)
The TCTE is an instrument that measures the sun's energy output. It was hosted aboard a U.S. Air Force Space Test Program Satellite-3 (STPSat-3) and launched on November 19, 2013, from NASA Wallops Flight Facility, Wallops Island, Va. JPSS was able to take advantage of this ride-share opportunity to provide a low-cost means of maintaining the continuity of TSI observations.
Libera
is a follow-on the CERES instruments and is named for Libera, the daughter of Ceres, the Roman goddess of agriculture. It will observe the Earth's radiation budget, analyzing solar radiation entering Earth's atmosphere and the amount that is either absorbed, reflected, or emitted. This is important for determining if the Earth is heating, cooling or balanced. Libera will help maintain the 40-year data record of the solar radiation balance.

== Operations ==
The ground communications and processing system for JPSS is known as the JPSS Common Ground System (JPSS CGS), and consists of a Command, Control, and Communications Segment (C3S) and the Interface Data Processing Segment (IDPS). Both are developed by Raytheon Intelligence and Information Systems (IIS). The IDPS will process JPSS satellite data to provide environmental data products (aka, Environmental Data Records or EDRs) to NOAA and DoD processing centers operated by the United States government. The IDPS has processed EDRs beginning with NPP and is slated to continue doing so through the lifetime of the JPSS and WSF-M systems.

The C3S is responsible for managing the overall JPSS (and potentially WSF-M) missions from control and status of the space and ground assets to ensuring delivery of timely, high-quality data from the Space Segments (SS) to IDPS for processing. In addition, the C3S provides the globally distributed ground assets necessary to collect and transport mission, telemetry, and command data between the satellites and the processing locations.

The JPSS Common Ground System (CGS) converges the NOAA-NASA civil polar environmental satellite program, NPOESS Preparatory Project (NPP), and the Air Force's Defense Weather Satellite System (DWSS) ground systems into a single, common system that will satisfy both U.S. and partner international environmental monitoring satellite needs from polar orbit.

== Satellites ==
There are two operating satellites, NOAA-20 and NOAA-21, that were designed as part of JPSS, but there are two other satellites that are associated with the program.

=== Suomi National Polar-orbiting Partnership ===
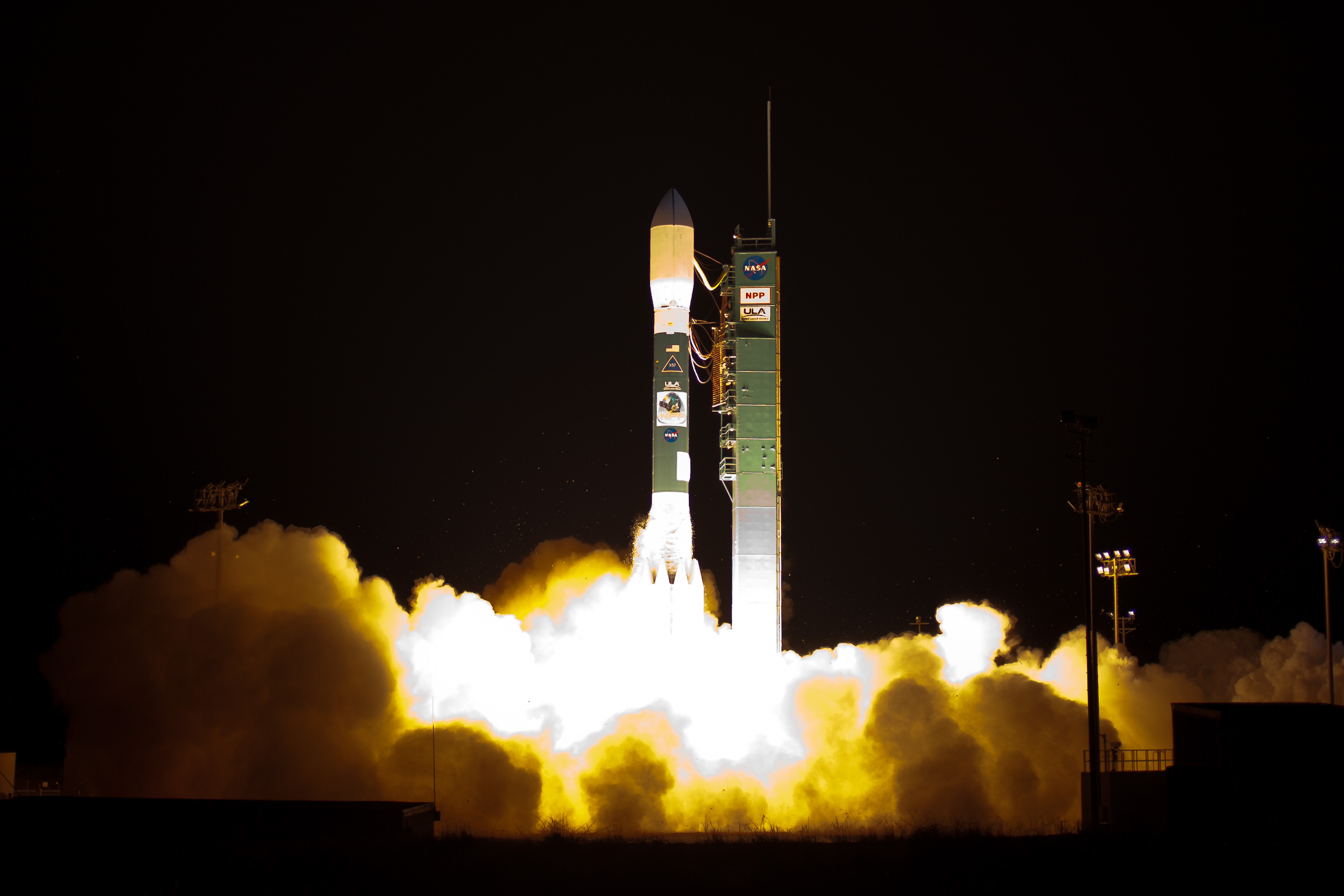
Launch of Suomi NPP

The Suomi National Polar-orbiting Partnership (Suomi NPP), previously known as the National Polar-orbiting Operational Environmental Satellite System (NPOESS) Preparatory Project (NPP) and NPP-Bridge, has a nearly identical design as NOAA-20 and shares some ground systems with it but it was not designed as a part of JPSS. It was originally proposed as a proof-of-concept satellite, and now supports NOAA and DoD operations. Suomi NPP was launched from Vandenberg Air Force Base in California on 28 October 2011 at 09:48 GMT. It is the first in-flight use of the JPSS ground system and key sensors which are on NOAA-20 and it served as both risk-reduction and as an early-flight opportunity for the JPSS program.

=== Total Solar Irradiance Calibration Transfer Experiment ===
In addition, the Total Solar Irradiance (TSI) Calibration Transfer Experiment, which was launched on the U.S. Air Force Space Test Program Satellite-3 (STPSat-3) on November 19, 2013, is an experimental payload under the JPSS system. It is an instrument that measures the sun's energy output and was launched as a rideshare opportunity as a way of maintaining the continuity of TSI observations.

=== JPSS-1 / NOAA-20 ===
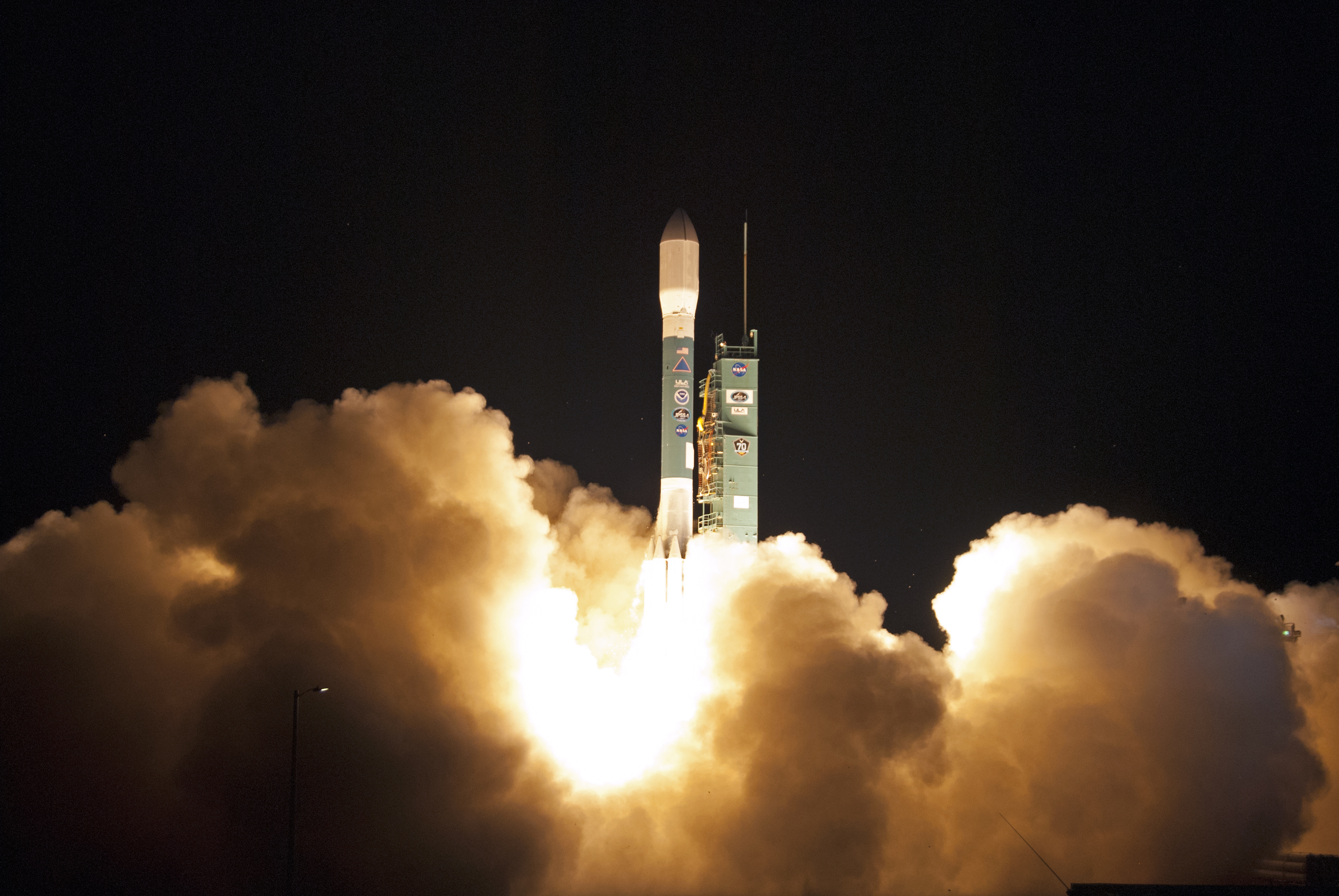
Launch of JPSS-1

NOAA-20 (JPSS-1) launched on November 18, 2017. NOAA-20 hosts the following instruments: (1) VIIRS, (2) CrIS, (3) ATMS, (4) OMPS-N, and (5) CERES.

=== JPSS-2 / NOAA-21 ===
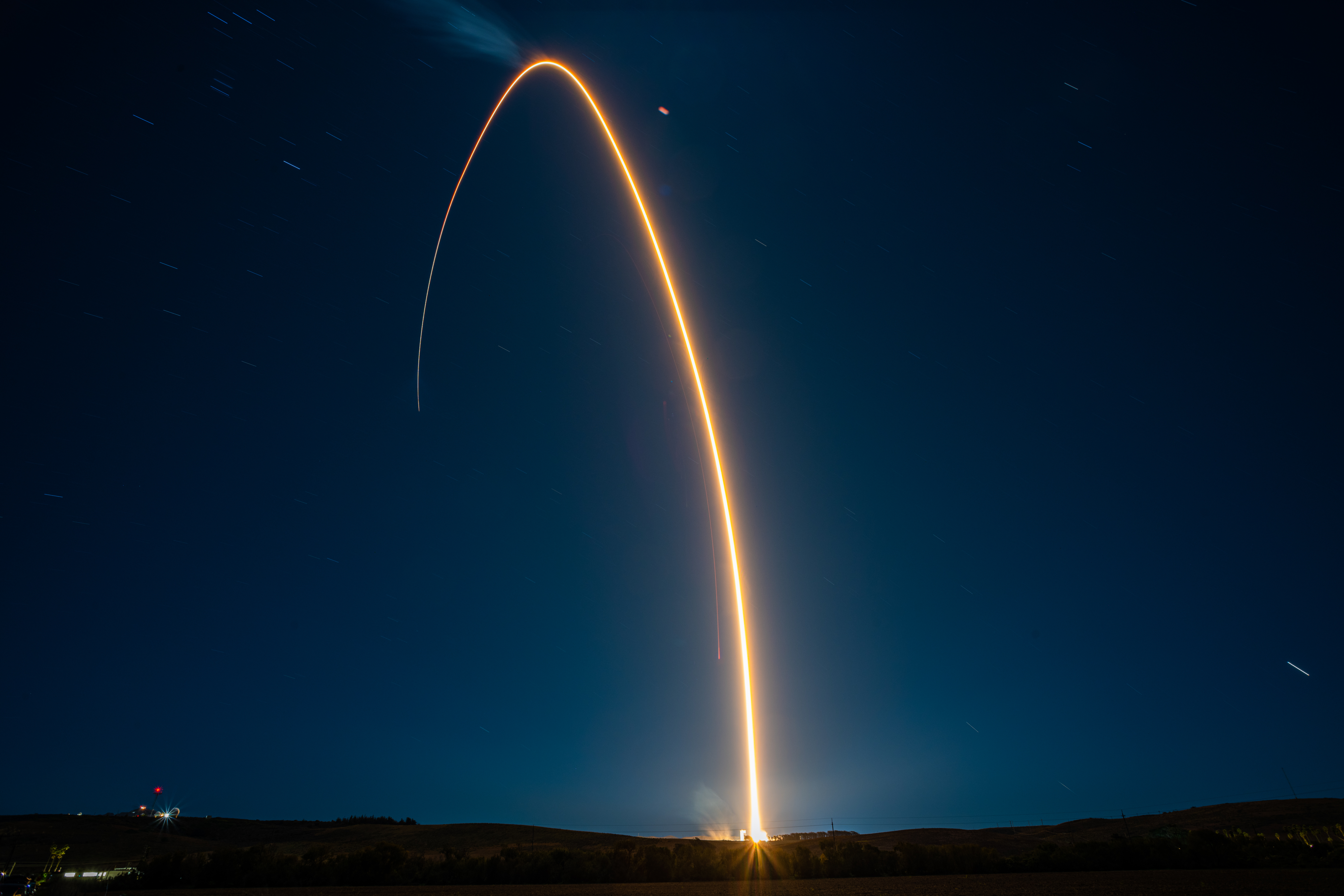
Launch of JPSS-2

NOAA-21 (JPSS-2) launched on November 10, 2022. NOAA-21 hosts the following instruments: (1) VIIRS, (2) CrIS, (3) ATMS, and (4) OMPS-N.

=== JPSS-4 ===
JPSS-4 is scheduled to launch in 2027. JPSS-4 will carry updated versions of: (1) VIIRS, (2) CrIS, (3) ATMS, (4) OMPS-N and (5)Libera.

=== JPSS-3 ===
JPSS-3 is scheduled to launch in 2032. Like JPSS-4, JPSS-3 will carry updated versions of: (1) VIIRS, (2) CrIS, (3) ATMS, and (4) OMPS-N

== Major contractors ==
=== Ball Aerospace ===
Ball Aerospace & Technologies Corp. (BATC) of Boulder, CO is the spacecraft contractor for both the JPSS-1 satellite and the Ozone instrument (OMPS) on the JPSS program and NPP.

=== Northrop Grumman ===
Northrop Grumman Innovation Systems of Dulles, VA, was selected to build the JPSS-2, JPSS-3, and JPSS-4 spacecraft.

Northrop Grumman Aerospace Systems (NGAS), of Azusa, CA is the developer and builder for the Advanced Technology Microwave Sounder (ATMS), a legacy instrument previously flown on the NPP mission.

Northrop Grumman Aerospace Systems (NGAS) of Redondo Beach, CA is the developer and builder for the Clouds and Earth's Radiant Energy System (CERES), a legacy instrument previously flown on the NASA Earth Observation System (EOS) satellites.

=== Raytheon Company ===
Raytheon Intelligence and Information Systems (IIS) of Aurora, CO is the prime contractor for the JPSS Common Ground System (CGS), whose major components necessary for operation of the NPP spacecraft have been delivered. Interface Data Processing Systems (IDPS) have been installed at two U.S. government processing facilities, known as weather centrals.

Raytheon Space and Airborne Systems (SAS) of El Segundo, CA is the developer and builder for the Visible Infrared Imaging Radiometer Suite (VIIRS).

=== L3Harris ===
L3Harris Technologies Fort Wayne, Indiana division, is the developer and builder for the Cross-track Infrared Sounder (CrIS) instrument planned for flight on the first and second Joint Polar Satellite System (JPSS-1 and JPSS-2).
