= NOAA-11 =

American weather satellite (1988-2004)

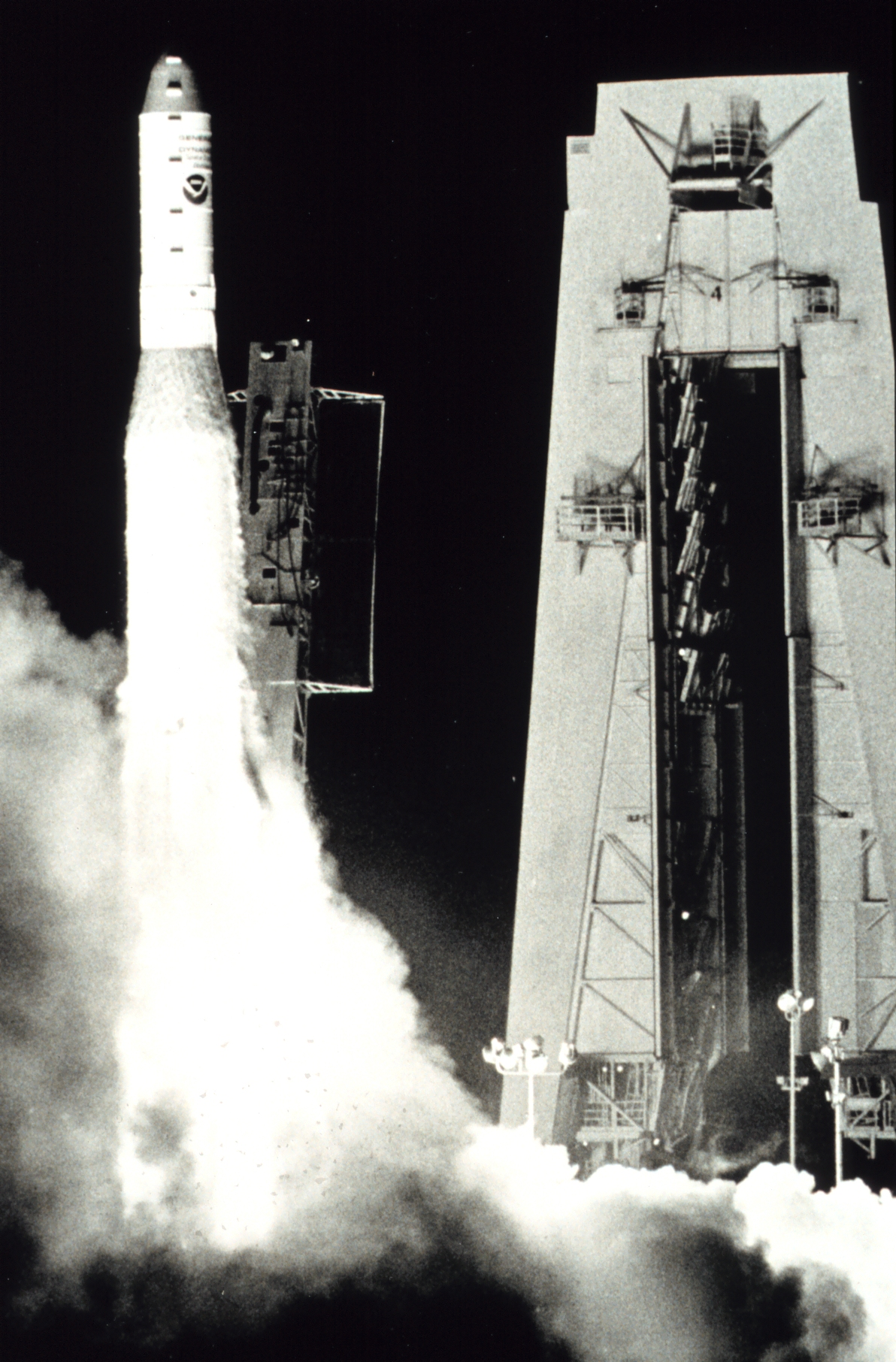
- Launch of NOAA-11
- Names: NOAA-H
- Mission type: Weather
- Operator: NOAA
- COSPAR ID: 1988-089A
- SATCAT no.: 19531
- Mission duration: 2 years (planned); 15.75 years (achieved)

Spacecraft properties
- Spacecraft type: TIROS
- Bus: Advanced TIROS-N
- Manufacturer: GE Aerospace
- Launch mass: 1,420 kg (3,130 lb)
- Dry mass: 740 kg (1,630 lb)

Start of mission
- Launch date: 24 September 1988, 10:02:00 UTC
- Rocket: Atlas-E Star-37S-ISS (Atlas S/N 63E)
- Launch site: Vandenberg, SLC-3W
- Contractor: Convair

End of mission
- Disposal: Decommissioned
- Last contact: 16 June 2004

Orbital parameters
- Reference system: Geocentric orbit
- Regime: Sun-synchronous orbit
- Perigee altitude: 833 km (518 mi)
- Apogee altitude: 870 km (540 mi)
- Inclination: 98.995°
- Period: 101.50 minutes
Instruments
- AVHRR/2: Advanced Very High Resolution Radiometer
- TOVS: TIROS Operational Vertical Sounder
- SEM: Space Environment Monitor
- DCS (Argos): Data Collection System
- SARSAT: Search and Rescue Satellite-Aided Tracking System
- ERBE: Earth Radiation Budget Experiment
- SBUV/2: Solar Backscatter Ultraviolet

NOAA-11, known as NOAA-H before launch, was an American weather satellite operated by the National Oceanic and Atmospheric Administration (NOAA) for use in the National Operational Environmental Satellite System (NOESS) and for support of the Global Atmospheric Research Program (GARP) during 1978–1984. It was the fourth of the Advanced TIROS-N series of satellites. The satellite design provided an economical and stable Sun-synchronous platform for advanced operational instruments to measure the atmosphere of Earth, its surface and cloud cover, and the near-space environment.

== Launch ==
NOAA-11 was launched on an Atlas E launch vehicle on 24 September 1988 at 10:02 UTC from Vandenberg Air Force Base at Vandenberg Space Launch Complex 3 (SLW-3W), California, United States.

== Spacecraft ==
The NOAA-11 satellite had a mass of 1,420 kg (3,130 lb). The satellite was based upon the DMSP Block 5D satellite bus developed for the U.S. Air Force, and it was capable of maintaining an Earth-pointing accuracy of better than ± 0.1° with a motion rate of less than 0.035 degrees/second.

== Instruments ==
Primary sensors included: 1) an Advanced very-high-resolution radiometer (AVHRR/2) for global cloud cover observations, 2) a TIROS Operational Vertical Sounder (TOVS) suite for atmospheric temperature and water profiling. The TOVS suite consists of three subsystems: the High Resolution Infrared Radiation Sounder 2 (HIRS/2), the Stratospheric Sounding Unit (SSU), and the Microwave Sounding Unit (MSU). 3) an Earth radiation budget experiment (ERBE), and 4) a Solar Backscattered UltraViolet radiometer (SBUV/2). The secondary experiment was a Data Collection System (DCS). A Search and Rescue Satellite-Aided Tracking System (SARSAT) system was also carried on NOAA-11. A Space Environment Monitor (SEM) measuring proton and electron fluxes.

=== Advanced Very High Resolution Radiometer (AVHRR/2) ===
The AVHRR/2 was a four-channel scanning radiometer capable of providing global daytime and nighttime sea-surface temperature and information about ice, snow, and clouds. These data were obtained on a daily basis for use in weather analysis and forecasting. The multispectral radiometer operated in the scanning mode and measured emitted and reflected radiation in the following spectral intervals: channel 1 (visible), 0.55 to 0.90 micrometer (μm); channel 2 (near infrared), 0.725 μm to detector cutoff around 1.1 μm; channel 3 (IR window), 3.55 to 3.93 μm; and channel 4 (IR window), 10.5 to 11.5 μm. All four channels had a spatial resolution of 1.1 km, and the two IR-window channels had a thermal resolution of 0.12 Kelvin at 300 Kelvin. The AVHRR was capable of operating in both real-time or recorded modes. Real-time or direct readout data were transmitted to ground stations both at low (4 km) resolution via automatic picture transmission (APT) and at high (1 km) resolution via high-resolution picture transmission (HRPT). Data recorded on board were available for processing in the NOAA central computer facility. They included global area coverage (GAC) data, with a resolution of 4 km, and local area coverage (LAC), that contained data from selected portions of each orbit with a 1-km resolution. Identical experiments were flown on other spacecraft in the TIROS-N/NOAA series.

=== TIROS Operational Vertical Sounder (TOVS) ===
The TOVS instrument suite consisted of three instruments: the High-resolution Infrared Radiation Sounder modification 2 (HIRS/2), the Stratospheric Sounding Unit (SSU), and the Microwave Sounding Unit (MSU). All three instruments were designed to determine radiances needed to calculate temperature and humidity profiles of the atmosphere from the surface to the stratosphere (approximately 1 mb). The HIRS/2 instrument had 20 channels in the following spectral intervals: channels 1 through 5, the 15-micrometer (μm) CO_{2} bands (15.0, 14.7, 14.5, 14.2, and 14.0 μm); channels 6 and 7, the 13.7- and 13.4-μm CO_{2}/H_{2}O bands; channel 8, the 11.1-μm window region; channel 9, the 9.7-μm ozone band; channels 10, 11, and 12, the 6-μm water vapor bands (8.3, 7.3, and 6.7 μm); channels 13 and 14, the 4.57-μm and 4.52-μm N_{2}O bands; channels 15 and 16, the 4.46-μm and 4.40-μm CO_{2}/N_{2}O bands; channel 17, the 4.24-μm CO_{2} band; channels 18 and 19, the 4.0-μm and 3.7-μm window bands; and channel 20, the 0.70-μm visible region. For NOAA-I AND NOAA-J, channel 10 and 17 operate at 12.25 and 4.13 μm, respectively. Resolution for all channels is 17.4 km at nadir. The HIRS/2 instrument provides data for calculations of temperature profiles from the surface to 10 mb, water vapor content at three levels of the atmosphere, and total ozone content. The second instrument, the SSU, is provided by United Kingdom. It has three channels that operate at 15.0 μm with three pressure-modulated cells containing CO_{2} to accomplish selective bandpass filtration of the sampled radiance. The third instrument, the MSU, has four channels operating in the 50- to 60-GHz oxygen band (50.31, 53.73, 54.96 and 57.95 GHz) to obtain temperature profiles which are free of cloud interference. The same experiments are flown on other spacecraft in the TIROS-N/NOAA series.

=== Data Collection System (DCS-Argos) ===
The Data Collection System (DCS) on NOAA-11, also known as Argos, was designed and built in France, is designed to meet the meteorological data needs of the United States and to support the Global Atmospheric Research Program (GARP). The system receives low-duty-cycle transmissions of meteorological observations from free-floating balloons, ocean buoys, other satellites, and fixed ground-based sensor platforms distributed around the globe. These observations are organized on board the spacecraft and retransmitted when the spacecraft comes within range of a Command and Data Acquisition (CDA) station. For free-moving balloons, the Doppler frequency shift of the transmitted signal is observed to calculate the location of the balloons. The DCS is expected, for a moving sensor platform, to have a location accuracy of 5 to 8 km, and a velocity accuracy of 1.0 to 1.6 m/s. This system has the capability of acquiring data from up to 2000 platforms per day. Identical experiments are flown on other spacecraft in the TIROS-N/NOAA series. Processing and dissemination of data were handled by CNES in Toulouse, France.

=== Search and Rescue Satellite Aided Tracking (SARSAT) ===
The Search and Rescue Satellite Aided Tracking (SARSAT) instruments had the capability of detecting and locating existing emergency transmitters in a manner independent of the environmental data. Data from the 121.5-MHz Emergency Locator Transmitters (ELT), the 243-MHz Emergency Position Indicating Radio Beacons (EPIRB), and experimental 406-MHz ELTs/EPIRBs were received by the Search and Rescue Repeater (SARR) and broadcast in real time on an L-band frequency (1544.5 MHz). Real-time data were monitored by local user terminals operated in the United States, Canada, and France. The 406-MHz data were also processed by the Search and Rescue Processor (SARP) and retransmitted in real time and stored on the spacecraft for later transmittal to the CDA stations in Alaska and Virginia, thus providing full global coverage. The distress signals were forwarded to Mission Control Centers located in each country for subsequent relay to the appropriate Rescue Coordination Center.

=== Solar Backscatter Ultraviolet Radiometer (SBUV/2) ===
The SBUV/2 was designed to map total ozone concentrations on a global scale, and to provide the vertical distribution of ozone in the atmosphere of Earth. The instrument design was based upon the technology developed for the SBUV/TOMS flown on Nimbus 7. The SBUV/2 instrument measured backscattered solar radiation in an 11.3° field of view in the nadir direction at 12 discrete, 1.1-nm wide, wavelength bands between 252.0 and 339.8 nm. The solar irradiance was determined at the same 12 wavelength bands by deploying a diffuser which reflected sunlight into the instrument's field of view. The SBUV/2 also measured the solar irradiance or the atmospheric radiance with a continuous spectral scan from 160 to 400 nm in increments of 0.148 nm. The SBUV/2 had another narrowband filter photometer channel, called the Cloud Cover Radiometer (CCR), which continuously measured the surface of Earth brightness at 380 nm. The CCR field of view was 11.3°.

=== Space Environment Monitor (SEM) ===
The SEM was an extension of the solar proton monitoring experiment flown on the ITOS spacecraft series. The object was to measure proton flux, electron flux density, and energy spectrum in the upper atmosphere. The experiment package consisted of three detector systems and a data processing unit. The Medium Energy Proton and Electron Detector (MEPED) measured protons in five energy ranges from 30 keV to >2.5 MeV; electrons above 30, 100, and 300 keV; protons and electrons (inseparable) above 6 MeV; and omni-directional protons above 16, 36, and 80 MeV. The High-Energy Proton Alpha Telescope (HEPAT), which had a 48° viewing cone, viewed in the anti-Earth direction and measured protons in four energy ranges above 370 MeV and alpha particles in two energy ranges above 850 MeV/nucleon. The Total Energy Detector (TED) measured electrons and protons between 300 eV and 20 keV.

== Science objectives ==
- Day and night observation of global cloud cover.
- Observation of atmospheric water/temperature profile.
- Monitoring particle flux in the near-Earth environment.

== Mission ==
The last contact occurred on 16 June 2004.
