= NOAA-20 =

American weather satellite

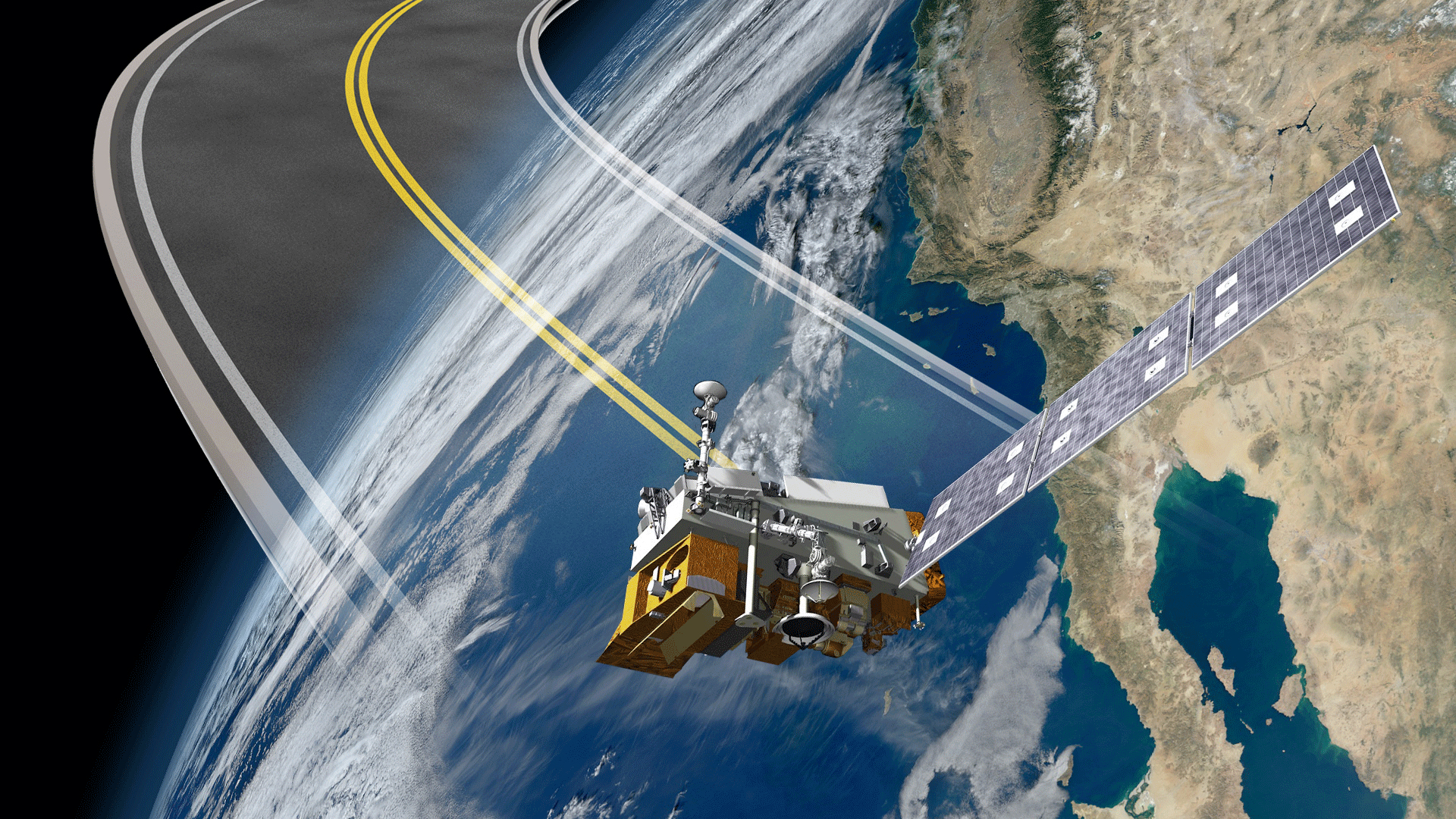
- Artist illustration of the NOAA-20 satellite
- Names: JPSS-1
- Mission type: Weather
- Operator: NOAA
- COSPAR ID: 2017-073A
- SATCAT no.: 43013
- Website: http://www.jpss.noaa.gov/
- Mission duration: 7 years (planned); 9 years, 1 day (elapsed)

Spacecraft properties
- Spacecraft type: Joint Polar Satellite System-1
- Bus: BCP-2000
- Manufacturer: Ball Aerospace & Technologies
- Launch mass: 2540 kg
- Dry mass: 1929 kg
- Payload mass: 578 kg
- Dimensions: 1.3 m x 1.3 m x 4.2 m
- Power: 1932 watts

Start of mission
- Launch date: 18 November 2017, 09:47:36 UTC
- Rocket: Delta II 7920-10C; D-378
- Launch site: Vandenberg, SLC-2W
- Contractor: United Launch Alliance
- Entered service: 30 May 2018

Orbital parameters
- Reference system: Geocentric orbit
- Regime: Sun-synchronous orbit
- Perigee altitude: 824.3 km (512.2 mi)
- Apogee altitude: 833.0 km (517.6 mi)
- Inclination: 98.79°
- Period: 101.44 minutes
Instruments
- CERES: Clouds and the Earth's Radiant Energy System
- CrIS: Cross-track Infrared Sounder
- OMPS: Ozone Mapping and Profiler Suite
- ATMS: Advanced Technology Microwave Sounder
- VIIRS: Visible Infrared Imaging Radiometer Suite
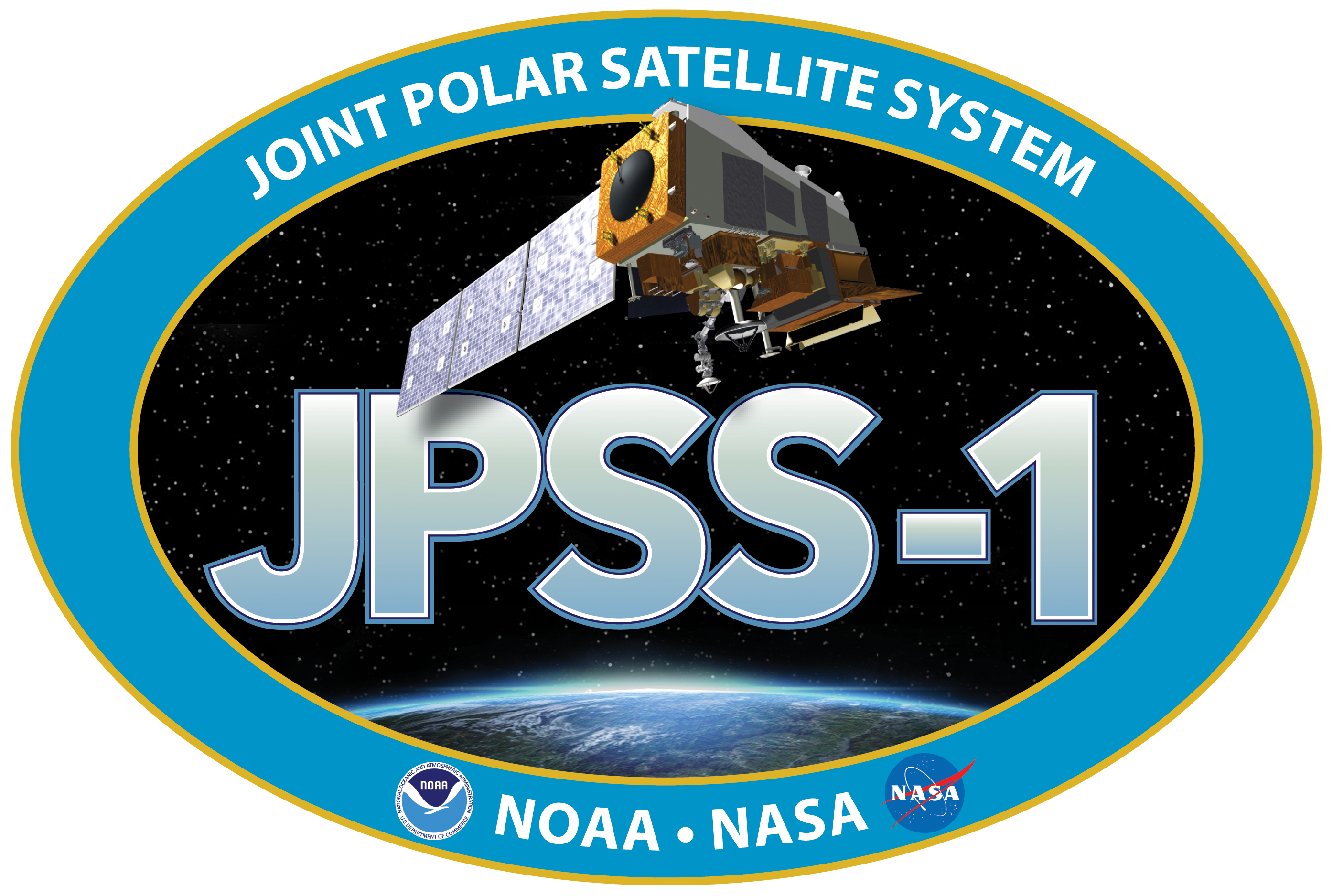
- JPSS-1 Mission Insignia Large Strategic Science Missions; Earth Science Division Joint Polar Satellite System

This visualization illustrates how JPSS-1 (now NOAA-20) orbit phasing and raising worked relative to Suomi NPP, the notional way it was maneuvered into a quarter-orbit along-track separation from NOAA-20 prior to launch of NOAA-21 (JPSS-2), and how a three-satellite constellation operated on a Sun-synchronous orbit node-crossing including sensor-swath footprints as the world turns below.

NOAA-20, designated JPSS-1 prior to launch, is the first of the United States National Oceanic and Atmospheric Administration's latest generation of U.S. polar-orbiting, non-geosynchronous, environmental satellites called the Joint Polar Satellite System. NOAA-20 was launched on November 18, 2017 and joined the Suomi National Polar-orbiting Partnership satellite in the same orbit. NOAA-20 operated about 50 minutes behind Suomi NPP, until NPP was deorbited in 2026, allowing important overlap in observational coverage. Circling the Earth from pole-to-pole, it crosses the equator about 14 times daily, providing full global coverage twice a day. This gives meteorologists information on "atmospheric temperature and moisture, clouds, sea-surface temperature, ocean color, sea ice cover, volcanic ash, and fire detection" so as to enhance weather forecasting including hurricane tracking, post-hurricane recovery by detailing storm damage and mapping of power outages.

The project incorporates five instruments, and these are substantially upgraded since previous satellite equipment. The project's greater-detailed observations provide better predictions and emphasize climate behavior in cases like El Niño and La Niña.

The satellite bus of the project and Ozone Mapping and Profiler Suite (OMPS) equipment, was designed by Ball Aerospace & Technologies. The Visible Infrared Imaging Radiometer Suite (VIIRS) and the Common Ground System (CGS) were built by Raytheon Company, and the Cross-track Infrared Sounder (CrIS) was by Harris Corporation. The Advanced Technology Microwave Sounder (ATMS) and the Clouds and the Earth's Radiant Energy System (CERES) instrument were built by Northrop Grumman Innovation Systems.

== Launch ==
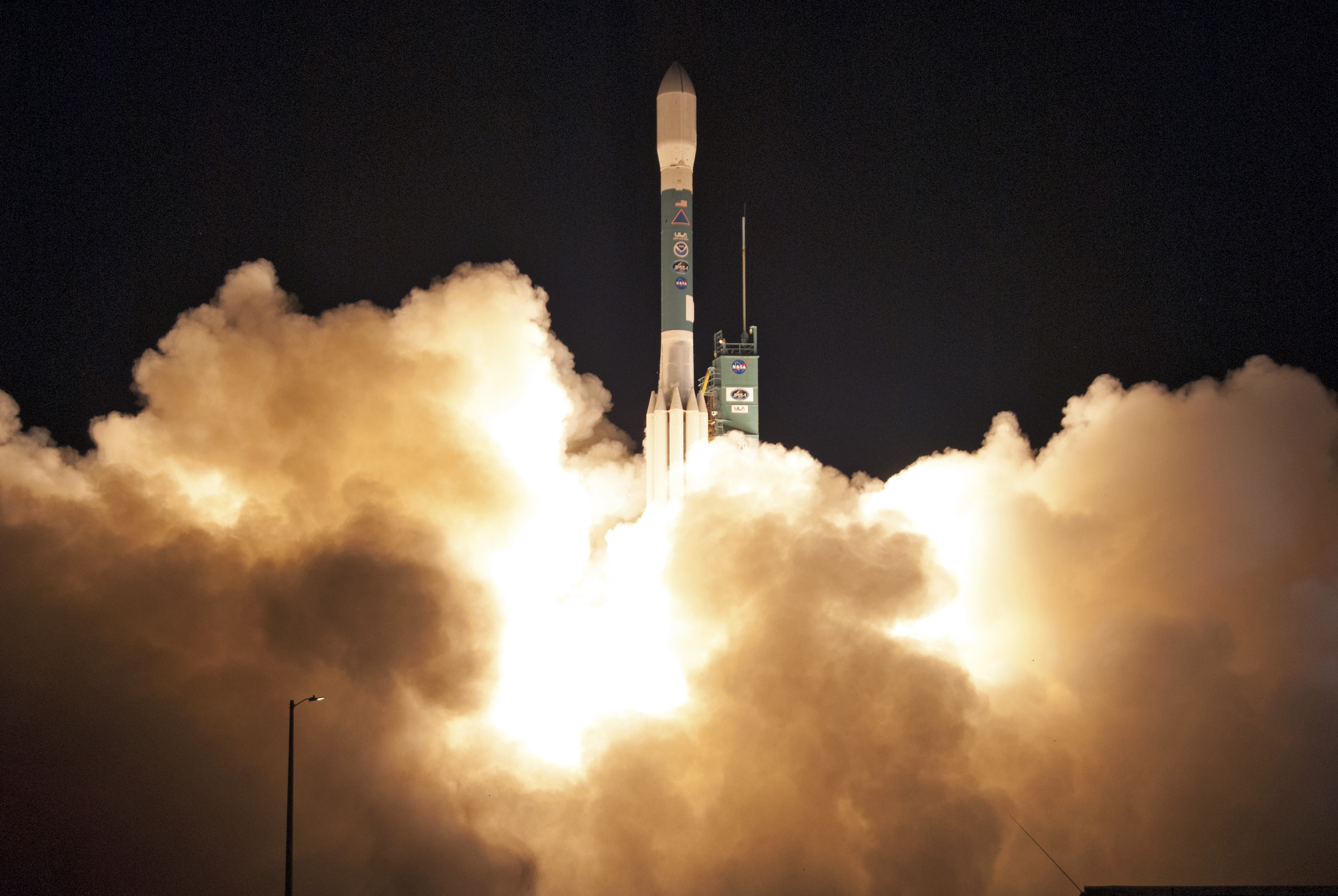
Launch of NOAA-20

The NOAA-20 launch was delayed several times. When the contract was awarded in 2010, launch was scheduled for 2014. By 2011, launch had slipped to 2016, and by 2012 that had slipped to 2017. In August 2016, following environmental testing, launch slipped from 20 January 2017 to 16 March 2017 due to problems with ATMS and the ground system. In January 2017, launch was delayed from March 2017 to the fourth quarter of fiscal year 2017, or July to September 2017 for the same reasons. The launch was delayed from September 2017 to November 10, 2017 to provide extra time for engineers to complete testing of the spacecraft and electronics as well as ATMS.

It also experienced several brief launch delays in the final weeks before launch. Originally scheduled to launch on November 10, 2017, it was delayed to November 14, 2017 following the discovery of a faulty battery on the Delta II launch vehicle. The launch was then delayed to November 15, 2017 due to boats being in the launch safety zone minutes before the launch and due to a bad reading on the first stage of the launch vehicle. It was delayed a third time to November 18, 2017 due to high winds.

NOAA-20 successfully launched on November 18, 2017 at 09:47:36 UTC. It represented the penultimate, and 99th consecutive successful launch of the Delta II launch vehicle. It was launched along with 5 CubeSats that conducted research in "3D-printed polymers for in-space manufacturing, weather data collection, bit flip memory testing, radar calibration and the effects of space radiation on electronic components".

== CubeSats ==
2017-073B | Buccaneer-RMM | Buccaneer-RMM | S43014
2017-073C | MiRaTA | MiRaTA | S43015
2017-073D | MakerSat-0 | MakerSat-0 | S43016
2017-073E | RadFxSat | Fox-1B | S43017
2017-073F | EagleSat | EagleSat | S43018

== Instruments ==
NOAA-20 sensors/instruments are:

=== Visible Infrared Imaging Radiometer Suite (VIIRS) ===
The Visible Infrared Imaging Radiometer Suite (VIIRS) takes global visible and infrared observations of land, ocean, and atmosphere parameters at high temporal resolution. Developed from the Moderate Resolution Imaging Spectroradiometer (MODIS) instrument flown on the Aqua and Terra Earth Observing System (EOS) satellites, it has significantly better performance than the Advanced very-high-resolution radiometer (AVHRR) previously flown on NOAA satellites.

=== Cross-track Infrared Sounder (CrIS) ===
The Cross-track Infrared Sounder (CrIS) produces high-resolution, three-dimensional temperature, pressure, and moisture profiles. These profiles are used to enhance weather forecasting models, and facilitate both short- and long-term weather forecasting. Over longer timescales, they help improve understanding of climate phenomena such as El Niño and La Niña. This is a new instrument. CrIS represents a significant enhancement over NOAA's legacy infrared sounder — High Resolution Infrared Radiation Sounders (HIRS) and is meant to be a counterpart to the Infrared Atmospheric Sounding Interferometer (IASI).

=== Advanced Technology Microwave Sounder (ATMS) ===
The Advanced Technology Microwave Sounder (ATMS) is a cross-track scanner with 22 channels, provides sounding observations needed to retrieve atmospheric temperature and moisture profiles for civilian operational weather forecasting as well as continuity of these measurements for climate monitoring purposes. It is a lighter-weight version of the previous Advanced Microwave Sounding Unit (AMSU) and Microwave Humidity Sounder (MHS) instruments flown on previous NOAA and NASA satellites with no new performance capabilities.

=== Ozone Mapping and Profiler Suite (OMPS) ===
The Ozone Mapping and Profiler Suite (OMPS) is an advanced suite of three hyperspectral instruments, extends the 25-plus year total-ozone and ozone-profile records. These records are used by ozone-assessment researchers and policy makers to track the health of the ozone layer. The improved vertical resolution of OMPS data products allows for better testing and monitoring of the complex chemistry involved in ozone destruction near the troposphere. OMPS products, when combined with cloud predictions, also help produce better ultraviolet index forecasts. OMPS carries on a long tradition of space borne measurements of ozone beginning in 1970 with the Nimbus 4 satellite and continuing with the Solar Backscatter Ultraviolet (SBUV and SBUV/2), Total Ozone Mapping Spectrometer (TOMS) and Ozone Monitoring Instrument (OMI) instruments on various NASA, NOAA, and international satellites. Over the more than 30-year period in which these instruments have been operating, they have provided a very detailed and important long-term record of the global distribution of ozone.

=== Clouds and the Earth's Radiant Energy System (CERES) ===
The Clouds and the Earth's Radiant Energy System (CERES), senses both solar-reflected and Earth-emitted radiation from the top of the atmosphere to the surface of Earth. Cloud properties are determined using simultaneous measurements by other JPSS instruments such as the VIIRS and will lead to a better understanding of the role of clouds and the energy cycle in global climate change.

== Mission ==
Between 29 November 2017, when ATMS produced its "first light" image, and 5 January 2018, when Visible Infrared Imaging Radiometer Suite (VIIRS) and Ozone Mapping and Profiler Suite (OMPS) produced theirs, the satellite went through activation, outgassing and decontamination on the path to operation.

On 30 May 2018, after six months of on-orbit checkout, NOAA declared the spacecraft fully operational and the primary polar-orbiting satellite.

Following the launch of NOAA-21, it became the backup.

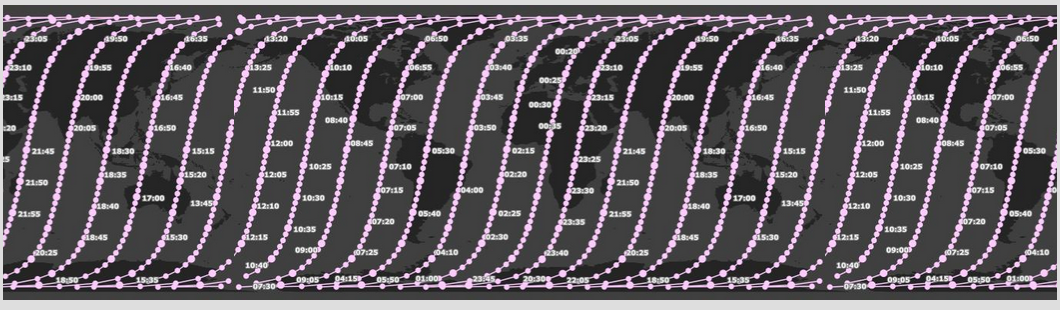
NOAA-20's descending orbital path
