= SBUV/2 =

Sun-synchronous Ozone-monitoring satellite sensors

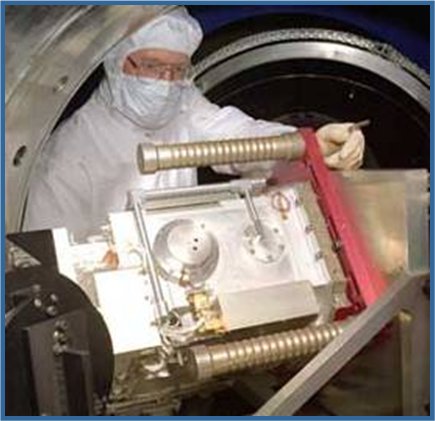
Technician preparing the SBUV/2 instrument for calibration in a vacuum chamber at Ball Aerospace in Boulder, CO.

The Solar Backscatter Ultraviolet Radiometer, or SBUV/2, is a series of operational remote sensors on NOAA weather satellites in Sun-synchronous orbits which have been providing global measurements of stratospheric total ozone, as well as ozone profiles, since March 1985. The SBUV/2 instruments were developed from the SBUV experiment flown on the Nimbus-7 spacecraft which improved on the design of the original BUV instrument on Nimbus-4. These are nadir viewing radiometric instruments operating at mid to near UV wavelengths. SBUV/2 data sets overlap with data from SBUV and TOMS instruments on the Nimbus-7 spacecraft. These extensive data sets (January 1979 to the present) measure the density and vertical distribution of ozone in the Earth's atmosphere from six to 30 miles.

SBUV/2 looks down at the Earth's atmosphere and the reflected sunlight at wavelengths characteristic of ozone. The SBUV/2 wavelength "channels" range from 252 nanometer (nm) to 340 nm. Ozone is measured as a ratio of sunlight incident on the atmosphere to the amount of sunlight scattered back into space. From this information, the total ozone between the instrument and the ground can be calculated.

The SBUV/2 measures solar irradiance and Earth radiance (backscattered solar energy) in the near ultraviolet spectrum (160 to 400 nm). The SBUV is capable of determining the global ozone concentration in the stratosphere to an absolute accuracy of 1 percent; the vertical distribution of atmospheric ozone to an absolute accuracy of 5 percent; the long-term solar spectral irradiance from 160 to 400 nm Photochemical process and the influence of “trace” constituents on the ozone layer.

The Ball Aerospace-built SBUV/2 helped to discover the ozone hole over Antarctica in 1987, and continues to monitor this phenomenon. Atmospheric ozone absorbs the sun's ultraviolet rays, which are believed to cause gene mutations, skin cancer, and cataracts in humans. Ultraviolet rays may also damage crops and aquatic ecosystems. The first SBUV/2 instrument was launched on NOAA-9 in December 1984 and the last instrument in this series was launched in February 2009 aboard the NOAA-19 spacecraft.

The Ozone Mapping and Profiler Suite on Suomi NPP and NOAA-20 is the follow-on to SBUV/2.

== See also ==
- Dobson ozone spectrophotometer
- Global Ozone Monitoring by Occultation of Stars (GOMOS)
- Global Ozone Monitoring Experiment-2 (GOME-2)
- Ozone Monitoring Instrument (OMI)
- SAGE III on ISS
- Scanning Imaging Absorption Spectrometer for Atmospheric Chartography (SCIAMACHY)
- Stratospheric Aerosol and Gas Experiment (SAGE)
- Total Ozone Mapping Spectrometer (TOMS)
