= Radiation Budget Instrument =

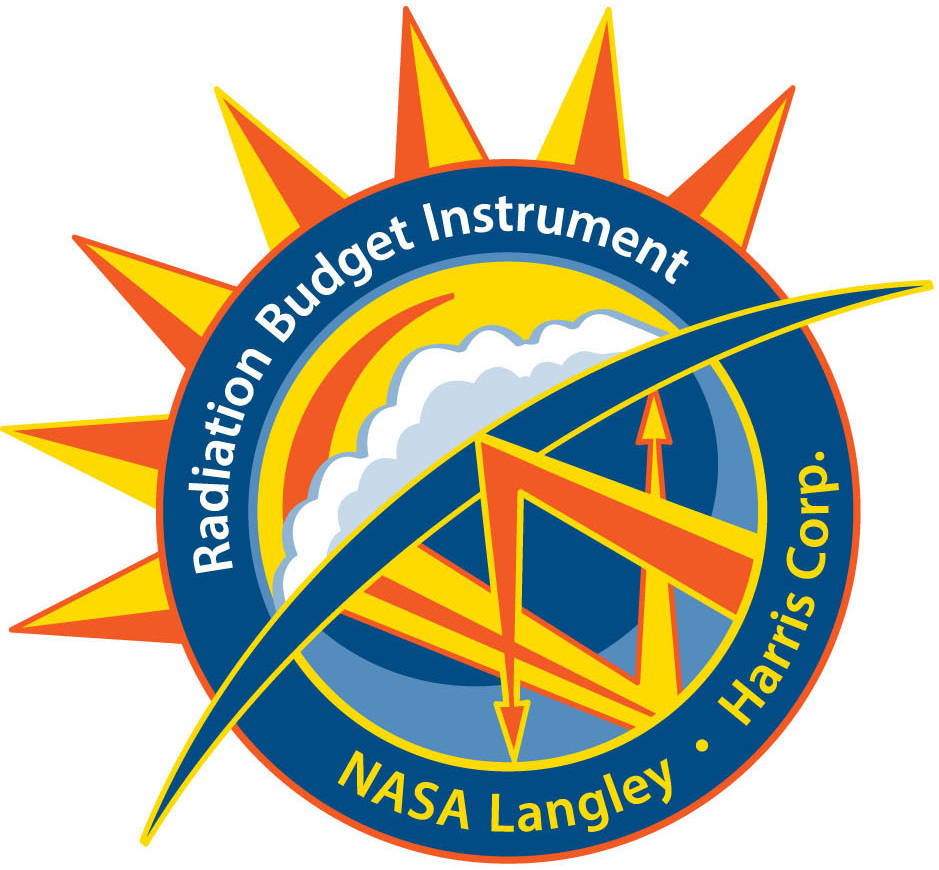

The Radiation Budget Instrument (RBI) is a satellite-based scanning radiometer capable of measuring Earth's reflected sunlight and emitted thermal radiation. The project was cancelled on January 26, 2018; NASA cited technical, cost, and schedule issues and the impact of anticipated RBI cost growth on other programs.

RBI was scheduled to fly on the Joint Polar Satellite System 2 (JPSS-2) mission planned for launch in November 2021; the JPSS-3 mission planned for launch in 2026; and the JPSS-4 mission planned for launch in 2031. The one on JPSS-2 would have been the 14th in the series that started with the Earth radiation budget instruments launched in 1985, and would have extended the unique global climate measurements of the Earth's radiation budget provided by the Clouds and the Earth's Radiant Energy System (CERES) instruments since 1998.
