= Visible Infrared Imaging Radiometer Suite =

Spacecraft instrument

Earth at night as imaged by VIIRS in 2016

The Visible Infrared Imaging Radiometer Suite (VIIRS) is a sensor designed and manufactured by the Raytheon Company on board the polar-orbiting Suomi National Polar-orbiting Partnership (Suomi NPP), NOAA-20, and NOAA-21 weather satellites. VIIRS is one of five key instruments onboard Suomi NPP, launched on October 28, 2011. VIIRS is a whiskbroom scanner radiometer that collects imagery and radiometric measurements of the land, atmosphere, cryosphere, and oceans in the visible and infrared bands of the electromagnetic spectrum.

VIIRS is capable of generating two data processing streams that result in two different sets of land products, with global coverage every 14 hours. One is produced by NOAA, and provides operational data for use by the National Weather Service. These are known as environmental data records (EDRs). The other stream is from NASA, and is intended to contribute to the larger scientific community. These are known as Earth System Data Records (ESDRs).

VIIRS's main uses include monitoring and investigating changes and properties in surface vegetation, land cover/use, the hydrologic cycle, and the Earth's energy budget over both regional and global scales. The combination of MODIS, AVHRR, and VIIRS data sets will allow for the assessment of how climate change has affected the Earth's surface over the past ~20 years.

== Mission overview ==
VIIRS was launched on board Suomi NPP by a United Launch Alliance Delta II rocket from the Vandenberg Air Force Base at 5:48 am EDT on 28 Oct, 2011. VIIRS was designed to expand upon the data collected by the aging MODIS and AVHRR sensors by collecting radiometric measurements of Earth in the visible and infrared spectra. This data is used to provide insight into the properties and dynamics of different geophysical phenomena, including: aerosol and cloud properties, sea, land and ice surface temperatures, ice motion, fires, and the albedo of Earth. VIIR's main objectives include the monitoring and investigation of changes and properties in vegetation, land cover/use, the hydrologic cycle, and the earth's energy budget over both global and regional scales. This information is useful in furthering our understanding of global climate change. The combination of MODIS, AVHRR, and VIIRS datasets will permit a comprehensive assessment of how climate change has effected the land surface over the past ~20 years.

== Specifications ==
VIIRS has a swath width of 3060 km at the satellite's average altitude of 829 km. This swath width is able to provide complete coverage of Earth across the day. The VIIRS instrument can collect data in 22 different spectral bands of the electromagnetic spectrum, in the wavelengths between 0.412 μm and 12.01 μm. The spatial resolution of the sensor depends on the band of the electromagnetic spectrum. Out of the 22 different spectral bands the sensor has, 16 are moderate resolution bands (M-bands) which have a spatial resolution of 750m at the Nadir. The other six bands are made up of five imaging resolution bands (I-bands), which have a spatial resolution of 375m at the nadir, and one day/night panchromatic band with a spatial resolution of 750m. VIIRS imaging optics include a 19.1 cm Aperture and a 114 cm Focal length. The average orbit power for the instrument is 200 watts. In total the instrument weighs 275 kg.

Band number	Spectral range (μm)	Primary uses
M1	0.402-0.422	Ocean Color Aerosols
M2	0.436-0.454	Ocean Color Aerosols
M3	0.478-0.498	Ocean Color Aerosols
M4	0.545-0.565	Ocean Color Aerosols
I1	0.600-0.680	Imagery
M5	0.662-0.682	Ocean Color Aerosols
M6	0.739-0.754	Atmospheric Correction
I2	0.846-0.885	NDVI
M7	0.846-0.885	Ocean Color Aerosols
M8	1.230-1.25	Cloud Particle Size
M9	1.371-1.386	Cirrus/Cloud Cover
I3	1.580-1.640	Binary Snow Map
M10	1.580-1.640	Snow Fraction
M11	2.225-2.275	Clouds
I4	3.550-3.930	Cloud Imagery
M12	3.660-3.840	Sea surface temperature (SST)
M13	3.973-4.128	SST Fires
M14	8.400-8.700	Cloud Top Properties
M15	10.263-11.263	SST
I5	10.500-12.400	Cloud Imagery
M16	11.538-12.488	SST
DNB	0.500-0.900	Light pollution

=== Spatial resolution ===
The VIIRS instrument provides 22 spectral bands at two native spatial resolutions, 375 meters (m) and 750 m, which are resampled to three nominal spatial resolutions 500 m, 1,000 m, and 5,600 m (0.05 degrees) in the NASA produced data products.
