= Ozone Mapping and Profiler Suite =

Instruments to measure ozone distribution

Ozone Mapping and Profiler Suite (OMPS), is a suite of instruments built by Ball Aerospace that measure the global distribution of ozone and, less frequently, how it is distributed vertically within the stratosphere. The suite flies on the Suomi NPP and NOAA-20 (formerly JPSS-1) satellites along with several other instruments. It had been intended to also fly on the NPOESS, for which the NPP was a preparatory project, but the dissolution of that project was announced in 2010. OMPS launched on October 28, 2011.

The three components of the suite are Nadir, which looks straight down, Limb, which looks down at an angle, and the Main Electronics Box (MEB), which controls Nadir, Limb and communication. Nadir and Limb are on the Suomi NPP, while the MEB is on NOAA-20. Nadir itself has two spectrometers: a profiler and a mapper. It is included on NOAA-21 (JPSS-2), which was launched on November 10, 2022.

OMPS weighs 56 kilograms and runs on an average power of 85 Watts.

== See also ==
- Polar Operational Environmental Satellites
- Total Ozone Mapping Spectrometer
- SBUV/2
