= Nimbus 7 =

Former U.S. meteorological satellite

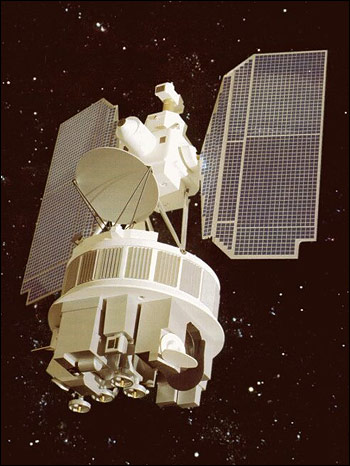
- Artist rendering of the Nimbus 7
- Mission type: Weather satellite
- Operator: NASA / NOAA
- COSPAR ID: 1978-098A
- SATCAT no.: 11080

Spacecraft properties
- Manufacturer: RCA Astrospace
- Launch mass: 965 kilograms (2,127 lb)
- Dry mass: 832 kilograms (1,834 lb)
- Dimensions: 3.04 m × 1.52 m × 3.96 m (10.0 ft × 5.0 ft × 13.0 ft)
- Power: 300 W

Start of mission
- Launch date: October 24, 1978 08:14:01 UTC
- Rocket: Delta-2910 630/D145
- Launch site: Vandenberg SLC-2W

End of mission
- Last contact: August 1, 1994

Orbital parameters
- Reference system: Geocentric
- Regime: Low Earth
- Eccentricity: 0.001
- Perigee altitude: 941 kilometers (585 mi)
- Apogee altitude: 954 kilometers (593 mi)
- Inclination: 99.15°
- Period: 104 minutes
- Epoch: 24 October 1978

Nimbus 7 (also called Nimbus G) was a meteorological satellite. It was the seventh and last in a series of the Nimbus program.

== Launch ==
Nimbus 7 was launched on October 24, 1978, by a Delta rocket from Vandenberg Air Force Base, California, United States. The spacecraft functioned nominally until 1994. The satellite orbited the Earth once every 1 hour and 34 minutes, at an inclination of 99 degrees. Its perigee was 941 kilometers (585 mi) and its apogee was 954 kilometers (593 mi).

== Mission ==
The Nimbus 7 research and development satellite served as a stabilized, Earth-oriented platform for the testing of advanced systems for sensing and collecting data in the pollution, oceanographic, and meteorological disciplines. The polar-orbiting spacecraft consisted of three major structures: a hollow torus-shaped sensor mount, solar paddles, and a control housing unit that was connected to the sensor mount by a tripod truss structure.

Configured somewhat like an ocean buoy, Nimbus 7 was nearly 3.04 metres (10.0 ft) tall, 1.52 metres (5.0 ft) in diameter at the base, and about 3.96 metres (13.0 ft) wide with solar paddles extended. The electronics equipment and battery modules were housed in the sensor mount (torus) that formed the satellite base. The lower surface of the torus provided mounting space for sensors and antennas. A box-beam structure mounted within the center of the torus provided support for the larger sensor experiments. Mounted on the control housing unit, which was located on top of the spacecraft, were Sun sensors, horizon scanners, and a command antenna. The spacecraft's spin axis was pointed at the Earth. An advanced attitude-control system permitted the spacecraft's orientation to be controlled to within plus or minus 1 degree in all three axes (pitch, roll, yaw).

== Instruments ==
Eight experiments were selected, using the following instruments:

- Coastal-Zone Color Scanner (CZCS)
- Earth Radiation Budget (ERB)
- Limb Infrared Monitoring of the Stratosphere (LIMS)
- Scanning Multichannel Microwave Radiometer (SMMR)
- Solar Backscatter UV and Total Ozone Mapping Spectrometer (SBUV/TOMS)
- Stratospheric Aerosol Measurement II (SAM II)
- Stratospheric and Mesospheric Sounder (SAMS)
- Temperature-Humidity Infrared Radiometer (THIR)

These sensors were capable of observing several parameters at and below the mesospheric levels.
