= Global Ozone Monitoring by Occultation of Stars =

Global Ozone Monitoring by Occultation of Stars (GOMOS), is an instrument on board the European satellite Envisat launched 1 March 2002. It is the first space instrument dedicated to the study of the atmosphere of the Earth by the technique of stellar occultation. The spectrum of stars in the ultraviolet, visible and the near infrared parts of the electromagnetic spectrum is observed. It is aimed to use GOMOS to build a climatology of ozone and related species in the middle atmosphere (15 to 100 km).

== Instrument details ==
The 250-680 nm spectral domain is used for the determination of O_{3}, NO_{2}, NO_{3}^{−}, aerosols and temperature. In addition, two high spectral resolution channels centred at 760 and 940 nm allow measurements of O_{2} and H_{2}O and two fast photometers are used to correct star scintillation perturbations and to determine high vertical resolution temperature profiles.

Global latitude coverage is obtained with up to 40 stellar occultations per orbit from South Pole to North Pole. Data acquired on dark limb (night-time) are of better quality than on bright limb (day-time) because of a smaller perturbation by background light.

== History ==
GOMOS was first proposed in 1988 as an Announcement of Opportunity instrument dedicated to be a part of the Earth Observation Polar Platform Mission, the former name of Envisat. In 1992 it was decided that GOMOS would be developed as a European Space Agency-funded instrument.
