= Advanced Very-High-Resolution Radiometer =

Space-borne earth reflectance sensor

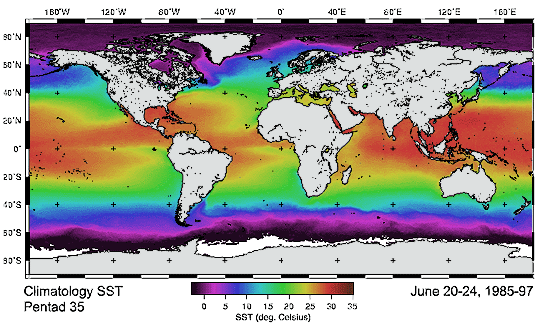
An image of global sea surface temperatures acquired from the NOAA/ AVHRR satellite

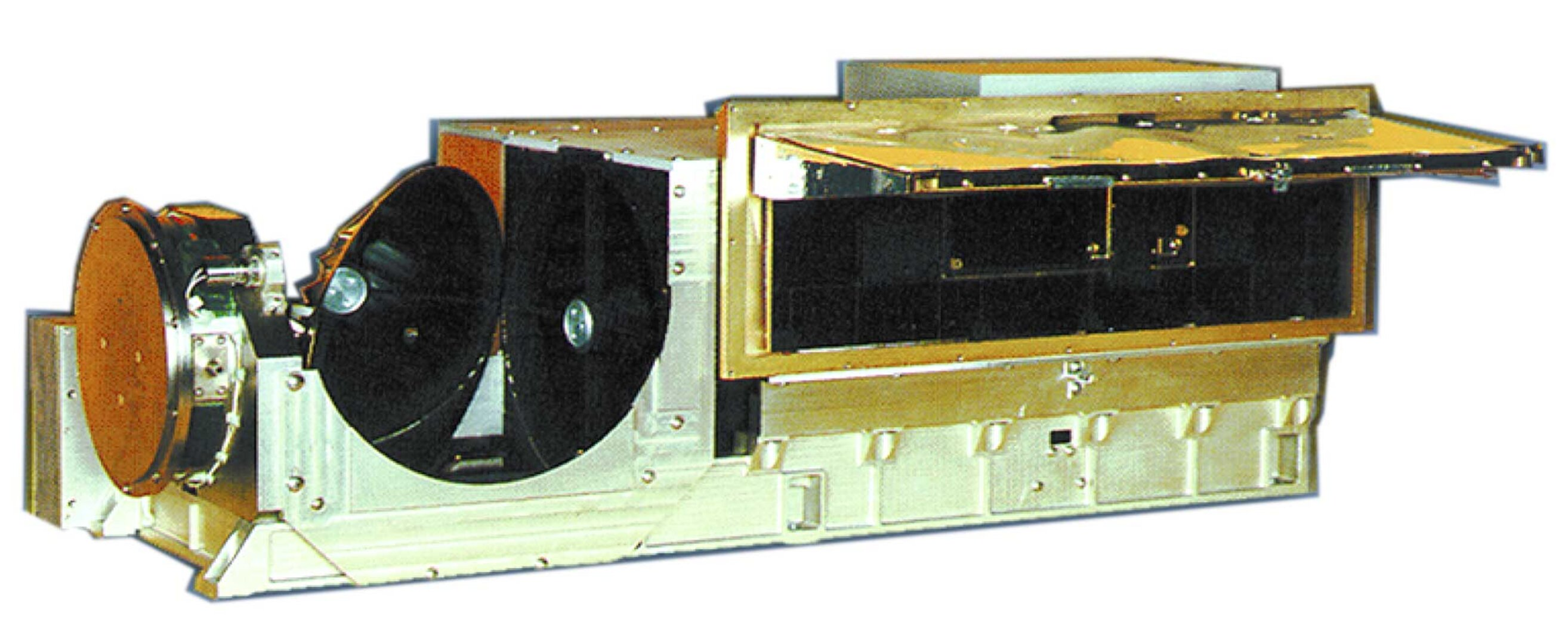
NOAA AVHRR/3 Instrument

The Advanced Very-High-Resolution Radiometer (AVHRR) instrument is a space-borne sensor that measures the reflectance of the Earth in five spectral bands that are relatively wide by today's standards. AVHRR instruments are or have been carried by the National Oceanic and Atmospheric Administration (NOAA) family of polar orbiting platforms (POES) and European MetOp satellites. The instrument scans several channels; two are centered on the red (0.6 micrometres) and near-infrared (0.9 micrometres) regions, a third one is located around 3.5 micrometres, and another two the thermal radiation emitted by the planet, around 11 and 12 micrometres.

The first AVHRR instrument was a four-channel radiometer. The final version, AVHRR/3, first carried on NOAA-15 launched in May 1998, acquires data in six channels. The AVHRR has been succeeded by the Visible Infrared Imaging Radiometer Suite, carried on the Joint Polar Satellite System spacecraft.

== Operation ==
Prior to 2025, NOAA had at least two polar-orbiting meteorological satellites in orbit at all times, with one satellite crossing the equator in the early morning and early evening and the other crossing the equator in the afternoon and late evening. The primary sensor on board both satellites was the AVHRR instrument. Morning-satellite data were most commonly used for land studies, while data from both satellites were used for atmosphere and ocean studies. Together they provided twice-daily global coverage, and ensured that data for any region of the earth are no more than six hours old. The swath width, the width of the area on the Earth's surface that the satellite can "see", is approximately 2,500 kilometers (~1,540 mi). The satellites orbit between 833 or 870 kilometers (+/− 19 kilometers, 516–541 miles) above the surface of the Earth.

The highest ground resolution that can be obtained from the current AVHRR instruments is 1.1-kilometer (0.68 mi) per pixel at the nadir.

Data from AVHRR (in its three evolutions) has been collected continuously since 1981.

The primary purpose of these instruments is to monitor clouds and to measure the thermal emission of the Earth. These sensors have proven useful for a number of other applications, however, including the surveillance of land surfaces, ocean state, aerosols, etc. AVHRR data are particularly relevant to study climate change and environmental degradation because of the comparatively long records of data already accumulated (over 20 years). The main difficulty associated with these investigations is to properly deal with the many limitations of these instruments, especially in the early period (sensor calibration, orbital drift, limited spectral and directional sampling, etc.). Whereas, the follow-on VIIRS instruments on JPSS and METimage in MetOp-SG satellites have on-board calibration mechanisms.

The AVHRR instrument also flies on the MetOp series of satellites and as of 2025 these are the only remaining AVHRR instruments. The Metop-B&C MetOp satellites are part of the EUMETSAT Polar System (EPS) run by EUMETSAT, which will be succeeded by MetOp-SG.

== Calibration and validation ==
Remote sensing applications of the AVHRR sensor are based on validation (matchup) techniques of co-located ground observations and satellite observations. Alternatively, radiative transfer calculations are performed. There are specialized codes which allow simulation of the AVHRR observable brightness temperatures and radiances in near infrared and infrared channels.

=== Pre-launch calibration of visible channels (Ch. 1 and 2) ===
Prior to launch, the visible channels (Ch. 1 and 2) of AVHRR sensors are calibrated by the instrument manufacturer, ITT, Aerospace/Communications Division, and are traceable to NIST standards. The calibration relationship between electronic digital count response (C) of the sensor and the albedo (A) of the calibration target are linearly regressed:

A = S * C + I

where S and I are the slope and intercept (respectively) of the calibration regression [NOAA KLM]. However, the highly accurate prelaunch calibration will degrade during launch and transit to orbit as well as during the operational life of the instrument [Molling et al., 2010]. Halthore et al. [2008] note that sensor degradation is mainly caused by thermal cycling, outgassing in the filters, damage from higher energy radiation (such as ultraviolet (UV)), and condensation of outgassed gases onto sensitive surfaces.

One major design constraint of AVHRR instruments is that they lack the capability to perform accurate, onboard calibrations once on orbit [NOAA KLM]. Thus, post-launch on-orbit calibration activities (known as vicarious calibration methods) must be performed to update and ensure the accuracy of retrieved radiances and the subsequent products derived from these values [Xiong et al., 2010]. Numerous studies have been performed to update the calibration coefficients and provide more accurate retrievals versus using the pre-launch calibration.

=== On-orbit individual/few sensor absolute calibration ===
==== Rao and Chen ====
Rao and Chen [1995] use the Libyan Desert as a radiometrically stable calibration target to derive relative annual degradation rates for Channels 1 and 2 for AVHRR sensors on board the NOAA -7, -9, and -11 satellites. Additionally, with an aircraft field campaign over the White Sands desert site in New Mexico, USA [See Smith et al., 1988], an absolute calibration for NOAA-9 was transferred from a well calibrated spectrometer on board a U-2 aircraft flying at an altitude of ~18 km in a congruent path with the NOAA-9 satellite above. After being corrected for the relative degradation, the absolute calibration of NOAA-9 is then passed onto NOAA −7 and −11 via a linear relationship using Libyan Desert observations that are restricted to similar viewing geometries as well as dates in the same calendar month [Rao and Chen, 1995], and any sensor degradation is corrected for by adjusting the slope (as a function of days after launch) between the albedo and digital count signal recorded [Rao and Chen, 1999].

==== Loeb ====
In another similar method using surface targets, Loeb [1997] uses spatiotemporal uniform ice surfaces in Greenland and Antarctica to produce second-order polynomial reflectance calibration curves as a function of solar zenith angle; calibrated NOAA-9 near-nadir reflectances are used to generate the curves that can then derive the calibrations for other AHVRRs in orbit (e.g. NOAA-11, -12, and -14).

It was found that the ratio of calibration coefficients derived by Loeb [1997] and Rao and Chen [1995] are independent of solar zenith angle, thus implying that the NOAA-9-derived calibration curves provide an accurate relation between the solar zenith angle and observed reflectance over Greenland and Antarctica.

==== Iwabuchi ====
Iwabuchi [2003] employed a method to calibrate NOAA-11 and -14 that uses clear-sky ocean and stratus cloud reflectance observations in a region of the NW Pacific Ocean and radiative transfer calculations of a theoretical molecular atmosphere to calibrate AVHRR Ch. 1. Using a month of clear-sky observations over the ocean, an initial minimum guess to the calibration slope is made. An iterative method is then used to achieve the optimal slope values for Ch. 1 with slope corrections adjusting for uncertainties in ocean reflectance, water vapor, ozone, and noise. Ch. 2 is then subsequently calibrated under the condition that the stratus cloud optical thickness in both channels must be the same (spectrally uniform in the visible) if their calibrations are correct [Iwabuchi, 2003].

==== Vermote and Saleous ====
A more contemporary calibration method for AVHRR uses the on-orbit calibration capabilities of the VIS/IR channels of MODIS. Vermote and Saleous [2006] present a methodology that uses MODIS to characterize the BRDF of an invariant desert site. Due to differences in the spectral bands used for the instruments' channels, spectral translation equations were derived to accurately transfer the calibration accounting for these differences. Finally, the ratio of AVHRR observed to that modeled from the MODIS observation is used to determine the sensor degradation and adjust the calibration accordingly.

==== Others ====
Methods for extending the calibration and record continuity also make use of similar calibration activities [Heidinger et al., 2010].

=== Long-term calibration and record continuity ===
In the discussion thus far, methods have been posed that can calibrate individual or are limited to a few AVHRR sensors. However, one major challenge from a climate point of view is the need for record continuity spanning 30+ years of three generations of AVHRR instruments as well as more contemporary sensors such as MODIS and VIIRS. Several artifacts may exist in the nominal AVHRR calibration, and even in updated calibrations, that cause a discontinuity in the long-term radiance record constructed from multiple satellites [Cao et al., 2008].

==== International Satellite Cloud Climatology Project (ISCCP) method ====
Brest and Rossow [1992], and the updated methodology [Brest et al., 1997], put forth a robust method for calibration monitoring of individual sensors and normalization of all sensors to a common standard. The International Satellite Cloud Climatology Project (ISCCP) method begins with the detection of clouds and corrections for ozone, Rayleigh scatter, and seasonal variations in irradiance to produce surface reflectances. Monthly histograms of surface reflectance are then produced for various surface types, and various histogram limits are then applied as a filter to the original sensor observations and ultimately aggregated to produce a global, cloud free surface reflectance.

After filtering, the global maps are segregated into monthly mean SURFACE, two bi-weekly SURFACE, and a mean TOTAL reflectance maps. The monthly mean SURFACE reflectance maps are used to detect long-term trends in calibration. The bi-weekly SURFACE maps are compared to each other and are used to detect short-term changes in calibration.

Finally, the TOTAL maps are used to detect and assess bias in the processing methodology. The target histograms are also examined, as changes in mode reflectances and in population are likely the result of changes in calibration.

==== Long-term record continuity ====
Long-term record continuity is achieved by the normalization between two sensors. First, observations from the operational time period overlap of two sensors are processed. Next, the two global SURFACE maps are compared via a scatter plot. Additionally, observations are corrected for changes in solar zenith angle caused by orbital drift. Ultimately, a line is fit to determine the overall long-term drift in calibration, and, after a sensor is corrected for drift, normalization is performed on observations that occur during the same operational period [Brest et al., 1997].

==== Calibration using the moderate-resolution imaging spectroradiometer ====
Another recent method for the absolute calibration of the AHVRR record makes use of the contemporary MODIS sensor onboard NASA's TERRA and AQUA satellites. The MODIS instrument has high calibration accuracy and can track its own radiometric changes due to the inclusion of an onboard calibration system for the VIS/NIR spectral region [MCST]. The following method utilizes the high accuracy of MODIS to absolutely calibrate AVHRRs via simultaneous nadir overpasses (SNOs) of both MODIS/AVHRR and AVHRR/AVHRR satellite pairs as well as MODIS-characterized surface reflectances for a Libyan Desert target and Dome-C in Antarctica [Heidinger et al., 2010]. Ultimately, each individual calibration event available (MODIS/AVHRR SNO, Dome C, Libyan Desert, or AVHRR/AVHRR SNO) is used to provide a calibration slope time series for a given AVHRR sensor. Heidinger et al. [2010] use a second-order polynomial from a least-squares fit to determine the time series.

The first step involves using a radiative transfer model that will convert observed MODIS scenes into those that a perfectly calibrated AVHRR would see. For MODIS/AVHRR SNO occurrences, it was determined that the ratio of AVHRR to MODIS radiances in both Ch1 and Ch2 are modeled well by a second-order polynomial of the radio of MODIS reflectances in channels 17 and 18. Channels 17 and 18 are located in a spectral region (0.94mm) sensitive to atmospheric water vapor, a quantity that affects the accurate calibration of AVHRR Ch. 2. Using the Ch17 to Ch 18 ratio, an accurate guess at the total precipitable water (TPW) is obtained to further increase the accuracy of MODIS to AVHRR SNO calibrations. The Libyan Desert and Dome-C calibration sites are used when MODIS/AVHRR SNOs do not occur. Here, the AVHRR to MODIS ratio of reflectances is modeled as a third-order polynomial using the natural logarithm of TWP from the NCEP reanalysis. Using these two methods, monthly calibration slopes are generated with a linear fit forced through the origin of the adjusted MODIS reflectances versus AVHRR counts.

To extend the MODIS reference back for AVHRRs prior to the MODIS era (pre-2000), Heidinger et al. [2010] use the stable Earth targets of Dome C in Antarctica and the Libyan Desert. MODIS mean nadir reflectances over the target are determined and are plotted versus the solar zenith angle. The counts for AVHRR observations at a given solar zenith angle and corresponding MODIS reflectance, corrected for TWP, are then used to determine what AVHRR value would be provided it had the MODIS calibration. The calibration slope is now calculated.

==== Calibration using direct AVHRR/AVHRR SNOs ====
One final method used by Heidinger et al. [2010] for extending the MODIS calibration back to AVHRRs that operated outside of the MODIS era is through direct AVHRR/AVHRR SNOs. Here, the counts from AVHRRs are plotted and a regression forced through the origin calculated. This regression is used to transfer the accurate calibration of one AVHRRs reflectances to the counts of an un-calibrated AVHRR and produce appropriate calibration slopes. These AVHRR/AVHRR SNOs do not provide an absolute calibration point themselves; rather they act as anchors for the relative calibration between AVHRRs that can be used to transfer the ultimate MODIS calibration.

== Next-generation system ==
Operational experience with the MODIS sensor onboard NASA's Terra and Aqua led to the development of AVHRR's follow-on, VIIRS. VIIRS is currently operating on board the Suomi NPP and NOAA-20 satellites. Whereas EUMETSAT MetOp satellites with AVHRR instruments will be succeeded by MetOp-SG satellites with a European MetImage instrument.

== Launch and service dates ==
Satellite name	Launch date	Service start	Service end
TIROS-N ['tairəus] [Television and Infrared Observation Satellite]	13 October 1978	19 October 1978	30 January 1980
NOAA-6	27 June 1979	27 June 1979	16 November 1986
NOAA-7	23 June 1981	24 August 1981	7 June 1986
NOAA-8	28 March 1983	3 May 1983	31 October 1985
NOAA-9	12 December 1984	25 February 1985	11 May 1994
NOAA-10	17 September 1986	17 November 1986	17 September 1991
NOAA-11	24 September 1988	8 November 1988	13 September 1994
NOAA-12	13 May 1991	14 May 1991	15 December 1994
NOAA-14	30 December 1994	30 December 1994	23 May 2007
NOAA-15	13 May 1998	13 May 1998	19 August 2025
NOAA-16	21 September 2000	21 September 2000	9 June 2014
NOAA-17	24 June 2002	24 June 2002	10 April 2013
NOAA-18	20 May 2005	30 August 2005	6 June 2025
NOAA-19	6 February 2009	2 June 2009	13 August 2025
Metop-A	19 October 2006	20 June 2007	15 November 2021
Metop-B	17 September 2012	24 April 2013	present
Metop-C	7 November 2018	3 July 2019	present
TIROS/NOAA dates from USGS website and from NOAA POES Status website

== See also ==
- Ocean temperature
