= Nimbus 4 =

Former U.S. meteorological satellite

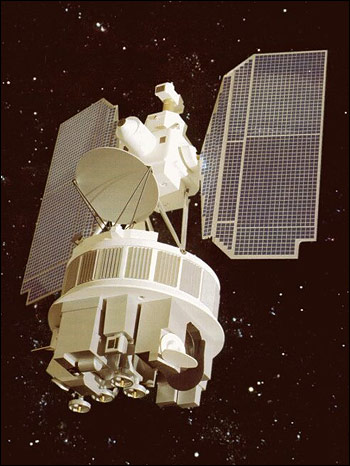
- Artist rendering of the Nimbus 4
- Mission type: Weather satellite
- Operator: NASA
- COSPAR ID: 1970-025A
- SATCAT no.: 4362
- Mission duration: 10 years and 5 months

Spacecraft properties
- Manufacturer: RCA Astrospace
- Launch mass: 619.6 kilograms (1,366 lb)
- Dimensions: 3.7 m × 1.5 m × 3.0 m (12.1 ft × 4.9 ft × 9.8 ft)

Start of mission
- Launch date: April 8, 1970, 08:17:56 UTC
- Rocket: Thorad-SLV2G Agena-D
- Launch site: Vandenberg SLC-2E

End of mission
- Last contact: September 30, 1980
- Decay date: September 30, 1980

Orbital parameters
- Reference system: Geocentric
- Regime: Low Earth
- Eccentricity: 0.00107
- Perigee altitude: 1,092 kilometers (679 mi)
- Apogee altitude: 1,108 kilometers (688 mi)
- Inclination: 80.114°
- Period: 107.2 minutes
- Epoch: April 8, 1970

Nimbus 4 (also called Nimbus D) was a meteorological satellite. It was the fourth in a series of the Nimbus program.

== Launch ==
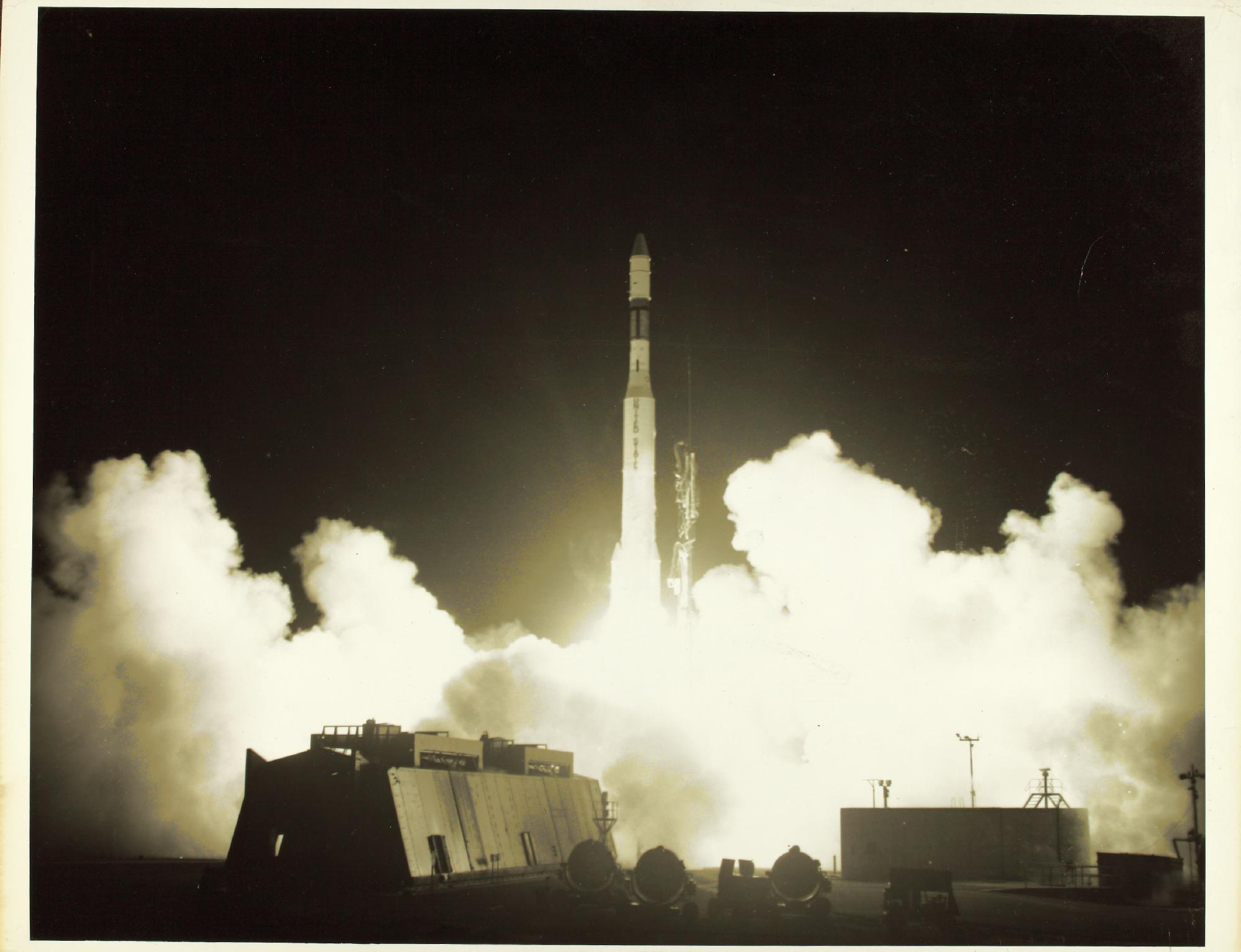
Nimbus IV launch

Nimbus 4 was launched on April 8, 1970, by a Thor-Agena rocket from Vandenberg Air Force Base in Lompoc, California, United States. The spacecraft functioned nominally until September 30, 1980. The satellite orbited the Earth once every 1 hour and 47 minutes, at an inclination of 80°. Its perigee was 1,092 kilometers (679 mi) and its apogee was 1,108 kilometers (688 mi).

== Mission ==
The fourth in a series of second-generation meteorological research and development satellites, Nimbus 4 was designed to serve as a stabilized, earth-oriented platform for the testing of advanced meteorological sensor systems, and for collecting meteorological data. The polar-orbiting spacecraft consisted of three major structures: a torus-shaped sensor mount, solar paddles, and the control system housing.

The solar paddles and the control system were connected to the sensor mount by a truss structure, giving the satellite the appearance of an ocean buoy. Nimbus 4 was nearly 3.7 metres (12 ft) tall, 1.45 metres (4.8 ft) in diameter at the base, and about 3 metres (9.8 ft) across with solar paddles extended. The torus-shaped sensor mount, which formed the satellite base, housed the electronics equipment and battery modules. The lower surface of the torus ring provided mounting space for sensors and telemetry antennas. An H-frame structure mounted within the center of the torus provided support for the larger experiments and tape recorders. Mounted on the control system housing, which was on top of the spacecraft, were Sun sensors, horizon scanners, gas nozzles for attitude control, and a command antenna. Use of an advanced attitude-control subsystem permitted the spacecraft's orientation to be controlled to within plus or minus 1 degree for all three axes (pitch, roll, yaw)

== Instruments ==
The primary experiments consisted of:

- Image Dissector Camera System (IDCS): for providing daytime cloud cover pictures, both in real-time and recorded modes;
- Temperature-Humidity Infrared Radiometer (THIR): for measuring daytime and nighttime surface and cloudtop temperatures, as well as the water vapor content of the upper atmosphere;
- Infrared Interferometer Spectrometer (IRIS): for measuring the emission spectra of the earth/atmosphere system;
- Satellite Infrared Spectrometer (SIRS): for determining the vertical profiles of temperature and water vapor in the atmosphere;
- Monitor of Ultraviolet Solar Energy (MUSE): for detecting solar UV radiation;
- Backscatter Ultraviolet Spectrometer (BUV): for monitoring the vertical distribution and total amount of atmospheric ozone on a global scale;
- Filter Wedge Spectrometer (FWS): for accurate measurement of IR radiance as a function of wavelength from the earth/atmosphere system;
- Selective Chopper Radiometer (SCR): for determining the temperatures of six successive 10 km (6.2 mi) layers in the atmosphere from absorption measurements in the 15 μm CO_{2} band;
- Interrogation, Recording, and Location System (IRLS): for locating, interrogating, recording, and retransmitting meteorological and geophysical data from remote collection stations.

The spacecraft performed well until April 14, 1971, when attitude problems started. The experiments continued to operate on a limited time basis until September 30, 1980.
