= Total Ozone Mapping Spectrometer =

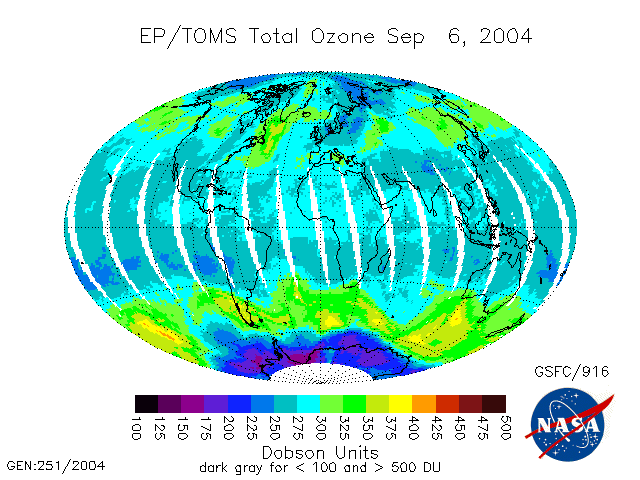
Near-global ozone for September 6, 2004, by TOMS-EP

The Total Ozone Mapping Spectrometer (TOMS) was a NASA satellite instrument, specifically a spectrometer, for measuring the ozone layer. Of the five TOMS instruments which were built, four entered successful orbit. The satellites carrying TOMS instruments were:

- Nimbus 7; launched October 24, 1978. Operated until 1 August 1994. Carried TOMS instrument number 1.
- Meteor-3-5; launched 15 August 1991. Operated until December 1994. Was the first and last Soviet satellite to carry a USA made instrument. Carried TOMS instrument number 2.
- ADEOS I; launched 17 August 1996. Operated until 30 June 1997. Mission was cut short by a spacecraft failure.
- TOMS-Earth Probe; launched on July 2, 1996. Operated until 2 December 2006. Carried TOMS instrument number 3.
- QuikTOMS; launched 21 September 2001. Suffered launch failure and did not enter orbit.

Nimbus 7 and Meteor-3-5 provided global measurements of total column ozone on a daily basis and together provided a complete data set of daily ozone from November 1978 to December 1994. After an eighteen-month period when the program had no on-orbit capability, TOMS-Earth Probe launched on 2 July 1996, followed by ADEOS I. ADEOS I was launched on August 17, 1996, and the TOMS-instrument onboard provided data until the satellite which housed it lost power on June 30, 1997.

TOMS-Earth Probe (Total Ozone Mapping Spectrometer - Earth Probe, TOMS-EP, originally just TOMS, COSPAR 1996-037A) was launched on July 2, 1996, from Vandenberg AFB by a Pegasus XL rocket. The satellite project was originally known as TOMS, back in 1989 when it was selected as a SMEX mission in the Explorer program. However, it found no funding as an Explorer mission and transferred to NASA's Earth Probe program, getting funding and becoming TOMS-EP. The small, 295 kg satellite was built for NASA by TRW; the single instrument was the TOMS 3 spectrometer. The satellite had a two-year planned life. TOMS-EP suffered a two-year delay to its launch due to launch failures of the first two Pegasus XL rockets. The launch delays led to alternations in the mission; the satellite was placed in a lower than originally planned orbit to achieve higher resolution and to enable more thorough study of UV-absorbing aerosols in the troposphere. The lower orbit was meant to complement measurements from ADEOS I enabling TOMS-EP to provide supplemental measurements. After ADEOS I failed in orbit, TOMS-EP was boosted to a higher orbit to replace ADEOS I. The transmitter for TOMS-Earth Probe failed on December 2, 2006.

The only total failure in the series was QuikTOMS, which was launched on September 21, 2001, on a Taurus rocket from Vandenberg AFB, but did not achieve orbit.

Since January 1, 2006, data from the Aura Ozone Monitoring Instrument (OMI) has replaced data from TOMS-Earth Probe. The Ozone Mapping and Profiler Suite on Suomi NPP and NOAA-20 have further continued the data record.

== Gallery ==
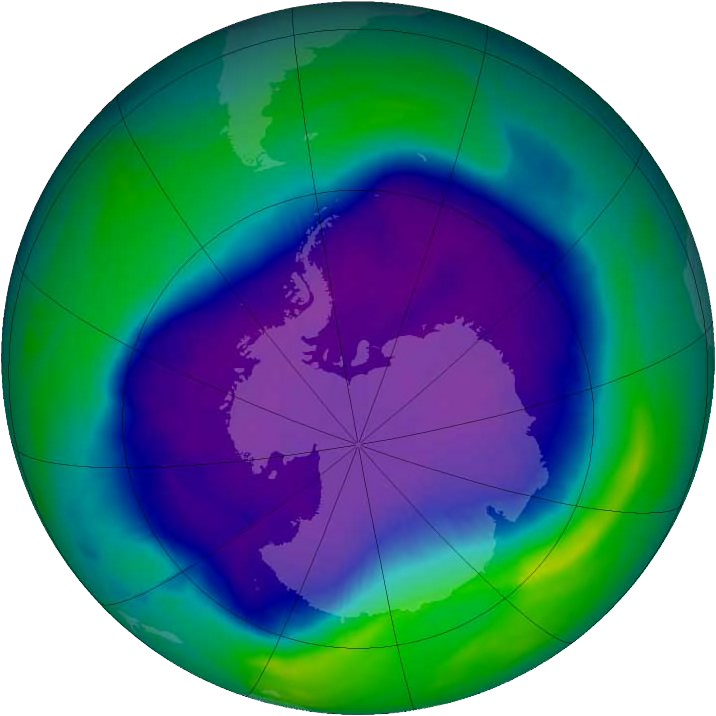
Image of the largest Antarctic ozone hole recorded to date (September 2006).

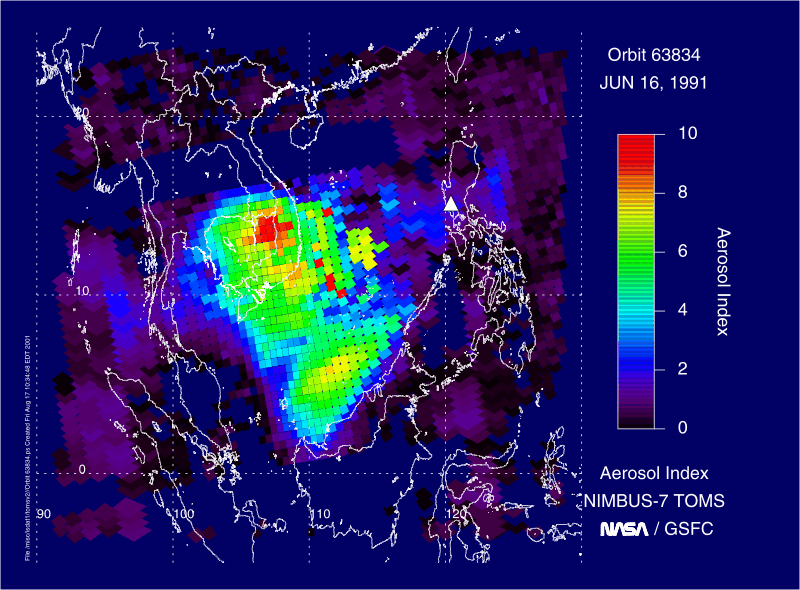
Mount Pinatubo 1991 ash and aerosol.

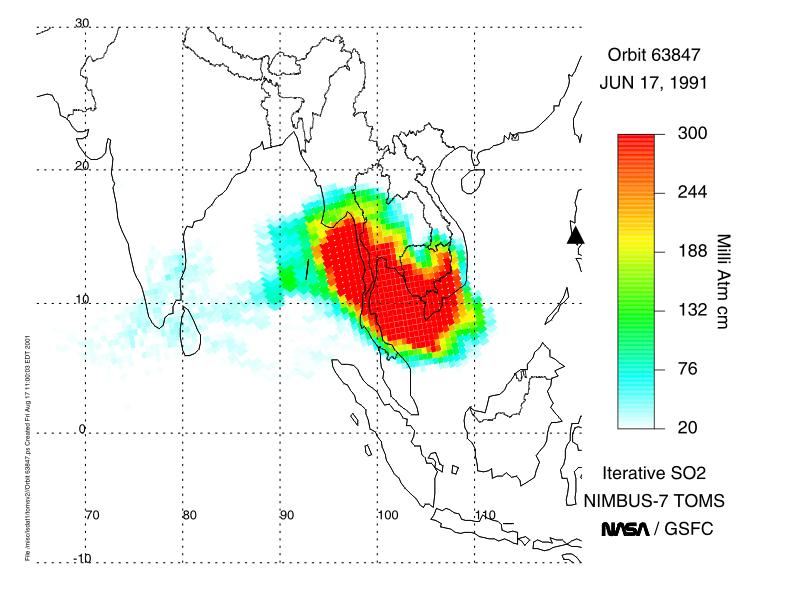
Mount Pinatubo 1991 sulfur dioxide.

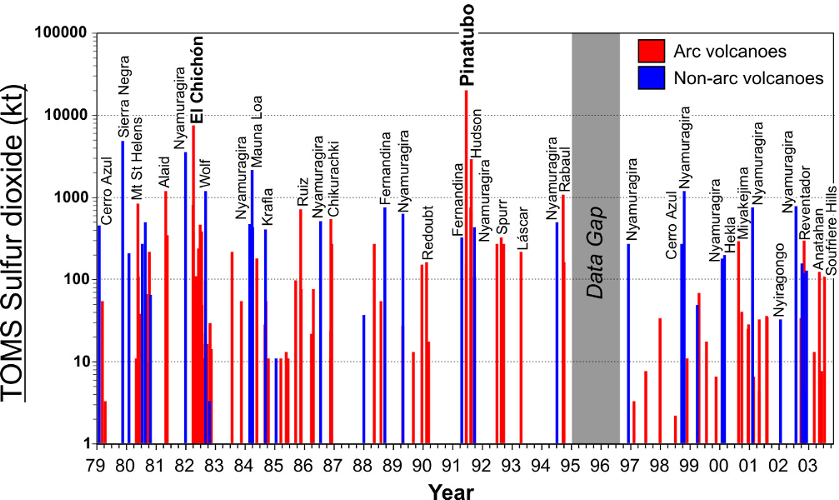
Sulfur dioxide emissions from volcanoes.
