= Ozone monitoring instrument =

Earth observation satellite

Ozone Monitoring Instrument on-board Aura-Satellite
- Overview of OMI/Aura by NASA
- Manufacturer: Dutch Space
- Designer: Netherlands Agency for Aerospace Programmes, Finnish Meteorological Institute and the National Aeronautics and Space Agency (NASA)
- Country of origin: Netherlands
- Operator: NASA
- Applications: Atmospheric composition, air pollution, ozone layer monitoring

Specifications
- Constellation: A-Train
- Launch mass: 5 kg (OMI)
- Dimensions: 50x40x35 cm^{3} (OMI)
- Power: 66 watts (OMI)
- Regime: Sun-Synchronous (Aura Satellite)
- Design life: 20 years

The ozone monitoring instrument (OMI) is a nadir-viewing visual and ultraviolet spectrometer aboard the NASA Aura spacecraft, which is part of the satellite constellation A-Train. In this group of satellites Aura flies in formation about 15 minutes behind Aqua satellite, both of which orbit the Earth in a polar Sun-synchronous pattern, and which provides nearly global coverage in one day. Aura satellite was launched on July 15, 2004, and OMI has collected data since August 9, 2004.

From a technical point of view, OMI instrument use hyperspectral imaging to observe solar-backscatter radiation to the space with an spectral range that covers the visible and ultraviolet. Its spectral capabilities were designed to achieve specific requirements of total ozone amounts retrievals in terms of accuracy and precision. Also its characteristics provide accurate radiometric and wavelength self calibration over the long-term project requirements.

== OMI project ==
The OMI project is a cooperation between the Netherlands Agency for Aerospace Programmes (NIVR), the Finnish Meteorological Institute (FMI) and the National Aeronautics and Space Agency (NASA).

The OMI project was carried out under the direction of the NIVR and financed by the Dutch Ministries of Economic Affairs, Transport and Public Works and the Ministry of Education and Science. The instrument was built by Dutch Space in co-operation with Netherlands Organisation for Applied Scientific Research Science and Industry and Netherlands Institute for Space Research. The Finnish industry supplied the electronics. The scientific part of the OMI project is managed by KNMI (principal investigator Prof. Dr. P. F. Levelt now at the Delft University of Technology), in close co-operation with NASA and the Finnish Meteorological Institute.

== Scientific objectives and atmospheric monitoring ==
One of the scientific objectives of OMI is to measure trace gases: ozone (O_{3}), nitrogen dioxide (NO_{2}), sulfur dioxide (SO_{2}), formaldehyde (HCHO), BrO, and OClO. However, OMI sensors can distinguish between aerosol types, such as smoke, dust, and sulfates, and can measure cloud pressure and cloud coverage, which provide data to derive tropospheric ozone. In that regard OMI follows in the heritage of TOMS, SBUV, GOME, SCIAMACHY, and GOMOS. On top of that, OMI aims to detect emissions in volcanic eruptions with up to at least 100 times more sensitivity than TOMS. The Ozone Monitoring Instrument has been proved a useful platform to monitor other traces gases like Glyoxal, variables like surface UV radiation, or total column estimations like the water vapor, NO_{2} and Ozone. Has been uses in operational services by European Centre for Medium-range Weather Forecasts (ECMWF), the US National Oceanic and Atmospheric Administration (NOAA) for ozone and air quality forecasts, and the Volcanic Ash Advisory Centers (VAACs) for the rerouting of aircraft in case of a volcanic eruption.

== Instrument Information ==
The instrument observes Earth's backscattered radiation and uses two imaging grating spectrometers, and each grating spectrometer is coupled to a CCD detector with 780x576 (spectral x spatial) pixels. The instrument can operate in two different modes: the normal operational mode where a single pixel in the observation has an spatial resolution 13x24 km^{2} at nadir (straight down), and the zoom mode where this resolution is increased to 13x12 km^{2}.

=== Spectral Information ===
Spectral information. Full Width at Half Maximum (FWHM) is also refereed as Average Spectral Resolution. Average Spectral Sampling Distance (ASSD).
Channel	Total Range	Full Performance Range	FWHM	ASSD (nm/pixel)
UV-1	264-311 nm	270-310 nm	0.63	0.33
UV-2	307-383 nm	310-365 nm	0.42	0.14
VIS	349-504 nm	365-504 nm	0.63	0.21

OMI measurements cover a spectral region of 264–504 nm (nanometers) with a spectral resolution between 0.42 nm and 0.63 nm and a nominal ground footprint of 13 × 24 km^{2} at nadir. This spectral coverage is divided in three different channels two of them in the ultraviolet range, and one in the visible spectrum. Note that the ground pixel size of the UV-1 channel is twice as large in the swath direction compared to the other two channels, this optical design of the UV channel were done to reduce straylight in this wavelength range.

=== Orbital Information ===
The Aura satellite orbits at an altitude of 705 km in a sun-synchronous polar orbit with an exact 16-day repeat cycle and with a local equator crossing time of 13. 45 ( 1:45 P.M.) on the ascending node. The orbital inclination is 98.1 degrees, providing latitudinal coverage from 82° N to 82° S. It is a wide-field-imaging spectrometer with a 114° across-track viewing angle range that provides a 2600 km wide swath, enabling measurements with a daily global coverage.

=== Calibration and Validation ===
The discussion of the calibration and validation processes began before the launch of Aura Satellite. Once the instrument was in orbit the information of these calibration was published, showing specific details of the absolute radiometric calibration, the bi-directional scattering distribution function (BSDF) calibration and the spectral calibration carried on. Note also that the instrument is equipped with an internal white light source for detector calibration purposes. The validation, which aim to assess the inherent uncertainties in satellite data products of the instrument together with retrieval algorithms used for each data product, was carried on continuously since the launch of Aura satellite. The validation include products like: total ozone column, NO_{2}, ozone vertical profiles.

=== In-flight performance ===
One important aspect of satellite instruments for scientific measurements is the evolution of the performance during the life-cycle of the sensors, as well as, the continuous evaluation of the quality of the data products. In the case of an instrument like OMI the main aspects to consider are: the radiometric and spectral stability, the row anomaly, and detector degradation. In the first aspect: the radiometric degradation of OMI ranges from ~2% in the UV channels to ~0.5% in the VIS channel, which is much lower than any other similar satellite instrument. Regarding the wavelength calibration of the instrument it remains stable to 0.005–0.020 nm which indicates a high wavelength stability. It was detected a row anomaly due, probably, to a partial cover of the instrument, warning flags were included in the raw products to avoid the use of these specific rows and keep the quality of the retrieval products. Further information of the long-term calibration indicated in 2017 that the instrument will be able to provide useful science data for another 5 to 10 years.

== Scientific relevance ==
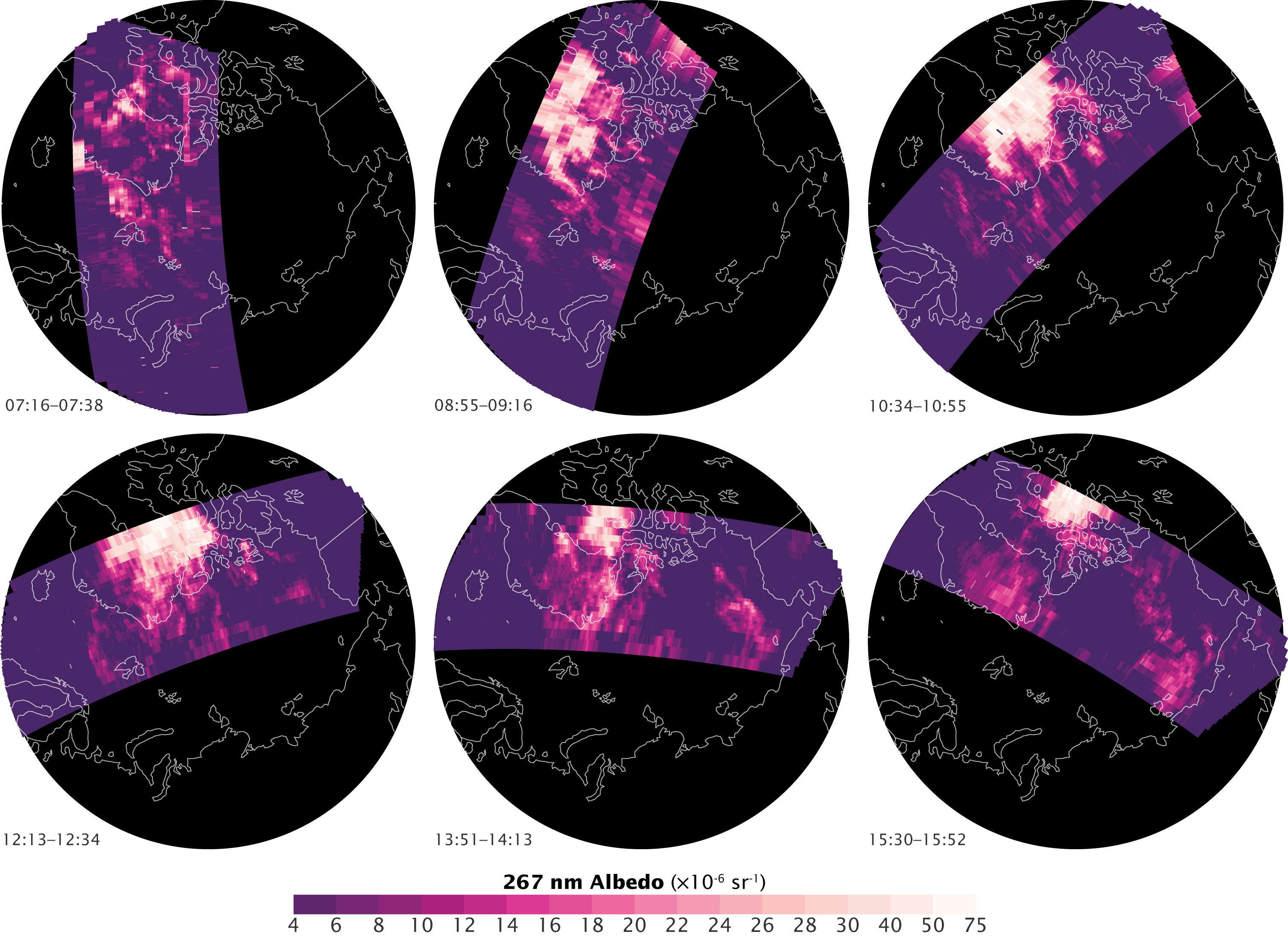
Image of polar mesospheric clouds taken on 10 July 2007 by OMI

The OMI project has been monitoring the atmospheric composition and providing measurements widely used in the field of atmospheric chemistry research. The fact that it has been operational for more than a decade makes it also useful for trend monitoring. The reference describing the first 14 years of the OMI details the research data products provided by NASA, KNMI, FMI and SAO, also according to these authors, beyond the initial goals, OMI has been important due the high-resolution NO_{2} and SO_{2} measurements (OMI is the first instrument that is able to obtain daily global coverage combined with such spatial resolution), and the fact that top-down studies allowed for source attribution analyses.

=== Awards ===
The International Team of the Ozone Monitoring Instrument has received several awards for its contributions to a better understanding of the Earth system:

- USGS 2018 Pecora Award The Pecora award is annual to recognize individuals or teams using remote sensing in the field of Earth Science. It consider not only the scientific role but also its role informing decision makers and supporting natural or human-induced disaster responses.
- 2021 AMS Special Award A broad description of this award to OMI International Team is given as an AMS video.
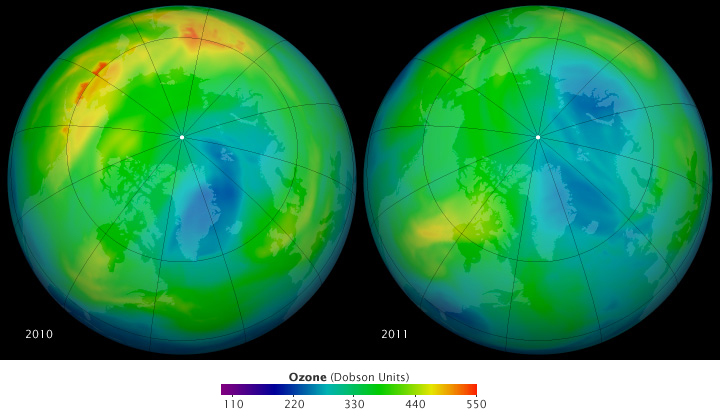
  These maps of ozone concentrations over the Arctic come from the Ozone Monitoring Instrument (OMI) on NASA's Aura satellite. The left image shows March 19, 2010, and the right shows the same date in 2011.

=== Contributions to scientific research ===
- Assessment of the Montreal Protocol: the instrument has proved stability to provide long-term data record for monitoring the ozone layer, which is the particular interest to evaluate the possible recovery of the ozone depletion in the southern hemisphere.
- Global concentrations of trace gases: the OMI data show a steady decline in concentrations of NO_{2} in the United States, Europe, and Japan, whereas in China, first strong increases were observed, followed by decreases after 2014.
- Absorbing aerosol that can cause warming: OMI can provide information as from its ultraviolet (UV) channel it is possible to derive such absorbing capacity.
- Long-term data record of tropospheric ozone has been established: Tropospheric ozone assessment is important as it is the third main anthropogenic greenhouse gas, and the fraction of ozone in the troposphere can be derived from the OMI data, either by itself alone or in combination with other instruments
- OMI formaldehyde retrievals indicate increases of this trace gas over India and China, and a downward trend over the Amazonian forest, spatially correlated with areas affected by deforestation
- OMI has been the first satellite instrument to be used for daily monitoring of volcanic emissions
- OMI satellite products of Ozone total column has been used for data assimilation en IFS model by ECMWF
