= List of Atlas launches (1980–1989) =

== Launch statistics ==
=== Rocket configurations ===
- Atlas SLV
- Atlas E/F
- Atlas H
- Atlas G

=== Launch sites ===
- Cape Canaveral SLC-36A
- Cape Canaveral SLC-36B
- Vandenberg SLC-3E
- Vandenberg SLC-3W

=== Launch outcomes ===
- Success
- Partial failure
- Failure

== 1980 ==
Date/Time (UTC)	Rocket	S/N	Launch site	Payload	Function	Orbit	Outcome	Remarks
1980-01-18; 01:26:00	Atlas-Centaur SLV-3D	AC-49	CCAFS, LC-36A	FLTSATCOM-3	Communications satellite	GTO	Success	
1980-02-09; 23:08:00	Atlas E/F-SVS	35F	VAFB, SLC-3E	GPS-5	Navigation satellite	MEO	Success	
1980-03-03; 09:27:00	Atlas E/F-MSD	67F	VAFB, SLC-3W	OPS-7245 (NOSS-3)	ELINT	LEO	Success	
1980-04-26; 22:00:00	Atlas E/F-SVS	34F	VAFB, SLC-3E	GPS-6	Navigation satellite	MEO	Success	
1980-05-29; 10:53:00	Atlas E/F-Star-37S-ISS	19F	VAFB, SLC-3W	NOAA-B	Weather satellite	SSO	Failure	Loose seal resulted in flooded B-1 turbopump and low thrust; sustainer engine compensated by extending burn time, but the upper stage ignited while still attached to the Atlas and was left in a useless orbit.
1980-10-31; 03:54:00	Atlas-Centaur SLV-3D	AC-57	CCAFS, LC-36A	FLTSATCOM-4	Communications satellite	GTO	Success	
1980-12-06; 23:31:00	Atlas-Centaur SLV-3D	AC-54	CCAFS, LC-36B	Intelsat V F-2	COMSAT	GTO	Success	
1980-12-09; 07:18:00	Atlas E/F-MSD	68E	VAFB, SLC-3W	NOSS-4	ELINT	LEO	Failure	Loss of turbopump lubricant caused B-1 engine shut down just prior to booster jettison; vehicle flipped around 180° and descended back towards Earth, breaking up as it fell.

== 1981 ==
Date/Time (UTC)	Rocket	S/N	Launch site	Payload	Function	Orbit	Outcome	Remarks
1981-02-21; 23:23:00	Atlas-Centaur SLV-3D	AC-42	CCAFS LC-36A	Comstar D4	Communications satellite	GTO	Success	
1981-05-23; 22:42:00	Atlas-Centaur SLV-3D	AC-56	CCAFS, LC-36B	Intelsat V F-1	COMSAT	GTO	Success	
1981-06-23; 10:52:59	Atlas E/F-Star-37S-ISS	87F	VAFB, SLC-3W	NOAA-7 (NOAA-C)	Weather satellite	SSO	Success	
1981-08-06; 08:16:00	Atlas-Centaur SLV-3D	AC-59	CCAFS, LC-36A	FLTSATCOM-5	Communications satellite	GTO	Partial failure	Fairing collapsed during ascent, damaging spacecraft
1981-12-15; 23:35	Atlas-Centaur SLV-3D	AC-55	CCAFS, LC-36B	Intelsat V F-3	COMSAT	GTO	Success	
1981-12-19; 01:10	Atlas E/F-SVS	76E	VAFB, SLC-3E	GPS-7	Navigation satellite	MEO (target)	Failure	B-2 engine shutdown at T+7 seconds due to sealant plugging up the gas generator; vehicle destroyed by Range Safety Officer just before impacting the ground at T+20 seconds

== 1982 ==
Date/Time (UTC)	Rocket	S/N	Launch site	Payload	Function	Orbit	Outcome	Remarks
1982-03-05; 00:23	Atlas-Centaur SLV-3D	AC-58	CCAFS LC-36A	Intelsat V -504	Comsat	GTO	Success	
1982-09-28; 23:17	Atlas-Centaur SLV-3D	AC-60	CCAFS LC-36B	Intelsat V -505	Comsat	GTO	Success	
1982-12-21; 02:38	Atlas E/F-Star-37S-ISS	60E	VAFB SLC-3W	DMSP 5D-2/F6	Weather satellite	LEO	Success	

== 1983 ==
Date/Time (UTC)	Rocket	S/N	Launch site	Payload	Function	Orbit	Outcome	Remarks
1983-02-09; 13:47	Atlas H	6001H	VAFB SLC-3E	OPS-0252 (NOSS-5)	ELINT	LEO	Success	Maiden flight of Atlas H
1983-03-28; 15:52:00	Atlas E/F-Star-37S-ISS	73E	VAFB, SLC-3W	NOAA-8 (NOAA-E)	Weather satellite	SSO	Success	
1983-05-19; 22:26	Atlas-Centaur SLV-3D	AC-61	CCAFS LC-36A	Intelsat V -506	Comsat	GTO	Success	
1983-06-09; 23:23	Atlas H	6002H	VAFB SLC-3E	OPS-6432 (NOSS-6)	ELINT	LEO	Success	
1983-07-14; 10:21	Atlas E/F-SGS-2	75E	VAFB SLC-3W	GPS-8	Navigation satellite	MEO	Success	
1983-11-18; 06:32	Atlas E/F-Star-37S-ISS	58E	VAFB SLC-3W	DMSP 5D-2/F7	Weather satellite	LEO	Success	

== 1984 ==
Date/Time (UTC)	Rocket	S/N	Launch site	Payload	Function	Orbit	Outcome	Remarks
1984-02-05; 18:44	Atlas H	6003H	VAFB SLC-3E	OPS-8737 (NOSS-7)	ELINT	LEO	Success	
1984-06-09; 23:03	Atlas G	AC-62	CCAFS LC-36B	Intelsat V -509	Comsat	GTO (target); LEO (achieved)	Failure	Maiden flight of Atlas G. Centaur LOX tank rupture during coasting phase.
1984-06-13; 11:37	Atlas E/F-SGS-2	42E	VAFB SLC-3W	USA-1 (GPS-9)	Navigation satellite	MEO	Success	
1984-09-08; 21:41	Atlas E/F-SGS-2	14E	VAFB SLC-3W	USA-5 (GPS-10)	Navigation satellite	MEO	Success	
1984-12-12; 10:42:00	Atlas E/F-Star-37S-ISS	39E	VAFB, SLC-3W	NOAA-9 (NOAA-F)	Weather satellite	SSO	Success	

== 1985 ==
Date/Time (UTC)	Rocket	S/N	Launch site	Payload	Function	Orbit	Outcome	Remarks
1985-03-13; 02:00	Atlas E/F-OIS	41E	VAFB SLC-3W	Geosat		LEO	Success	
1985-03-22; 23:55	Atlas G	AC-63	CCAFS LC-36B	Intelsat V -510	Comsat	GTO	Success	
1985-06-30; 00:44	Atlas G	AC-64	CCAFS LC-36B	Intelsat V -511	Comsat	GTO	Success	
1985-09-28; 23:17	Atlas G	AC-65	CCAFS LC-36B	Intelsat V -512	Comsat	GTO	Success	
1985-10-09; 02:53	Atlas E/F-SGS-2	55E	VAFB SLC-3W	USA-10 (GPS-11)	Navigation satellite	MEO	Success	

== 1986 ==
Date/Time (UTC)	Rocket	S/N	Launch site	Payload	Function	Orbit	Outcome	Remarks
1986-02-09; 10:06	Atlas H	6004H	VAFB SLC-3E	USA-15/16/17/18 (NOSS-8)	ELINT	LEO	Success	
1986-09-17; 15:52	Atlas E/F-Star-37S-ISS	52E	VAFB, SLC-3W	NOAA-10 (NOAA-G)	Weather satellite	LEO	Success	
1986-12-05; 02:30:01	Atlas G	AC-66	CCAFS LC-36B	USA-20 (FLTSATCOM-7)	Comsat	GTO	Success	

== 1987 ==
Date/Time (UTC)	Rocket	S/N	Launch site	Payload	Function	Orbit	Outcome	Remarks
1987-03-26; 21:22:00	Atlas G	AC-67	CCAFS LC-36B	FLTSATCOM-6	Comsat	GTO (target)	Failure	Launched into a thunderstorm. Booster was struck by lightning shortly after liftoff, damaging the guidance computer and sending an erroneous pitch down command that resulted in vehicle breakup.
1987-05-15; 15:45	Atlas H	6005H	VAFB SLC-3E	USA-22/23/24/25 (NOSS-9)	ELINT	LEO	Success	Final flight of Atlas H
1987-06-20; 02:34	Atlas E/F-Star-37S-ISS	59E	VAFB SLC-3W	USA-26 (DMSP 5D-2/F8)	Weather satellite	LEO	Success	

== 1988 ==
Date/Time (UTC)	Rocket	S/N	Launch site	Payload	Function	Orbit	Outcome	Remarks
1988-02-03; 05:53	Atlas E/F-Star-37S-ISS	54E	VAFB, SLC-3W	USA-29 DMSP 5D-2/F9	Weather satellite	SSO	Success	
1988-09-24; 10:02:00	Atlas E/F-Star-37S-ISS	63E	VAFB, SLC-3W	NOAA-11 (NOAA-H)	Weather satellite	SSO	Success	

== 1989 ==
Date/Time (UTC)	Rocket	S/N	Launch site	Payload	Function	Orbit	Outcome	Remarks
1989-09-25; 08:56:02	Atlas G	AC-68	CCAFS LC-36B	USA-46 (FLTSATCOM-8)	Comsat	GTO	Success	Final flight of Atlas G
