= List of NOAA satellites =

This is a list of satellites owned and operated (formerly or currently) by the National Oceanic and Atmospheric Administration (NOAA), as well as planned, failed, and cancelled launches.

Program(s)	Generation	Launch designation	Operational designation	Launch date	Decommission date
ITOS	3rd Gen POES	ITOS-A	NOAA-1	December 11, 1970	August 19, 1971
ITOS	3rd Gen POES	ITOS-D	NOAA-2	October 15, 1972	January 30, 1975
ITOS	3rd Gen POES	ITOS-F	NOAA-3	November 6, 1973	August 31, 1976
ITOS	3rd Gen POES	ITOS-G	NOAA-4	November 15, 1974	November 18, 1978
ITOS	3rd Gen POES	ITOS-H	NOAA-5	July 29, 1976	July 16, 1979
GOES	SMS Derived	GOES-A	GOES-1	October 16, 1975	March 7, 1995
GOES	SMS Derived	GOES-B	GOES-2	June 16, 1977	May 5, 2001
GOES	SMS Derived	GOES-C	GOES-3	June 16, 1978	June 29, 2016
POES	4th Gen POES	NOAA-A	NOAA-6	June 27, 1979	March 31, 1987
POES	4th Gen POES	NOAA-B	N/A	May 29, 1980	Launch failure
POES	4th Gen POES	NOAA-C	NOAA-7	June 23, 1981	June 7, 1986
POES	4th Gen POES	NOAA-E	NOAA-8	March 28, 1983	December 29, 1985
POES	4th Gen POES	NOAA-F	NOAA-9	December 12, 1984	February 13, 1998
POES	4th Gen POES	NOAA-G	NOAA-10	September 17, 1986	August 30, 2001
POES	4th Gen POES	NOAA-H	NOAA-11	September 24, 1988	June 16, 2004
POES	4th Gen POES	NOAA-D	NOAA-12	May 14, 1991	August 10, 2007
POES	4th Gen POES	NOAA-I	NOAA-13	August 9, 1993	August 21, 1993
POES	4th Gen POES	NOAA-J	NOAA-14	December 30, 1994	May 23, 2007
GOES	1st Gen GOES	GOES-D	GOES-4	September 9, 1980	November 11, 1988
GOES	1st Gen GOES	GOES-E	GOES-5	May 15, 1981	July 18, 1990
GOES	1st Gen GOES	GOES-F	GOES-6	April 28, 1983	May 24, 1992
GOES	1st Gen GOES	GOES-G	N/A	May 3, 1986	Failed Orbit
GOES	1st Gen GOES	GOES-H	GOES-7	February 26, 1987	April 12, 2012
GOES	2nd Gen GOES	GOES-I	GOES-8	April 13, 1994	May 5, 2004
GOES	2nd Gen GOES	GOES-J	GOES-9	May 23, 1995	July 28, 1998
GOES	2nd Gen GOES	GOES-K	GOES-10	April 25, 1997	December 02, 2009
GOES	2nd Gen GOES	GOES-L	GOES-11	May 3, 2000	December 16, 2011
GOES	2nd Gen GOES	GOES-M	GOES-12	July 23, 2001	August 16, 2013
POES	5th Gen POES	NOAA-K	NOAA-15	May 13, 1998	August 19, 2025
POES	5th Gen POES	NOAA-L	NOAA-16	September 21, 2000	September 17, 2003
POES	5th Gen POES	NOAA-M	NOAA-17	June 24, 2002	April 10, 2013
POES	5th Gen POES	NOAA-N	NOAA-18	May 20, 2005	June 6, 2025
POES	5th Gen POES	NOAA-N Prime	NOAA-19	February 6, 2009	August 13, 2025
NOAA Jason / NASA OSTM	N/A	JASON-1	JASON-1	December 7, 2001	July 1, 2013
NOAA Jason / NASA OSTM	N/A	JASON-2	JASON-2	June 20, 2008	October 10, 2019
NOAA Jason / NASA OSTM	N/A	JASON-3	JASON-3	January 17, 2016	
GOES	3rd Gen GOES	GOES-N	GOES-13 EWS-G1	May 24, 2006	
GOES	3rd Gen GOES	GOES-O	GOES-14	June 27, 2009	
GOES	3rd Gen GOES	GOES-P	GOES-15	March 4, 2010	
GOES	3rd Gen GOES	GOES-Q	N/A	Cancelled	Cancelled
SUOMI-NPP / JPSS	N/A	SUOMI-NPP	SUOMI-NPP	October 28, 2011	
JPSS	N/A	JPSS-1	NOAA-20	November 18, 2017	
JPSS	N/A	JPSS-2	NOAA-21	November 10, 2022	
JPSS	N/A	JPSS-3	NOAA-23	2033 (predicted as of July 2026)	
JPSS	N/A	JPSS-4	NOAA-22	2028 (predicted as of July 2026)	
GOES	4th Gen GOES	GOES-R	GOES-16	November 19, 2016	
GOES	4th Gen GOES	GOES-S	GOES-17	March 1, 2018	
GOES	4th Gen GOES	GOES-T	GOES-18	March 1, 2022	
GOES	4th Gen GOES	GOES-U	GOES-19	June 25, 2024	
DSCOVR	1st Gen Deep Space Satellite	DSCOVR	DSCOVR	February 11, 2015	
SWFO	2nd Gen Deep Space Satellite	SWFO-L1	SOLAR-1	September 24, 2025	
