= ESMR =

ESMR may refer to:

- Electrically Scanning Microwave Radiometer
- Enhanced Specialized Mobile Radio
- Extracorporeal Shockwave Myocardial Revascularization
