= USA-1 =

USA-1 may refer to:

- USA-1 (satellite), an early GPS navigation satellite
- USA-1 (monster truck), a monster truck built in the 1970s
