= Intelsat V F-1 =

Geostationary communications satellite

Intelsat V F-1 → Intelsat 501
- Mission type: Communications
- Operator: COMSAT / INTELSAT
- COSPAR ID: 1981-050A
- SATCAT no.: 12474
- Mission duration: 7 years (planned)

Spacecraft properties
- Bus: Intelsat V
- Manufacturer: Ford Aerospace
- Launch mass: 1928 kg
- Dry mass: 1012 kg
- Dimensions: 1.66 x 2.1 x 1.77 metres
- Power: 1800 watts

Start of mission
- Launch date: 23 May 1981, 22:42:00 UTC
- Rocket: Atlas SLV-3D Centaur (AC-56)
- Launch site: CCAFS, LC-36B
- Contractor: General Dynamics

End of mission
- Disposal: Graveyard orbit
- Deactivated: February 1997

Orbital parameters
- Reference system: Geocentric orbit
- Regime: Geostationary orbit
- Longitude: 177.0° West (1981-1992); 91.5° East (1992-1996); 72.0° East (1996-1997)
- Epoch: 23 May 1981

Transponders
- Band: 21 C-band; 4 Ku-band

Intelsat V F-1 (or Intelsat 501) was a geostationary communications satellite built by Ford Aerospace, it was owned by COMSAT. Launched in 1981, it was the second of fifteen Intelsat V satellites to be launched. The satellite was based on the Intelsat V platform and its estimated useful life was seven years.

== Satellite ==
The satellite was box-shaped, measuring 1.66 by 2.1 by 1.77 metres; solar arrays spanned 15.9 metres tip to tip. The arrays, supplemented by nickel-hydrogen batteries during eclipse, provided 1800 watts of power. The payload housed 21 C-band and 4 Ku-band transponders. It could accommodate 15,000 two-way voice circuits and two TV channels simultaneously. It had a launch mass of 1928 kg. The satellite was deactivated in February 1997.

== Launch ==
The satellite was successfully launched into space on 23 May 1981, at 22:42:00 UTC, by means of an Atlas SLV-3D Centaur vehicle from the CCAFS, LC-36B.

== See also ==
- 1981 in spaceflight
