= NOAA-12 =

American weather satellite (1991-2007)

- Names: NOAA-D
- Mission type: Weather
- Operator: NOAA
- COSPAR ID: 1991-032A
- SATCAT no.: 21263
- Mission duration: 2 years (planned); 16 years (achieved)

Spacecraft properties
- Spacecraft: TIROS
- Bus: TIROS-N
- Manufacturer: RCA Astro Electronics
- Launch mass: 1,418 kg (3,126 lb)
- Dry mass: 735 kg (1,620 lb)
- Dimensions: Spacecraft: 3.71 m × 1.88 m (12.2 ft × 6.2 ft); Solar array: 2.37 m × 4.91 m (7 ft 9 in × 16 ft 1 in)

Start of mission
- Launch date: 14 May 1991, 15:52:03 UTC
- Rocket: Atlas-E Star-37S-ISS (Atlas S/N 50E)
- Launch site: Vandenberg, SLC-3W
- Contractor: Convair

End of mission
- Disposal: Decommissioned
- Last contact: 10 August 2007

Orbital parameters
- Reference system: Geocentric orbit
- Regime: Sun-synchronous orbit
- Perigee altitude: 821 km (510 mi)
- Apogee altitude: 841 km (523 mi)
- Inclination: 98.70°
- Period: 101.3 minutes
Instruments
- AVHRR/2: Advanced Very High Resolution Radiometer
- TOVS: TIROS Operational Vertical Sounder
- SEM: Space Environment Monitor
- DCS (Argos): Data Collection System

NOAA-12, also known as NOAA-D before launch, was an American weather satellite operated by National Oceanic and Atmospheric Administration (NOAA), an operational meteorological satellite for use in the National Environmental Satellite, Data, and Information Service (NESDIS). The satellite design provided an economical and stable Sun-synchronous platform for advanced operational instruments to measure the atmosphere of Earth, its surface and cloud cover, and the near-space environment.

== Launch ==
It was launched into a Sun-synchronous orbit by NASA aboard an Atlas E S/N 50E launch vehicle on 14 May 1991 from Vandenberg Air Force Base, Vandenberg Space Launch Complex 3 (SLC-3W), California.

== Spacecraft ==
The satellite was based upon the DMSP Block 5D satellite bus developed for the U.S. Air Force, and it was capable of maintaining an Earth-pointing accuracy of better than ± 0.1° with a motion rate of less than 0.035 degrees/second. Based on the experimental TIROS-N satellite, it performed monitoring of ice and snow cover, agriculture, oceanography, volcanism, ozone and the space environment, in addition to its regular meteorological observations. The satellite design provides an economical and stable sun-synchronous (morning equator-crossing) platform for advanced operational instruments to measure the Atmosphere of Earth, its surface and cloud cover, and the near-space environment. The Satellite Operations Control Center is located in Suitland, Maryland. Major command stations for satellite control are located near Fairbanks, Alaska and on Wallops Island, Virginia; a backup station for connection when the satellite is unavailable from the main stations is located at Point Barrow, Alaska.

== Instruments ==
Primary sensors included the Advanced Very High Resolution Radiometer (AVHRR/2) for global cloud cover observations, and the TIROS Operational Vertical Sounder (TOVS) suite for atmospheric temperature and water profiling. Secondary experiments consisted of a Space Environment Monitor (SEM) measuring proton and electron fluxes, and the Data Collection and Platform Location System (DCPLS) for relaying data from balloons and ocean buoys for the Argos system. The TOVS suite consists of two subsystems: the High Resolution Infrared Radiation Sounder 2 (HIRS/2), and the Microwave Sounding Unit (MSU).

=== Advanced Very High Resolution Radiometer (AVHRR/2) ===
The NOAA-12 Advanced Very High Resolution Radiometer (AVHRR/2) was a five-channel scanning radiometer capable of providing global daytime and nighttime sea-surface temperature and information about ice, snow, and clouds. These data were obtained on a daily basis for use in weather analysis and forecasting. The multispectral radiometer operated in the scanning mode and measured emitted and reflected radiation in the following spectral intervals: channel 1 (visible), 0.55 to 0.90 micrometer (μm); channel 2 (near infrared), 0.725 μm to detector cutoff around 1.1 μm; channel 3 (IR window), 3.55 to 3.93 μm; channel 4 (IR window), 10.3 to 11.3 μm, and channel 5 (IR window), 11.5 to 12.5 μm.. All five channels had a spatial resolution of 1.1 km, and the two IR-window channels had a thermal resolution of 0.12 Kelvin at 300 Kelvin. The AVHRR was capable of operating in both real-time or recorded modes. Real-time or direct readout data were transmitted to ground stations both at low (4 km) resolution via automatic picture transmission (APT) and at high (1 km) resolution via high-resolution picture transmission (HRPT). Data recorded on board were available for processing in the NOAA central computer facility. They included global area coverage (GAC) data, with a resolution of 4 km, and local area coverage (LAC), that contained data from selected portions of each orbit with a 1-km resolution. Identical experiments were flown on other spacecraft in the TIROS-N/NOAA series.

=== TIROS Operational Vertical Sounder (TOVS) ===
The TIROS Operational Vertical Sounder (TOVS) consisted of two instruments: the High-resolution Infrared Radiation Sounder modification 2 (HIRS/2), and the Microwave Sounding Unit (MSU). Both two instruments were designed to determine radiances needed to calculate temperature and humidity profiles of the atmosphere from the surface to the stratosphere (approximately 1 mb). The HIRS/2 instrument had 20 channels in the following spectral intervals: channels 1 through 5, the 15-micrometer (μm) CO_{2} bands (15.0, 14.7, 14.5, 14.2, and 14.0 μm); channels 6 and 7, the 13.7- and 13.4-μm CO_{2}/H_{2}O bands; channel 8, the 11.1-μm window region; channel 9, the 9.7-μm ozone band; channels 10, 11, and 12, the 6-μm water vapor bands (8.3, 7.3, and 6.7 μm); channels 13 and 14, the 4.57-μm and 4.52-μm N_{2}O bands; channels 15 and 16, the 4.46-μm and 4.40-μm CO_{2}/N_{2}O bands; channel 17, the 4.24-μm CO_{2} band; channels 18 and 19, the 4.0-μm and 3.7-μm window bands; and channel 20, the 0.70-μm visible region. Resolution for all channels is 17.4 km at nadir. The HIRS/2 instrument provides data for calculations of temperature profiles from the surface to 10 mb, water vapor content at three levels of the atmosphere. The second instrument, the MSU, has four channels operating in the 50- to 60-GHz oxygen band (50.31, 53.73, 54.96 and 57.95 GHz) to obtain temperature profiles which are free of cloud interference. The same experiments are flown on other spacecraft in the TIROS-N/NOAA series. The NOAA-12 does not carry the SSU (Stratospheric Sounding Unit) instrument as on the NOAA-9 and NOAA-11 TOVS.

=== Data Collection System (DCS-Argos) ===
The Data Collection System (DCS) on NOAA-12, also known as Argos, was designed and built in France by the (CNES) to meet the meteorological data needs of the United States. The system receives low-duty-cycle transmissions of meteorological observations from free-floating balloons, ocean buoys, other satellites, and fixed ground-based sensor platforms distributed around the globe. The DCS is able to determine platform location using an inverse Doppler technique and is able to acquire data from any place in the world, particularly in the Polar regions of Earth. These observations are organized on board the spacecraft and retransmitted when the spacecraft comes within range of a command and data acquisition (CDA) station. The Argos data is separated from other spacecraft telemetry and relayed to the CNES processing center in Toulouse, France for processing and relay to users. The system operates in 3 bands: 137.77 MHz, 136.77 MHz, and 401.65 MHz. Identical systems are flown on other spacecraft in the TIROS-N/NOAA series. Downlinked to Russian and United States receiving stations.

=== Space Environment Monitor (SEM) ===
The Space Environmental Monitor (SEM) was an extension of the solar proton monitoring experiment flown on the ITOS spacecraft series. The object was to measure proton flux, electron flux density, and energy spectrum in the upper atmosphere. The experiment package consisted of three detector systems and a data processing unit. The Medium Energy Proton and Electron Detector (MEPED) measured protons in five energy ranges from 30 keV to >2.5 MeV; electrons above 30, 100, and 300 keV; protons and electrons (inseparable) above 6 MeV; and omni-directional protons above 16, 36, and 80 MeV. The High-Energy Proton Alpha Telescope (HEPAT), which had a 48° viewing cone, viewed in the anti-Earth direction and measured protons in four energy ranges above 370 MeV and alpha particles in two energy ranges above 850 MeV/nucleon. The Total Energy Detector (TED) measured electrons and protons between 300 eV and 20 keV.

== Science objectives ==
- Day and night observation of global cloud cover.
- Observation of atmospheric water/temperature profile.
- Monitoring particle flux in the near-Earth environment.

== Mission ==
The last contact occurred on 10 August 2007.
