= OPS 5114 =

American navigation satellite used for GPS

- Names: Navstar 4 GPS I-4; GPS SVN-4
- Mission type: Navigation; Technology
- Operator: U.S. Air Force
- COSPAR ID: 1978-112A
- SATCAT no.: 11141
- Mission duration: 5 years (planned); 10.75 years (achieved)

Spacecraft properties
- Spacecraft: Navstar
- Spacecraft type: GPS Block I
- Manufacturer: Rockwell Space Systems
- Launch mass: 758 kg (1,671 lb)
- Dimensions: 5.3 meters of long
- Power: 400 watts

Start of mission
- Launch date: 11 December 1978, 03:59 UTC
- Rocket: Atlas F / SGS-1 (Atlas-39F)
- Launch site: Vandenberg, SLC-3E
- Contractor: Convair; General Dynamics
- Entered service: 8 January 1979

End of mission
- Deactivated: 14 October 1989

Orbital parameters
- Reference system: Geocentric orbit
- Regime: Medium Earth orbit (Semi-synchronous)
- Perigee altitude: 20,163 km (12,529 mi)
- Apogee altitude: 20,201 km (12,552 mi)
- Inclination: 63.2°
- Period: 717.96 minutes

OPS 5114, also known as Navstar 4, GPS I-4 and GPS SVN-4, was an American navigation satellite launched in 1978 as part of the Global Positioning System development programme. It was the fourth of eleven Block I GPS satellites to be launched.

== Background ==
Global Positioning System (GPS) was developed by the U.S. Department of Defense to provide all-weather round-the-clock navigation capabilities for military ground, sea, and air forces. Since its implementation, GPS has also become an integral asset in numerous civilian applications and industries around the globe, including recreational used (e.g., boating, aircraft, hiking), corporate vehicle fleet tracking, and surveying. GPS employs 24 spacecraft in 20,200 km circular orbits inclined at 55°. These vehicles are placed in 6 orbit planes with four operational satellites in each plane.

== Spacecraft ==
The first eleven spacecraft (GPS Block 1) were used to demonstrate the feasibility of the GPS system. They were 3-axis stabilized, nadir pointing using reaction wheels. Dual solar arrays supplied over 400 watts. They had S-band communications for control and telemetry and Ultra high frequency (UHF) cross-link between spacecraft. They were manufactured by Rockwell Space Systems, were 5.3 meters across with solar panels deployed, and had a design life expectancy of 5 years. Unlike the later operational satellites, GPS Block 1 spacecraft were inclined at 63°.

== Launch ==
OPS 5114 was launched at 03:59 UTC on 11 December 1978, atop an Atlas F launch vehicle with an SGS-1 upper stage. The Atlas used had the serial number 39F, and was originally built as an Atlas F. The launch took place from Space Launch Complex 3E at Vandenberg Air Force Base.

== Mission ==
OPS 5114 was placed into a transfer orbit. The satellite raised itself into medium Earth orbit using a Star-27 apogee motor.

By 8 January 1979, OPS 5114 was in an orbit with a perigee of 20,163 km (12,529 mi), an apogee of 20,201 km (12,552 mi), a period of 717.96 minutes, and 63.20° of inclination to the equator. The satellite had a design life of 5 years and a mass of 758 kg (1,671 lb). It broadcast the PRN 08 signal in the GPS demonstration constellation, and was retired from service on 14 October 1989. On 20 February 1990, it was reactivated for further testing, before being deactivated again in May 1990.

== See also ==
- 1978 in spaceflight
