= Living Plume Shield (satellite) =

The Living Plume Shield or LIPS were a set of three satellites launched on Atlas rockets as secondary payloads, the primary payload consisting of NOSS Satellites.

- LIPS I, launched on 8 December 1980 on Atlas E/F serial number 68E, failed to reach orbit.
- LIPS II, launched on 9 February 1983 on Atlas H serial number 6001H, is still operating. It carries a UHF single-channel transponder.
- LIPS III, launched on 15 May 1987 on Atlas H serial number 6005H, is still operating. It weighs 138 pounds and has performed over 140 solar-cell experiments.

Each of the satellites was designed and tested in less than a year by the U.S. Naval Research Laboratory Spacecraft Engineering Department at their Payload Processing Facility in Washington, D.C.
As their name suggests, all three satellites were built by utilizing the plume shield that was used to deflect the exhaust of the upper-stage motor away from the primary payload and mounting experiments on the protected anterior surfaces.
