= OPS 5112 =

American navigation satellite used for GPS

- Names: Navstar 2 NDS-2; GPS I-2; GPS SVN-2
- Mission type: Navigation; Technology
- Operator: U.S. Air Force
- COSPAR ID: 1978-047A
- SATCAT no.: 10893
- Mission duration: 5 years (planned); 3 years (achieved)

Spacecraft properties
- Spacecraft: Navstar
- Spacecraft type: GPS Block I
- Manufacturer: Rockwell Space Systems
- Launch mass: 758 kg (1,671 lb)
- Dimensions: 5.3 meters of long
- Power: 400 watts

Start of mission
- Launch date: 13 May 1978, 10:34:00 UTC
- Rocket: Atlas F / SGS-1 (Atlas-49F)
- Launch site: Vandenberg, SLC-3E
- Contractor: Convair; General Dynamics
- Entered service: 14 July 1978

End of mission
- Deactivated: 16 July 1981

Orbital parameters
- Reference system: Geocentric orbit
- Regime: Medium Earth orbit (Semi-synchronous)
- Perigee altitude: 19,952 km (12,398 mi)
- Apogee altitude: 20,084 km (12,480 mi)
- Inclination: 63.10°
- Period: 711.30 minutes

OPS 5112, also known as Navstar 2, NDS-2, GPS I-2 and GPS SVN-2, was an American navigation satellite launched in 1978 as part of the Global Positioning System development programme. It was the second of eleven Block I GPS satellites to be launched.

== Background ==
Global Positioning System (GPS) was developed by the U.S. Department of Defense to provide all-weather round-the-clock navigation capabilities for military ground, sea, and air forces. Since its implementation, GPS has also become an integral asset in numerous civilian applications and industries around the globe, including recreational used (e.g., boating, aircraft, hiking), corporate vehicle fleet tracking, and surveying. GPS employs 24 spacecraft in 20,200 km circular orbits inclined at 55°. These vehicles are placed in 6 orbit planes with four operational satellites in each plane.

== Spacecraft ==
The first eleven spacecraft (GPS Block 1) were used to demonstrate the feasibility of the GPS system. They were 3-axis stabilized, nadir pointing using reaction wheels. Dual solar arrays supplied over 400 W. They had S-band (SGLS) communications for control and telemetry and UHF cross-link between spacecraft. They were manufactured by Rockwell Space Systems, were 5.3 m across with solar panels deployed, and had a design life expectancy of 5 years. Unlike the later operational satellites, GPS Block 1 spacecraft were inclined at 63°.

== Launch ==
OPS 5112 was launched at 10:34 UTC on 13 May 1978, atop an Atlas F launch vehicle with an SGS-1 upper stage. The Atlas used had the serial number 49F, and was originally built as an Atlas F. The launch took place from Vandenberg Space Launch Complex 3 (SLC-3E) at Vandenberg Air Force Base, and placed OPS 5112 into a transfer orbit. The satellite raised itself into medium Earth orbit using a Star-27 apogee motor.

== Mission ==
By 14 July 1978, OPS 5112 was in an orbit with a perigee of 19,952 km (12,398 mi), an apogee of 20,084 km (12,480 mi), a period of 711.30 minutes, and 63.10° of inclination to the equator. The satellite had a design life of 5 years and a mass of 758 kg (1,671 lb). It broadcast the PRN 07 signal in the GPS demonstration constellation, and was retired from service on 16 July 1981.
