= OPS 9794 =

American navigation satellite used for GPS

- Names: Navstar 8 GPS I-8; GPS SVN-8
- Mission type: Navigation; Technology
- Operator: U.S. Air Force
- COSPAR ID: 1983-072A
- SATCAT no.: 14189
- Mission duration: 5 years (planned); 9.75 years (achieved)

Spacecraft properties
- Spacecraft: Navstar
- Spacecraft type: GPS Block I
- Manufacturer: Rockwell Space Systems
- Launch mass: 758 kg (1,671 lb)
- Dimensions: 5.3 meters long
- Power: 400 watts

Start of mission
- Launch date: 14 July 1983, 10:21:00 UTC
- Rocket: Atlas E / SGS-2 (Atlas-75E)
- Launch site: Vandenberg, SLC-3W
- Entered service: 10 August 1983

End of mission
- Deactivated: 4 May 1993

Orbital parameters
- Reference system: Geocentric orbit
- Regime: Medium Earth orbit (Semi-synchronous)
- Perigee altitude: 19,917 km (12,376 mi)
- Apogee altitude: 20,446 km (12,705 mi)
- Inclination: 62.80°
- Period: 718.00 minutes

OPS 9794, also known as Navstar 8, GPS I-8 and GPS SVN-8, was an American navigation satellite launched in 1983 as part of the Global Positioning System development program. It was the eighth of eleven Block I GPS satellites to be launched.

== Background ==
Global Positioning System (GPS) was developed by the U.S. Department of Defense to provide all-weather round-the-clock navigation capabilities for military ground, sea, and air forces. Since its implementation, GPS has also become an integral asset in numerous civilian applications and industries around the globe, including recreational used (e.g., boating, aircraft, hiking), corporate vehicle fleet tracking, and surveying. GPS employs 24 spacecraft in 20,200 km circular orbits inclined at 55°. These vehicles are placed in 6 orbit planes with four operational satellites in each plane.

== Spacecraft ==
The first eleven spacecraft (GPS Block 1) were used to demonstrate the feasibility of the GPS system. They were 3-axis stabilized, nadir pointing using reaction wheels. Dual solar arrays supplied over 400 watts. They had S-band communications for control and telemetry and Ultra high frequency (UHF) cross-link between spacecraft. They were manufactured by Rockwell Space Systems, were 5.3 meters across with solar panels deployed, and had a design life expectancy of 5 years. Unlike the later operational satellites, GPS Block 1 spacecraft were inclined at 63°.

== Launch ==
OPS 9794 was launched at 10:21 UTC on 14 July 1983, atop an Atlas E launch vehicle with an SGS-2 upper stage. The Atlas used had the serial number 75E, and was originally built as an Atlas E. The launch took place from Space Launch Complex 3W at Vandenberg Air Force Base, and placed OPS 9794 into a transfer orbit. The satellite raised itself into medium Earth orbit using a Star-27 apogee motor.

== Mission ==
By 10 August 1983, OPS 9794 had been raised to an orbit with a perigee of 19,917 km (12,376 mi), an apogee of 20,446 km (12,705 mi), a period of 718.00 minutes, and 62.80° of inclination to the equator. The satellite had a design life of 5 years and a mass of 758 kg (1,671 lb). It broadcast the PRN 11 signal in the GPS demonstration constellation, and was retired from service on 4 May 1993.
