= USA-5 =

American navigation satellite used for GPS

- Names: Navstar 10; GPS I-10; GPS SVN-10
- Mission type: Navigation; Technology
- Operator: U.S. Air Force
- COSPAR ID: 1984-097A
- SATCAT no.: 15271
- Mission duration: 5 years (planned); 11 years (achieved)

Spacecraft properties
- Spacecraft: Navstar
- Spacecraft type: GPS Block I
- Manufacturer: Rockwell Space Systems
- Launch mass: 758 kg (1,671 lb)
- Dimensions: 5.3 meters of long
- Power: 400 watts

Start of mission
- Launch date: 8 September 1984, 21:41:00 UTC
- Rocket: Atlas E / SGS-2 (Atlas-14E)
- Launch site: Vandenberg, SLC-3W
- Contractor: Convair; General Dynamics
- Entered service: 3 October 1984

End of mission
- Deactivated: 18 November 1995

Orbital parameters
- Reference system: Geocentric orbit
- Regime: Medium Earth orbit (Semi-synchronous)
- Perigee altitude: 19,962 km (12,404 mi)
- Apogee altitude: 20,403 km (12,678 mi)
- Inclination: 63.20°
- Period: 718.00 minutes

USA-5, also known as Navstar 10, GPS I-10 and GPS SVN-10, was an American navigation satellite launched in 1984 as part of the Global Positioning System (GPS) development programme. It was the tenth of eleven Block I GPS satellites to be launched.

== Background ==
Global Positioning System (GPS) was developed by the U.S. Department of Defense (DoD) to provide all-weather round-the-clock navigation capabilities for military ground, sea, and air forces. Since its implementation, GPS has also become an integral asset in numerous civilian applications and industries around the globe, including recreational used (e.g., boating, aircraft, hiking), corporate vehicle fleet tracking, and surveying. GPS employs 24 spacecraft in 20,200 km circular orbits inclined at 55°. These vehicles are placed in 6 orbit planes with four operational satellites in each plane.

== Spacecraft ==
The first eleven spacecraft (GPS Block 1) were used to demonstrate the feasibility of the GPS system. They were 3-axis stabilized, nadir pointing using reaction wheels. Dual solar arrays supplied over 400 watts. They had S-band communications for control and telemetry and Ultra high frequency (UHF) cross-link between spacecraft. They were manufactured by Rockwell Space Systems, were 5.3 meters across with solar panels deployed, and had a design life expectancy of 5 years. Unlike the later operational satellites, GPS Block 1 spacecraft were inclined at 63°.

== Launch ==
USA-5 was launched at 21:41:00 UTC on 8 September 1984, atop an Atlas E launch vehicle with an SGS-2 upper stage. The Atlas used had the serial number 14E, and was originally built as an Atlas E. The launch took place from Space Launch Complex 3W at Vandenberg Air Force Base, and placed USA-5 into a transfer orbit. The satellite raised itself into medium Earth orbit (MEO) using a Star-27 apogee motor.

== Mission ==
By 3 October 1984, USA-5 had been raised to an orbit with a perigee of 19,962 km (12,404 mi), an apogee of 20,403 km (12,678 mi), a period of 718.00 minutes, and 63.20° of inclination to the equator. The satellite had a design life of 5 years and a mass of 758 kg (1,671 lb). It broadcast the PRN 12 signal in the GPS demonstration constellation, and was retired from service on 18 November 1995. It was the last Block I satellite to be decommissioned.
