= NOAA-8 =

American weather satellite

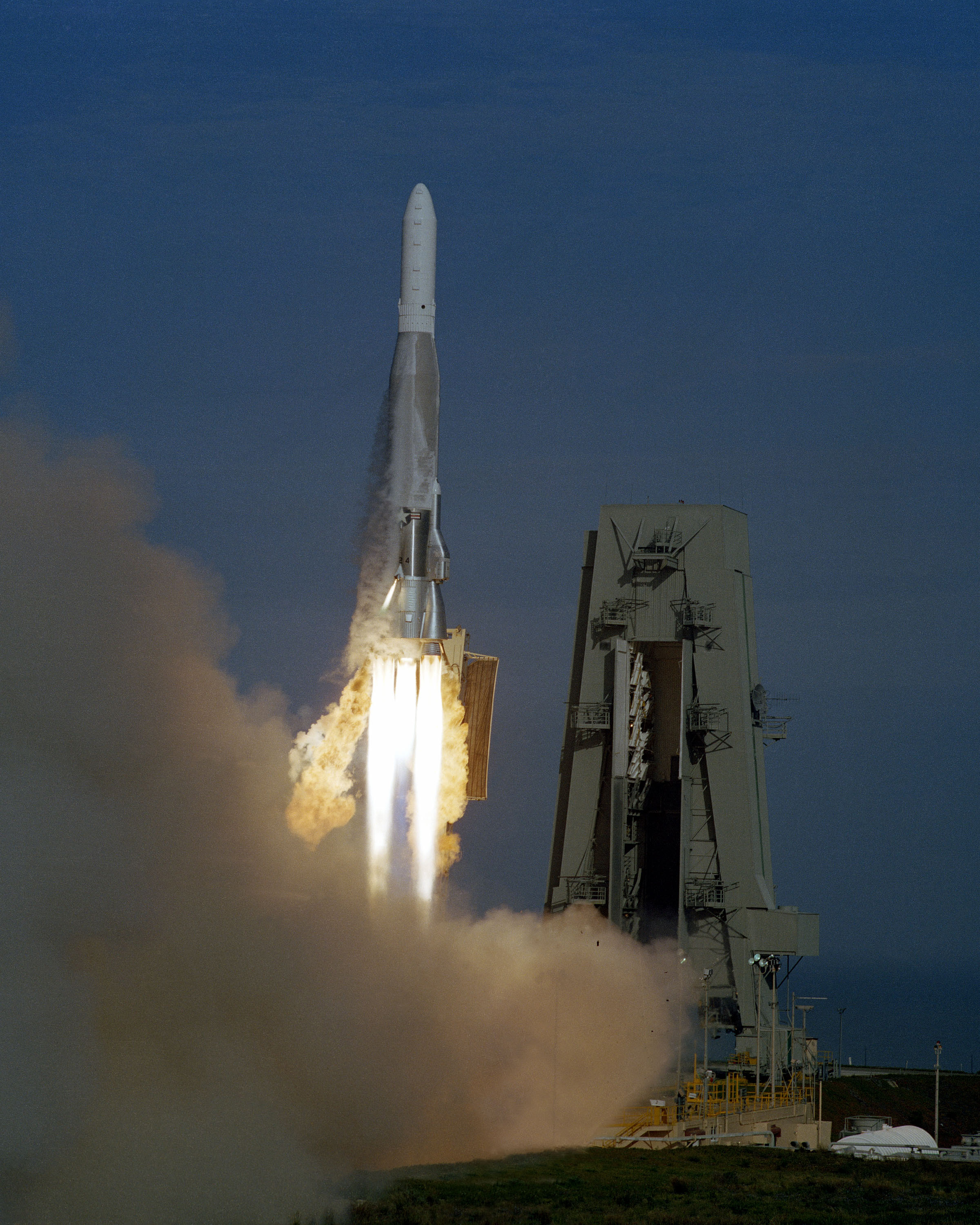
- Launch of NOAA-8
- Names: NOAA-E
- Mission type: Weather
- Operator: NOAA
- COSPAR ID: 1983-022A
- SATCAT no.: 13923
- Mission duration: 2 years (planned); 2.75 years (achieved)

Spacecraft properties
- Spacecraft type: TIROS
- Bus: Advanced Tiros-N
- Manufacturer: GE Aerospace
- Launch mass: 1,420 kg (3,130 lb)
- Dry mass: 740 kg (1,630 lb)

Start of mission
- Launch date: 28 March 1983, 15:52:00 UTC
- Rocket: Atlas-E Star-37S-ISS (Atlas S/N 73E)
- Launch site: Vandenberg, SLC-3W
- Contractor: Convair

End of mission
- Disposal: Decommissioned
- Last contact: 9 January 1986

Orbital parameters
- Reference system: Geocentric orbit
- Regime: Sun-synchronous orbit
- Perigee altitude: 806.0 km (500.8 mi)
- Apogee altitude: 829.0 km (515.1 mi)
- Inclination: 98.80°
- Period: 101.2 minutes
Instruments
- AVHRR/2: Advanced Very High Resolution Radiometer
- TOVS: TIROS Operational Vertical Sounder
- SEM: Space Environment Monitor
- DCPLS (Argos): Data Collection and Platform Location System
- SARSAT: Search and Rescue Satellite-Aided Tracking System

Hurricane Elena from NOAA 8 (1 September 1985)

Hurricane Elena from NOAA 8 (2 September 1985)

NOAA-8, known as NOAA-E before launch, was an American weather satellite operated by the National Oceanic and Atmospheric Administration (NOAA) for use in the National Environmental Satellite Data and Information Service (NESDIS). It was first of the Advanced TIROS-N series of satellites. The satellite design provided an economical and stable Sun-synchronous platform for advanced operational instruments to measure the atmosphere of Earth, its surface and cloud cover, and the near-space environment.

== Launch ==
NOAA-8 was launched on an Atlas E launch vehicle on 28 March 1983 from Vandenberg Air Force Base at Vandenberg Space Launch Complex 3 (SLW-3W).

== Spacecraft ==
The NOAA-8 satellite had a mass of 1,420 kg (3,130 lb). The satellite was based upon the DMSP Block 5D satellite bus developed for the U.S. Air Force, and it was capable of maintaining an Earth-pointing accuracy of better than ± 0.1° with a motion rate of less than 0.035 degrees/second.

== Instruments ==
Primary sensors included the Advanced Very High Resolution Radiometer (AVHRR/2) for global cloud cover observations, and the TIROS Operational Vertical Sounder (TOVS) suite for atmospheric temperature and water profiling. Secondary experiments consisted of a Space Environment Monitor (SEM) measuring proton and electron fluxes, and the Data Collection and Platform Location System (DCPLS) for relaying data from balloons and ocean buoys for the Argos system. A search and rescue satellite aided tracking (SARSAT) system was also included on NOAA-8. The TOVS suite consists of three subsystems: the High Resolution Infrared Radiation Sounder 2 (HIRS/2), the Stratospheric Sounding Unit (SSU), and the Microwave Sounding Unit (MSU).

=== Advanced Very High Resolution Radiometer (AVHRR/2) ===
The NOAA-8 Advanced Very High Resolution Radiometer (AVHRR/2) was a four-channel scanning radiometer capable of providing global daytime and nighttime sea-surface temperature and information about ice, snow, and clouds. These data were obtained on a daily basis for use in weather analysis and forecasting. The multispectral radiometer operated in the scanning mode and measured emitted and reflected radiation in the following spectral intervals: channel 1 (visible), 0.55 to 0.90 micrometer (μm); channel 2 (near infrared), 0.725 μm to detector cutoff around 1.1 μm; channel 3 (IR window), 3.55 to 3.93 μm; and channel 4 (IR window), 10.5 to 11.5 μm. All four channels had a spatial resolution of 1.1 km, and the two IR-window channels had a thermal resolution of 0.12 Kelvin at 300 Kelvin. The AVHRR was capable of operating in both real-time or recorded modes. Real-time or direct readout data were transmitted to ground stations both at low (4 km) resolution via automatic picture transmission (APT) and at high (1 km) resolution via high-resolution picture transmission (HRPT). Data recorded on board were available for processing in the NOAA central computer facility. They included global area coverage (GAC) data, with a resolution of 4 km, and local area coverage (LAC), that contained data from selected portions of each orbit with a 1-km resolution. Identical experiments were flown on other spacecraft in the TIROS-N/NOAA series.

=== TIROS Operational Vertical Sounder (TOVS) ===
The TIROS Operational Vertical Sounder (TOVS) consisted of three instruments: the High-resolution Infrared Radiation Sounder modification 2 (HIRS/2), the Stratospheric Sounding Unit (SSU), and the Microwave Sounding Unit (MSU). All three instruments were designed to determine radiances needed to calculate temperature and humidity profiles of the atmosphere from the surface to the stratosphere (approximately 1 mb). The HIRS/2 instrument had 20 channels in the following spectral intervals: channels 1 through 5, the 15-micrometer (μm) CO_{2} bands (15.0, 14.7, 14.5, 14.2, and 14.0 μm); channels 6 and 7, the 13.7- and 13.4-μm CO_{2}/H_{2}O bands; channel 8, the 11.1-μm window region; channel 9, the 9.7-μm ozone band; channels 10, 11, and 12, the 6-μm water vapor bands (8.3, 7.3, and 6.7 μm); channels 13 and 14, the 4.57- and 4.52-μm N_{2}O bands; channels 15 and 16, the 4.46- and 4.40-μm CO_{2}/N_{2}O bands; channel 17, the 4.24-μm CO_{2} band; channels 18 and 19, the 4.0- and 3.7-μm window bands; and channel 20, the 0.70-μm visible region. The SSU instrument was provided by the British Meteorological Office (United Kingdom). It was similar to the Pressure-Modulated Radiometer (PMR) flown on Nimbus 6. The SSU operated at three 15.0-μm channels using selective absorption, passing the incoming radiation through three pressure-modulated cells containing CO^{2}. The MSU instrument was similar to the Scanning Microwave Spectrometer (SCAMS) flown on Nimbus 6. The MSU had one channel in the 50.31-GHz window region and three channels in the 55-GHz oxygen band (53.73, 54.96, and 57.95 GHz) to obtain temperature profiles which were free of cloud interference. The HIRS/2 had a field of view (FOV) 30 km in diameter at nadir, whereas the MSU had a FOV of 110 km in diameter. The HIRS/2 sampled 56 FOVs in each scan line about 2250 km wide, and the MSU sampled 11 FOVs along the swath with the same width. Each SSU scan line had 8 FOVs with a width of 1500 km. This experiment was also flown on other TIROS-N/NOAA series spacecraft.

=== Data Collection and Platform Location System (DCPLS-Argos) ===
The Data Collection and Platform Location System (DCPLS) on NOAA-8, also known as Argos, was designed and built in France to meet the meteorological data needs of the United States and to support the Global Atmospheric Research Program (GARP). The system received low-duty-cycle transmissions of meteorological observations from free-floating balloons, ocean buoys, other satellites, and fixed ground-based sensor platforms distributed around the globe. These observations were organized on board the spacecraft and retransmitted when the spacecraft came within range of a Command and Data Acquisition (CDA) station. For free-moving balloons, the Doppler frequency shift of the transmitted signal was observed to calculate the location of the balloons. The DCPLS was expected, for a moving sensor platform, to have a location accuracy of 3 to 5 km, and a velocity accuracy of 1.0 to 1.6 m/s. This system had the capability of acquiring data from up to 4000 platforms per day. Identical experiments were flown on other spacecraft in the TIROS-N/NOAA series. Processing and dissemination of data were handled by CNES in Toulouse, France.

=== Space Environment Monitor (SEM) ===
The Space Environmental Monitor (SEM) was an extension of the solar proton monitoring experiment flown on the ITOS spacecraft series. The object was to measure proton flux, electron flux density, and energy spectrum in the upper atmosphere. The experiment package consisted of three detector systems and a data processing unit. The Medium Energy Proton and Electron Detector (MEPED) measured protons in five energy ranges from 30 keV to >2.5 MeV; electrons above 30, 100, and 300 keV; protons and electrons (inseparable) above 6 MeV; and omni-directional protons above 16, 36, and 80 MeV. The High-Energy Proton Alpha Telescope (HEPAT), which had a 48° viewing cone, viewed in the anti-Earth direction and measured protons in four energy ranges above 370 MeV and alpha particles in two energy ranges above 850 MeV/nucleon. The Total Energy Detector (TED) measured electrons and protons between 300 eV and 20 keV.

=== Search and Rescue Satellite Aided Tracking (SARSAT) ===
The Search and Rescue Satellite Aided Tracking (SARSAT) instruments had the capability of detecting and locating existing emergency transmitters in a manner independent of the environmental data. Data from the 121.5-MHz Emergency Locator Transmitters (ELT), the 243-MHz Emergency Position Indicating Radio Beacons (EPIRB), and experimental 406-MHz ELTs/EPIRBs were received by the Search and Rescue Repeater (SARR) and broadcast in real time on an L-band frequency (1544.5 MHz). Real-time data were monitored by local user terminals operated in the United States, Canada, and France. The 406-MHz data were also processed by the Search and Rescue Processor (SARP) and retransmitted in real time and stored on the spacecraft for later transmittal to the CDA stations in Alaska and Virginia, thus providing full global coverage. The distress signals were forwarded to Mission Control Centers located in each country for subsequent relay to the appropriate Rescue Coordination Center.

== Science objectives ==
- Day and night observation of global cloud cover.
- Observation of atmospheric water/temperature profile.
- Monitoring particle flux in the near-Earth environment.

== Mission ==
Although designed for a 2-year life span, NOAA 8 experienced a premature failure in June 1984, 9 months after its launch. This led to debris being released; some of this debris is large enough to track. As of 2023, NOAA 8 continues to orbit the Earth every 100 minutes at a height of about 800 km.

The last contact occurred on 9 January 1986, following a power failure caused by failure of its battery system caused by thermal runaway.
