= Atlas H =

Expendable launch vehicle

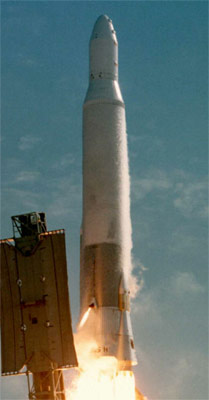
- Launch of the last Atlas H with NOSS-9.
- Function: Expendable launch system
- Manufacturer: Convair/General Dynamics
- Country of origin: United States

Launch history
- Status: Retired
- Launch sites: SLC-3E, Vandenberg
- Total launches: 5
- Success(es): 5
- First flight: 9 February 1983
- Last flight: 15 May 1987

Boosters
- No. boosters: 1
- Powered by: 2 LR-89-7
- Total thrust: 1,901.6 kN (427,500 lbf)
- Specific impulse: 293.4 s
- Burn time: 155 seconds
- Propellant: RP-1/LOX

First stage
- Powered by: 1 LR-105-7
- Maximum thrust: 386.4 kN (86,900 lbf); Atlas D
- Specific impulse: 316 s
- Burn time: 266 seconds
- Propellant: RP-1/LOX

The Atlas H was an American expendable launch system derived from the SM-65 Atlas missile. It was a member of the Atlas family of rockets, and was used to launch five clusters of NOSS satellites for the US National Reconnaissance Office. Two flights also carried LiPS satellites, as secondary payloads for the United States Naval Research Laboratory.

The Atlas H was a stage and a half rocket, using the enhanced Atlas rocket designed for use as the first stage of the Atlas G rocket, which differed from the Atlas H in having a Centaur upper stage. This stage was later reused as the first stage of the Atlas I. In practice, an MSD upper stage was flown on all five launches.

Atlas H could put a payload of 3,630 kg (8,000 lb) into low Earth orbit, or a payload of 2,255 kg (4,971 lb) into a geostationary transfer orbit.

== Launches ==
The Atlas H was launched five times from Vandenberg SLC3E:

Date	Mission	Mass (kg)	Apogee (km)	Perigee (km)	Inclination º
1983 February 9	NOSS 4 - PARCAE 5 / OPS 0252	700	1,186	1,063	63.40
1983 February 9	SSB - SSU	700	1,489	733	63.40
1983 February 9	SSD (NOSS 4) - NOSS-Subsat 4-4		1,419	796	63.40
1983 February 9	SSC - SSU		1,173	1,043	63.50
1983 February 9	SSA - SSU		1,166	1,051	63.40
1983 February 9	SSA (NOSS 4) - NOSS-Subsat 4-1 / OPS 0252 DEB		1,164	1,051	63.50
1983 February 9	LIPS 2		1,399	822	63.30
1983 June 9	NOSS 5 - PARCAE 6 / OPS 6432	700	1,167	1,049	63.40
1983 June 9	GB1 - SSU		1,167	1,049	63.40
1983 June 9	GB3 - SSU		1,166	1,049	63.40
1983 June 9	GB2 - SSU		1,167	1,049	63.40
1984 February 5	NOSS 6 - PARCAE 7 / OPS 8737	700	1,172	1,052	63.40
1984 February 5	JD1 - SSU		1,172	1,052	63.40
1984 February 5	JD2 - SSU		1,172	1,052	63.40
1984 February 5	JD3 - SSU		1,172	1,052	63.40
1986 February 9	USA 15 - PARCAE 8	700	1,166	1,049	63.00
1986 February 9	USA 18 - SSU		1,407	817	63.41
1986 February 9	USA 16 - SSU		1,161	1,055	63.00
1986 February 9	USA 17 - SSU		1,165	1,055	63.00
1987 May 15	USA 22 - PARCAE 9	700	1,179	1,045	62.90
1987 May 15	LIPS 3		1,316	899	63.40
1987 May 15	USA 25 - SSU		1,178	1,035	62.60
1987 May 15	USA 24 - SSU		1,184	1,046	63.20
1987 May 15	USA 23 - SSU		1,170	1,039	63.40
