= Vandenberg Space Launch Complex 3 =

Launch site at Vandenberg Space Force Base in California

Space Launch Complex 3
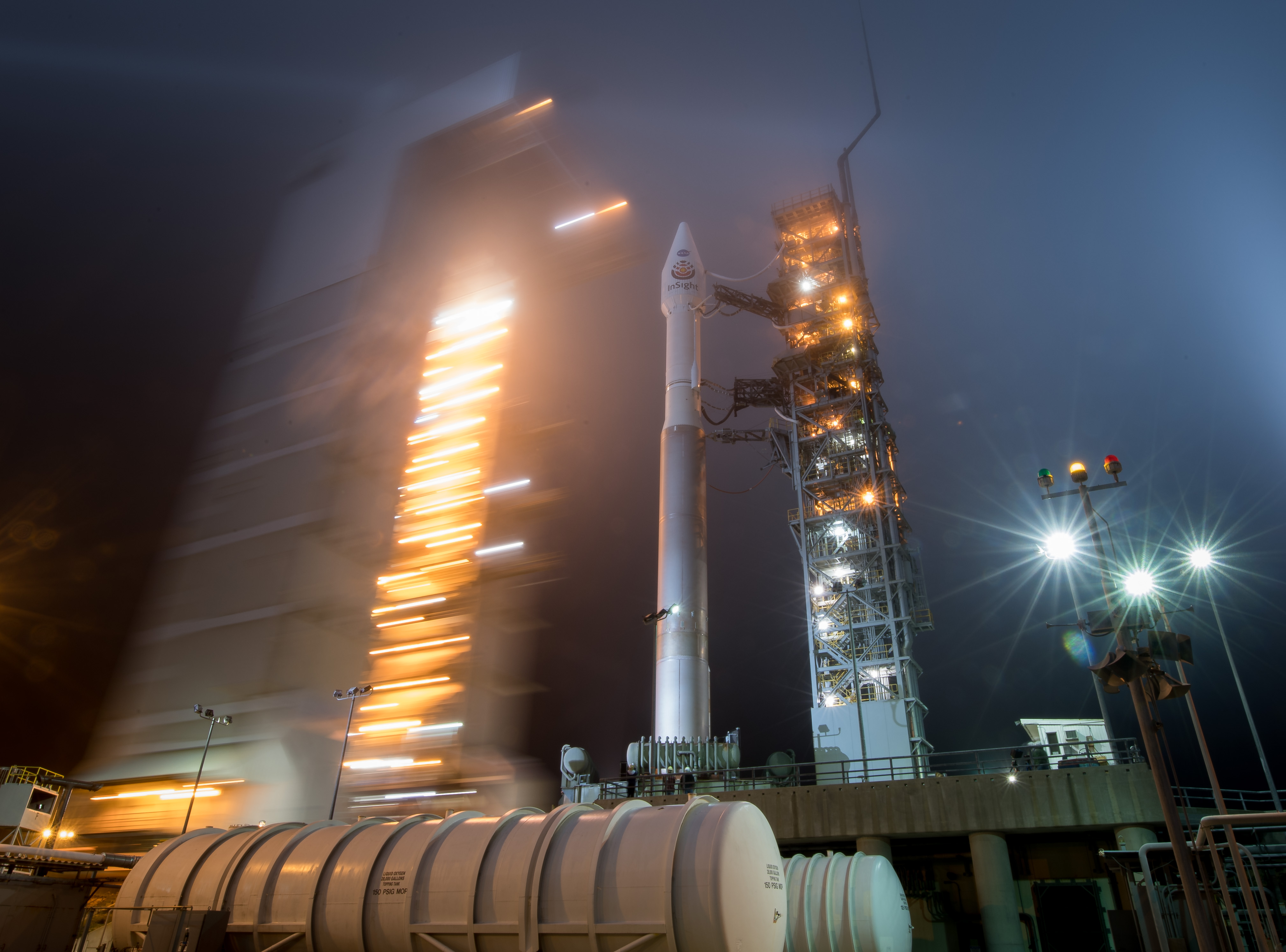
- The mobile launcher platform at SLC-3E rolls back prior to the launch of InSight in May 2018
- Interactive map of Space Launch Complex 3
- Launch site: Vandenberg Space Force Base
- Location: 34°38′35″N 120°35′19″W
- Time zone: UTC−08:00 (PST)
  - Summer (DST): UTC−07:00 (PDT)
- Short name: SLC-3
- Operator: United States Space Force (owner); United Launch Alliance (tenant)
- Total launches: 111
- Launch pad: 2
- Orbital inclination range: 51° – 145°
SLC-3W (PALC-1-1) launch history
- Status: Demolished
- Launches: 63
- First launch: October 11, 1960; Atlas-Agena / Samos 1
- Last launch: March 24, 1995; Atlas-E/F / USA-109
- Associated rockets: Retired: Atlas-Agena, Thor-Agena, Thorad-Agena, Atlas E/F; Plans cancelled: Falcon 1
SLC-3E (PALC-1-2) launch history
- Status: Awaiting rocket activation
- Launches: 48
- First launch: July 12, 1961; Atlas-Agena / Midas 3
- Last launch: November 10, 2022; Atlas V / JPSS-2 and LOFTID
- Associated rockets: Future: Vulcan Centaur; Retired: Atlas-Agena, Atlas SLV-3, Atlas-Burner, Atlas E/F, Atlas H, Atlas II, Atlas V

Launch sites at Vandenberg Space Force Base
Active pads
Active pads not used for launches
Inactive leased pads
Inactive unleased pads
1 SLC-1E
2 SLC-1W
3 SLC-2E
4 SLC-2W
5 SLC-10E
6 SLC-10W
7 LC-576E
8 SLC-9
9 SLC-3E
10 SLC-3W
11 SLC-4E
12 SLC-4W (LZ-4)
13 SLC-5
14 SLC-6
15 SLC-8
16 SLC-7
17 SLC-11
18 SLC-12
19 SLC-14
20 SLC-15

Space Launch Complex 3 (SLC-3) is a launch site at Vandenberg Space Force Base that consists of two separate launch pads. Space Launch Complex 3 East (SLC-3E) was used by the Atlas V launch vehicle before it was decommissioned in August 2021 with the final launch taking place on November 10, 2022, at 09:49, while Space Launch Complex 3 West (SLC-3W) has been demolished.

Launches from Vandenberg fly southward, allowing payloads to be placed in high-inclination orbits such as polar or Sun-synchronous orbit, which allow full global coverage on a regular basis and are often used for weather, Earth observation, and reconnaissance satellites. These orbits are difficult to reach from Cape Canaveral Space Force Station, where launches must fly eastward due to major population centers to both the north and south of Kennedy Space Center. Avoiding these would require hugely inefficient maneuvering, greatly reducing payload capacity.

SLC-3E was the launch site of the Mars lander InSight in May 2018.

== SLC-3E ==
One of two Atlas-Agena pads at VAFB, SLC-3E was originally the designated facility for MIDAS (Missile Defense Alarm System) launches and hosted its first flight on July 12, 1961. After the MIDAS program ended in 1966, SLC-3E then hosted reentry vehicle tests in 1967–68 as part of Project PRIME. The pad was mothballed for a decade, then returned to use in the late 1970s for NAVSTAR communications satellites on refurbished Atlas E/F missiles. On December 19, 1981, Atlas 76E crashed a few hundred feet from the pad after an engine failure, but no serious damage resulted to facilities. SLC-3E was then converted for the Atlas H (Atlas-Centaur core with a solid upper stage in place of the Centaur) and hosted ELINT satellite launches from 1983 to 1987. The pad was mothballed once again and not used for the next 12 years, when it was revived for the Atlas IIAS.

Three successful Atlas IIAS missions were flown from SLC-3E. The first mission, flown on December 18, 1999, launched the Terra satellite. The other two launched satellites in the Naval Ocean Surveillance System, USA 160 and USA 173. The final Atlas IIAS mission from SLC-3E was launched on December 2, 2003.

It was reported in 2003 that SLC-3E would be overhauled to serve as a launch platform for the Atlas V. Renovations of SLC-3E began after a January 2004 ground breaking ceremony. Along with other work, the Mobile Service Tower roof was raised by approximately 30 ft (9.1 m) to a height of 239 ft (73 m) to accommodate an Atlas V 500 series vehicle with its larger payload fairing. In July 2004, Lockheed Martin announced the arrival of the fourth and final segment of the fixed launch platform (FLP). The segments had been transported from a fabrication facility in Oak Hill, FL, 3,500 miles (5,600 km) away. The largest segment weighed 90 tons and was "thought to be the biggest over-the-road shipment ever attempted cross-country." In February 2005, the activation team handed over the launch pad to the operational team, marking the end of major reconstruction. The first Atlas V launch from SLC-3E took place at 10:02 GMT on March 13, 2008.

United Launch Alliance (ULA) inherited the pad in December 2006 when the company was formed as the joint venture of Lockheed Martin and Boeing, and continued to use it to fly Atlas V rockets. In October 2015 ULA announced that the pad would be updated to accommodate the upcoming Vulcan Centaur rocket, with the pad then being able to launch either Atlas V or Vulcan. The final Atlas V launch from the pad took place on November 10, 2022, carrying the JPSS-2 satellite. The first flight of Vulcan from SLC-3E was anticipated to be in 2023, but Vulcan has been delayed and the first flight from SLC-3E is now expected in 2025. As of December 2024 Conversion work to support Vulcan Centaur is ongoing and completion is expected in 2025.

== SLC-3W ==
SLC-3W was originally built for Atlas-Agena launches and the first flight off the pad was the launch of Samos 1 on October 11, 1960. The facility was extensively damaged 11 months later when Samos 3's booster exploded on the pad, but it was repaired quickly and hosted its next launch slightly under two months afterwards.

In 1962–63, the pad was converted for Thor-Agena use and was the primary launching site for Corona reconnaissance satellites for the next decade. After the Corona program ended in 1972, SLC-3W was converted back to support Atlases, this time flights of refurbished Atlas E/F missiles. The final such launch took place in 1995.

SpaceX initially planned to use SLC-3W for the Falcon 1 launch vehicle but switched to SLC-4E with Falcon 9.

== Launch statistics ==
=== SLC-3E ===
- Atlas-Agena
- Atlas SLV-3
- Atlas-Burner
- Atlas E/F
- Atlas H
- Atlas II
- Atlas V
- Vulcan

==== Early Atlas ====
All launches from 1961 to 1963 operated by the United States Navy. All launches since 1965 operated by the United States Air Force.

No.	Date	Time (UTC)	Launch vehicle	Configuration	Payload	Result	Remarks
1	12 July 1961	15:11	Atlas-Agena	Atlas LV-3 / Agena-A	MIDAS 3	Success	First launch from PALC-1-2.
2	21 October 1961	13:53	Atlas-Agena	Atlas LV-3 / Agena-B	MIDAS 4	Partial failure	Roll control failed 186 seconds following launch, placing satellite in an incorrect orbit.
3	22 December 1961	19:12	Atlas-Agena	Atlas LV-3 / Agena-B	Samos 5	Partial failure	Sustainer engine cutoff failed, leading to Atlas burn to continue until fuel depletion, placing satellite in higher than expected orbit.
4	7 March 1962	22:10	Atlas-Agena	Atlas LV-3 / Agena-B	Samos 6	Success	
5	9 April 1962	15:04	Atlas-Agena	Atlas LV-3 / Agena-B	MIDAS 5	Partial failure	Rocket underwent improper pitch program, placing payload in incorrect orbit.
6	17 December 1962	20:36	Atlas-Agena	Atlas LV-3 / Agena-B	MIDAS 6	Failure	Hydraulic heat shield failed at liftoff, leading to loss of booster engine hydraulic fluid. Range safety protocols engaged 80 seconds after launch.
7	9 May 1963	20:06	Atlas-Agena	Atlas LV-3 / Agena-B	MIDAS 7	Success	
8	12 June 1963	Unknown	Atlas-Agena	Atlas LV-3 / Agena-B	MIDAS 8	Success	
9	19 July 1963	03:51	Atlas-Agena	Atlas LV-3 / Agena-B	MIDAS 9	Success	
10	9 June 1966	20:15	Atlas-Agena	Atlas SLV-3 /Agena-D	MIDAS 10	Partial failure	First launch as SLC-3 and as SLC-3E. First Atlas SLV launch from the complex. Agena engine relight failed, placing satellite in incorrect orbit.
11	19 August 1966	19:30	Atlas-Agena	Atlas SLV-3 /Agena-D	MIDAS 11	Success	
12	5 October 1966	22:00	Atlas-Agena	Atlas SLV-3 /Agena-D	MIDAS 12	Success	
13	21 December 1966	22:15	Atlas SLV-3	Atlas SLV-3	PRIME	Success	Suborbital launch. First of three test flights of the X-23 PRIME.
14	5 March 1967	23:05	Atlas SLV-3	Atlas SLV-3	PRIME	Success	Suborbital launch. Second of three test flights of the X-23 PRIME.
15	20 April 1967	01:35	Atlas SLV-3	Atlas SLV-3	PRIME	Success	Suborbital launch. Third of three test flights of the X-23 PRIME.
16	16 August 1968	20:57	Atlas-Burner	Atlas SLV-3 /Burner 2	STP P68-1	Failure	Maiden flight of the Atlas-Burner and only flight from SLC-3E. Payload fairings failed to separate, leading to failure to reach orbit.
17	22 February 1978	23:44	Atlas E/F	Atlas E/F / SVS	OPS-5111 (GPS-1)	Success	First Atlas E/F flight from SLC-3E. First launch of the Global Positioning System.
18	13 May 1978	10:34	Atlas E/F	Atlas E/F / SVS	OPS-5112 (GPS-2)	Success	Part of the Global Positioning System.
19	7 October 1978	00:28	Atlas E/F	Atlas E/F / SVS	OPS-5113 (GPS-3)	Success	Part of the Global Positioning System.
20	11 December 1978	03:59	Atlas E/F	Atlas E/F / SVS	OPS-5114 (GPS-4)	Success	Part of the Global Positioning System.
21	9 February 1980	23:08	Atlas E/F	Atlas E/F / SVS	OPS-5117 (GPS-5)	Success	Part of the Global Positioning System.
22	26 April 1980	22:00	Atlas E/F	Atlas E/F / SVS	OPS-5118 (GPS-6)	Success	Part of the Global Positioning System.
23	19 December 1981	01:10	Atlas E/F	Atlas E/F / SVS	GPS-7	Failure	Part of the Global Positioning System. Sealant covering gas generator caused premature shutdown of a booster engine 7 seconds after launch, activating RSO protocols just before hitting the ground. Last Atlas E/F launch from SLC-3E.
24	9 February 1983	13:47	Atlas H	Atlas H / MSD	OPS-0252 (NOSS-5)	Success	Maiden flight of the Atlas H.
25	9 June 1983	23:23	Atlas H	Atlas H / MSD	OPS-6432 (NOSS-6)	Success	
26	5 February 1984	18:44	Atlas H	Atlas H / MSD	OPS-8737 (NOSS-7)	Success	
27	9 February 1986	10:06	Atlas H	Atlas H / MSD	USA-15 to USA-18 (NOSS-8)	Success	
28	15 May 1987	15:45	Atlas H	Atlas H / MSD	USA-22 to USA-25 (NOSS-9)	Success	Last flight of the Atlas H.

==== Atlas II and Atlas V ====
All Atlas II launches operated by Lockheed Martin. All Atlas V launches operated by United Launch Alliance.

No.	Date	Time (UTC)	Launch vehicle	Configuration	Payload	Result	Remarks
29	18 December 1999	18:57	Atlas II	Atlas IIAS	Terra	Success	Part of the Large Strategic Science Missions, aimed at studying Earth's climate. First civilian launch from SLC-3E, first Atlas II launch from Vandenberg, and first flight of a Centaur upper stage from Vandenberg.
30	8 September 2001	15:25	Atlas II	Atlas IIAS	NROL-13	Success	NRO launch. Two Intruder satellites, sharing the designation USA-160. First launch from SLC-3E acknowledged by the National Reconnaissance Office.
31	2 December 2003	10:04	Atlas II	Atlas IIAS	NROL-18	Success	NRO launch. Two Intruder satellites, sharing the designation USA-173. Last Atlas II flight from Vandenberg.
32	13 March 2008	10:02	Atlas V	Atlas V 411	NROL-28	Success	NRO launch. Trumpet satellite, also known as USA-200. First Atlas V flight from Vandenberg.
33	18 October 2009	16:12	Atlas V	Atlas V 401	USA-210 (DMSP 5D3-F18)	Success	
34	21 September 2010	04:03	Atlas V	Atlas V 501	NROL-41	Success	NRO launch. Topaz satellite, also known as USA-215. First launch of the Atlas V 500 configuration from SLC-3E.
35	15 April 2011	04:24	Atlas V	Atlas V 411	NROL-34	Success	NRO launch. Two Intruder satellites, sharing the designation USA-229.
36	13 September 2012	21:39	Atlas V	Atlas V 401	NROL-36	Success	NRO launch. Two Intruder satellites, sharing the designation USA-238.
37	11 February 2013	18:02	Atlas V	Atlas V 401	Landsat 8	Success	Part of the Landsat program, aimed at providing research-oriented photographs of Earth. First civilian Atlas V launch from Vandenberg.
38	6 December 2013	07:04	Atlas V	Atlas V 501	NROL-39	Success	NRO launch. Topaz satellite, also known as USA-247. Flight became notable for its patch featuring an octopus on a globe with the motto "Nothing is Beyond Our Reach," which generated controversy following the 2013 Global surveillance disclosures.
39	3 April 2014	14:46	Atlas V	Atlas V 401	USA-249 (DMSP-5D3 F19)	Success	Final launch of the Defense Meteorological Satellite Program.
40	13 August 2014	18:30	Atlas V	Atlas V 401	WorldView-3	Success	First commercial launch from SLC-3E.
41	13 December 2014	03:19	Atlas V	Atlas V 541	NROL-35	Success	NRO launch. Trumpet satellite, also known as USA-259.
42	8 October 2015	12:49	Atlas V	Atlas V 401	NROL-55	Success	NRO launch. Two Intruder satellites, sharing the designation USA-264.
43	11 November 2016	18:30	Atlas V	Atlas V 401	WorldView-4	Success	
44	1 March 2017	17:49	Atlas V	Atlas V 401	NROL-79	Success	NRO launch. Two Intruder satellites, sharing the designation USA-274.
45	24 September 2017	05:49	Atlas V	Atlas V 541	NROL-42	Success	NRO launch. Trumpet satellite, also known as USA-278. Last flight of the Atlas V 500 configuration from SLC-3E.
46	5 May 2018	11:05	Atlas V	Atlas V 401	InSight and Mars Cube One	Success	Part of the Discovery Program, aiming to study the interior of Mars. First interplanetary launch from Vandenberg, and first flight to another celestial body from SLC-3E.
47	27 September 2021	18:12	Atlas V	Atlas V 401	Landsat 9	Success	Part of the Landsat program, aimed at providing research-oriented photographs of Earth.
48	10 November 2022	09:49	Atlas V	Atlas V 401	NOAA-21 and LOFTID	Success	Part of the Joint Polar Satellite System for NOAA-21, aimed at providing environmental data used in numerical weather prediction. Inflatable heat shield test for LOFTID. Last flight of the Atlas V 400 configuration, and final Atlas launch from Vandenberg.

=== SLC-3W ===
- Atlas-Agena
- Thor-Agena
- Thorad-Agena
- Atlas E/F

==== Early Atlas and Thor ====
All launches from 1960 to 1962 operated by the United States Navy. All launches since 1966 operated by the United States Air Force.

No.	Date	Time (UTC)	Launch vehicle	Configuration	Payload	Result	Remarks
1	11 October 1960	20:33	Atlas-Agena	Atlas LV-3 / Agena-A	Samos 1	Failure	First launch from PALC-1 and first Atlas-Agena flight from Vandenberg. Improper umbilical disconnect during launch resulted in loss of Agena pressurization gas and failure to achieve orbit.
2	31 January 1961	20:21	Atlas-Agena	Atlas LV-3 / Agena-B	Samos 2	Success	First successful launch from PALC-1.
3	9 September 1961	19:28	Atlas-Agena	Atlas LV-3 / Agena-B	Samos 3	Failure	Improper umbilical disconnect led to loss of power in launch vehicle, causing it to fall and crash back onto pad.
4	22 November 1961	20:45	Atlas-Agena	Atlas LV-3 / Agena-B	Samos 4	Failure	Pitch control failed 244 seconds into flight. While Agena succeeded in staging, it was facing the wrong direction and failed to achieve orbit.
5	26 April 1962	18:56	Atlas-Agena	Atlas LV-3 / Agena-B	Samos 7	Success	
6	17 June 1962	18:14	Atlas-Agena	Atlas LV-3 / Agena-B	Samos 8	Success	
7	18 July 1962	20:15	Atlas-Agena	Atlas LV-3 / Agena-B	Samos 9	Success	
8	5 August 1962	17:59	Atlas-Agena	Atlas LV-3 / Agena-B	Samos 10	Success	
9	11 November 1962	20:17	Atlas-Agena	Atlas LV-3 / Agena-B	Samos 11	Success	
10	20 September 1966	21:14	Thor-Agena	TAT SLV-2A / Agena-D	OPS-1703 (KH-4A)	Success	First launch as SLC-3W. First Thor launch and only Thor-Agena launch from the pad.
11	1 May 1968	21:31	Thorad-Agena	Thorad SLV-2G / Agena-D	OPS-1419 (KH-4B)	Success	First Thorad-Agena launch from SLC-3W.
12	7 August 1968	21:36	Thorad-Agena	Thorad SLV-2G / Agena-D	OPS-5955 (KH-4B)	Success	
13	3 November 1968	21:30	Thorad-Agena	Thorad SLV-2G / Agena-D	OPS-1315 (KH-4B)	Success	
14	12 December 1968	22:22	Thorad-Agena	Thorad SLV-2G / Agena-D	OPS-4740 (KH-4A)	Success	
15	5 February 1969	21:59	Thorad-Agena	Thorad SLV-2G / Agena-D	OPS-3890 (KH-4B)	Success	
16	19 March 1969	21:38	Thorad-Agena	Thorad SLV-2G / Agena-D	OPS-3722 (KH-4A)	Success	Launch was a success, but satellite later failed.
17	2 May 1969	01:46	Thorad-Agena	Thorad SLV-2G / Agena-D	OPS-1101 (KH-4A)	Success	
18	24 July 1969	01:30	Thorad-Agena	Thorad SLV-2H / Agena-D	OPS-3654 (KH-4B)	Success	
19	22 September 1969	21:11	Thorad-Agena	Thorad SLV-2G / Agena-D	OPS-3531 (KH-4A)	Success	Last launch of the KH-4A.
20	4 December 1969	21:37	Thorad-Agena	Thorad SLV-2H / Agena-D	OPS-6617 (KH-4B)	Success	
21	4 March 1970	22:15	Thorad-Agena	Thorad SLV-2H / Agena-D	OPS-0440 (KH-4B)	Success	
22	20 May 1970	21:35	Thorad-Agena	Thorad SLV-2H / Agena-D	OPS-4720 (KH-4B)	Success	
23	23 July 1970	01:25	Thorad-Agena	Thorad SLV-2H / Agena-D	OPS-4324 (KH-4B)	Success	
24	18 November 1970	21:29	Thorad-Agena	Thorad SLV-2H / Agena-D	OPS-4992 (KH-4B)	Success	
25	17 February 1971	20:04	Thorad-Agena	Thorad SLV-2H / Agena-D	OPS-3297 (KH-4B)	Failure	Improper pre-launch procedure caused frozen lubricant to cause total turbopump failure 18 seconds after launch, leading to booster losing thrust and impacting the ground not far from the pad.
26	24 March 1971	21:05	Thorad-Agena	Thorad SLV-2H / Agena-D	OPS-5300 (KH-4B)	Success	
27	10 September 1971	21:33	Thorad-Agena	Thorad SLV-2H / Agena-D	OPS-5454 (KH-4B)	Success	
28	19 April 1972	21:43	Thorad-Agena	Thorad SLV-2H / Agena-D	OPS-5640 (KH-4B)	Success	
29	25 May 1972	18:41	Thorad-Agena	Thorad SLV-2H / Agena-D	OPS-6371 (KH-4B)	Success	Final flight of the Thorad-Agena, and last Thor launch from SLC-3W. Last flight of the CORONA program.

==== Atlas E/F ====
All launches operated by the United States Air Force.

No.	Date	Time (UTC)	Launch vehicle	Configuration	Payload	Result	Remarks
30	14 July 1974	05:17	Atlas E/F	Atlas E/F / PTS	NTS-1	Success	First Atlas E/F launch from SLC-3, and first Atlas launch from SLC-3W since 1962.
31	13 April 1975	00:51	Atlas E/F	Atlas E/F / Star-17A	P72-2	Failure	Explosion in flame trench damaged rocket during launch, leading to sustainer engine failure during ascent. Range safety protocols engaged 303 seconds into flight.
32	30 April 1976	19:12	Atlas E/F	Atlas E/F / MSD	OPS-6431 (NOSS-1)	Success	
33	23 June 1977	09:16	Atlas E/F	Atlas E/F / SGS-1	NTS-2	Success	
34	8 December 1977	17:45	Atlas E/F	Atlas E/F / MSD	OPS-8781 (NOSS-2)	Success	
35	27 June 1978	01:12	Atlas-Agena	Atlas E/F / Agena-D	Seasat	Success	Satellite designed to observe Earth's oceans through the use of remote sensing. First civilian launch from SLC-3 and SLC-3W. Final flight of the Atlas-Agena.
36	13 October 1978	11:23	Atlas E/F	Atlas E/F / Star-37S-ISS	TIROS-N	Success	Part of the TIROS-N series of weather satellites for NOAA.
37	24 February 1979	08:20	Atlas E/F	Atlas E/F / OIS	Solwind	Success	Satellite become notable for being destroyed during an anti-satellite test in 1985.
38	27 June 1979	15:51	Atlas E/F	Atlas E/F / Star-37S-ISS	NOAA-6	Success	Part of the TIROS-N series of weather satellites for NOAA. Launched as NOAA-A.
39	3 March 1980	09:27	Atlas E/F	Atlas E/F / MSD	OPS-7245 (NOSS-3)	Success	
40	29 May 1980	10:53	Atlas E/F	Atlas E/F / Star-37S-ISS	NOAA-B	Failure	Part of the TIROS-N series of weather satellites for NOAA. Loose seal resulted in flooded turbopump and lowered thrust. Sustainer engine compensated by burning longer, but upper stage engine ignited prior to staging, placing satellite in useless orbit.
41	9 December 1980	07:18	Atlas E/F	Atlas E/F / MSD	NOSS-4	Failure	Lubricant failure caused booster engine failure prior to jettison, flipping rocket 180° and breaking up.
42	23 June 1981	10:52	Atlas E/F	Atlas E/F / Star-37S-ISS	NOAA-7	Success	Part of the TIROS-N series of weather satellites for NOAA. Launched as NOAA-C.
43	21 December 1982	02:38	Atlas E/F	Atlas E/F / Star-37S-ISS	OPS-9845 (DMSP 5D-2/F6)	Success	
44	28 March 1983	15:52	Atlas E/F	Atlas E/F / Star-37S-ISS	NOAA-8	Success	Part of the Advanced TIROS-N series of weather satellites for NOAA. Launched as NOAA-E.
45	14 July 1983	10:21	Atlas E/F	Atlas E/F / SGS-2	OPS-9794 (GPS-8)	Success	Part of the Global Positioning System. First GPS launch from SLC-3W.
46	18 November 1983	06:32	Atlas E/F	Atlas E/F / Star-37S-ISS	OPS-1294 (DMSP 5D-2/F7)	Success	
47	13 June 1984	11:37	Atlas E/F	Atlas E/F / SGS-2	USA-1 (GPS-9)	Success	Part of the Global Positioning System. First satellite to receive a USA designation.
48	8 September 1984	21:41	Atlas E/F	Atlas E/F / SGS-2	USA-5 (GPS-10)	Success	Part of the Global Positioning System.
49	12 December 1984	10:42	Atlas E/F	Atlas E/F / SGS-2	NOAA-9	Success	Part of the Advanced TIROS-N series of weather satellites for NOAA. Launched as NOAA-F.
50	13 March 1985	02:00	Atlas E/F	Atlas E/F / OIS	Geosat	Success	
51	9 October 1985	02:53	Atlas E/F	Atlas E/F / SGS-2	USA-10 (GPS-11)	Success	Part of the Global Positioning System.
52	17 September 1986	15:52	Atlas E/F	Atlas E/F / Star-37S-ISS	NOAA-10	Success	Part of the Advanced TIROS-N series of weather satellites for NOAA. Launched as NOAA-G.
53	20 June 1987	02:34	Atlas E/F	Atlas E/F / Star-37S-ISS	USA-26 (DMSP 5D-2/F8)	Success	
54	3 February 1988	05:53	Atlas E/F	Atlas E/F / Star-37S-ISS	USA-29 (DMSP 5D-2/F9)	Success	
55	24 September 1988	10:02	Atlas E/F	Atlas E/F / Star-37S-ISS	NOAA-11	Success	Part of the Advanced TIROS-N series of weather satellites for NOAA. Launched as NOAA-H.
56	11 April 1990	15:00	Atlas E/F	Atlas E/F / Altair	USA-56 to USA-58 (Stacksat/P87-2)	Success	
57	1 December 1990	15:57	Atlas E/F	Atlas E/F / Star-37S-ISS	USA-68 (DMSP F-10)	Success	
58	14 May 1991	15:52	Atlas E/F	Atlas E/F / Star-37S-ISS	NOAA-12	Success	Part of the Advanced TIROS-N series of weather satellites for NOAA. Launched as NOAA-D.
59	28 November 1991	13:23	Atlas E/F	Atlas E/F / Star-37S-ISS	USA-73 (DMSP F-11)	Success	
60	9 August 1993	10:02	Atlas E/F	Atlas E/F / Star-37S-ISS	NOAA-13	Success	Part of the Advanced TIROS-N series of weather satellites for NOAA. Launched as NOAA-I.
61	29 August 1994	17:38	Atlas E/F	Atlas E/F / Star-37S-ISS	USA-106 (DMSP F-12)	Success	
62	30 December 1994	10:02	Atlas E/F	Atlas E/F / Star-37S-ISS	NOAA-14	Success	Part of the Advanced TIROS-N series of weather satellites for NOAA. Launched as NOAA-J.
63	24 March 1995	14:05	Atlas E/F	Atlas E/F / Star-37S-ISS	USA-109 (DMSP F-13)	Success	Last flight of the Atlas E/F. Most recent launch from SLC-3W.

== Gallery ==
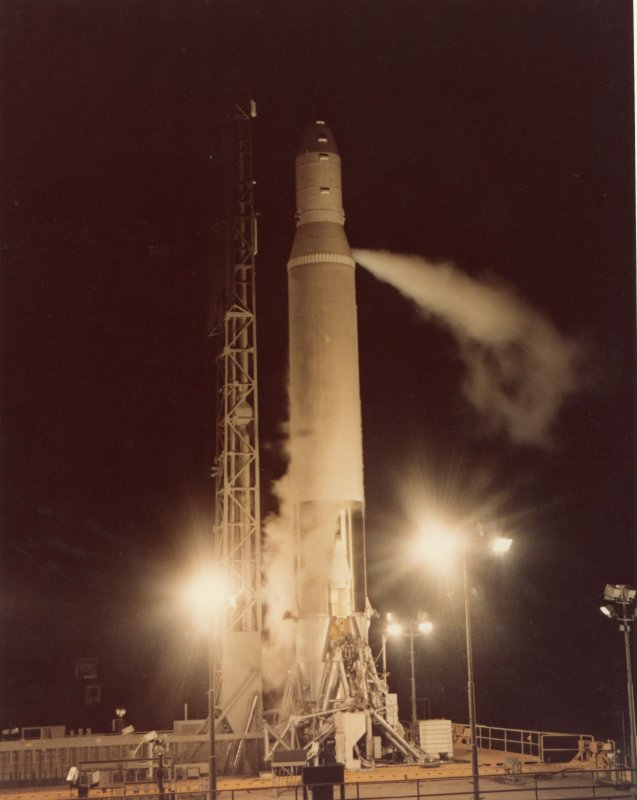
The first Atlas H launching from SLC-3E.

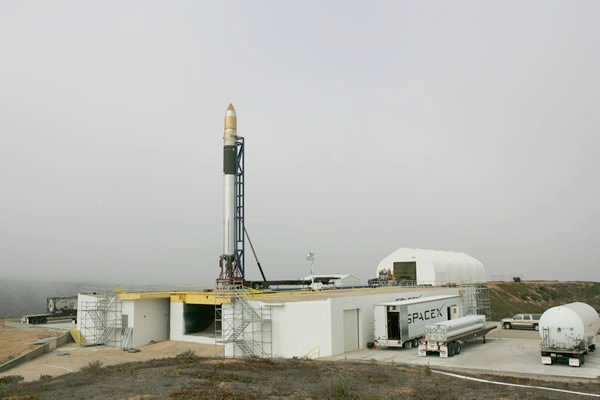
A Falcon 1 at SLC-3W.

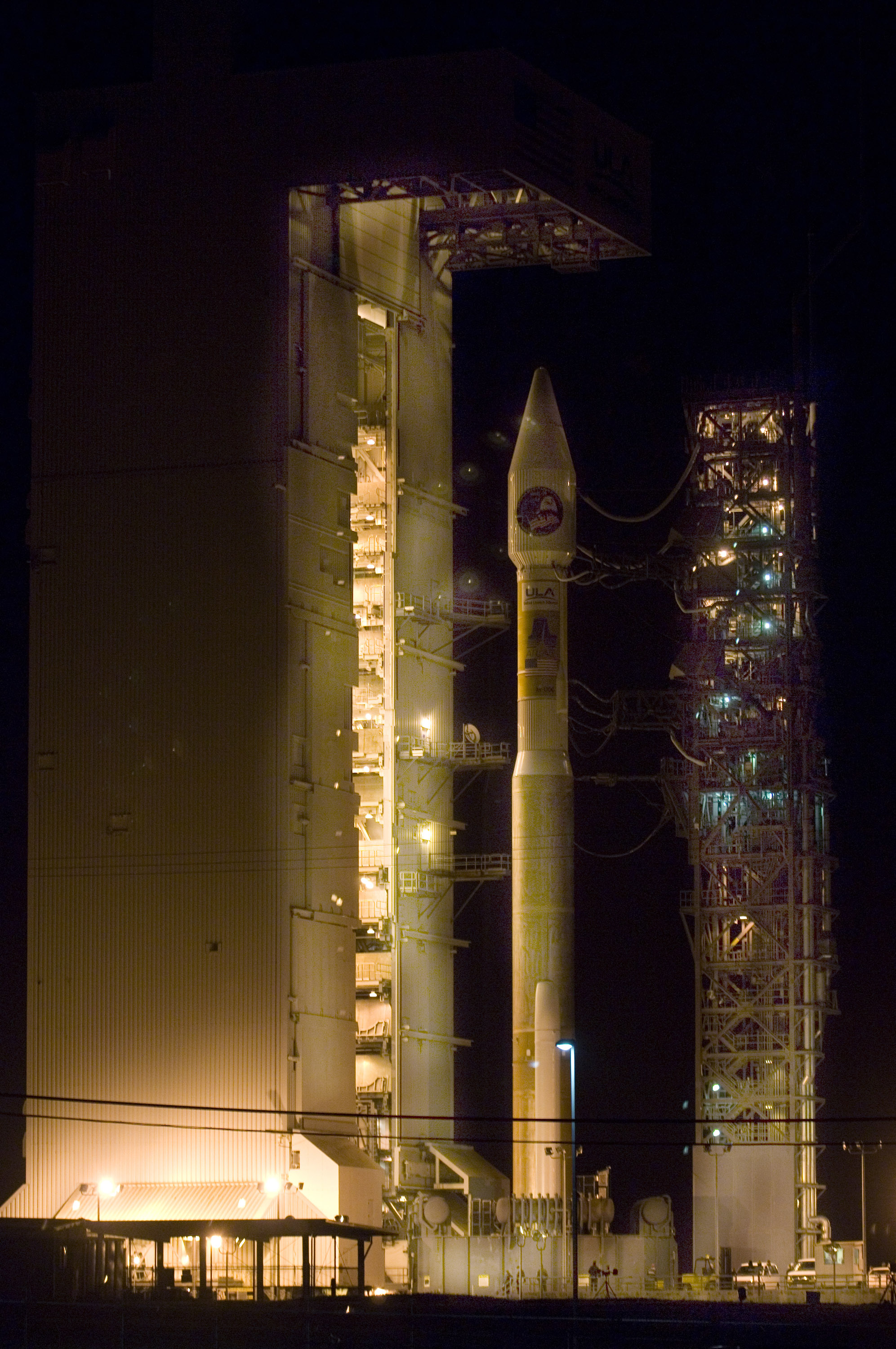
The first Atlas V to launch from Vandenberg at SLC-3E in 2008.

== See also ==
- Canyon Fire (2016) – 2016 wildfire in Southern California
- Vandenberg Space Launch Complex 2 – Rocket launch site at Vandenberg Space Force Base in the USA
- Vandenberg Space Launch Complex 4 – Rocket launch complex at Vandenberg Space Force Base in the United States
- Vandenberg Space Launch Complex 6 – Launch pad
