= GE Aerospace (1960s) =

Business group of General Electric

- Type: Division of General Electric
- Industry: Aerospace, military
- Founded: 1961
- Defunct: 1993
- Fate: Sold to Martin Marietta
- Number of employees: 37,500 (1991)

GE Aerospace was a business group of General Electric.

GE Aerospace made electronics and systems for the military and aerospace industries, like radar, secure communications equipment and military and commercial satellites. The majority of the group's business was in government and military applications.

== History ==
During the late 1960s, GE Aerospace personnel developed the first realtime image generator.

In 1991, the group had approximately 37,500 employees, most of whom were located in Florida and the New England and Middle Atlantic regions. The Philadelphia metropolitan area alone accounted for roughly 17,600 employees.

In 1993, the group was sold to Martin Marietta for over three billion dollars (U.S.), nearly doubling that company's revenue.

In 1995, Martin Marietta merged with Lockheed to form Lockheed Martin.

In 2010, the large Systems Integration ("The SI") division from GE Aerospace, with roots tracing back to the Apollo Program, was spun off to form The SI Organization Inc.

== See also ==
- Lockheed Martin Space Systems
- GE Aerospace
