= Nimbus 6 =

Former U.S. meteorological satellite

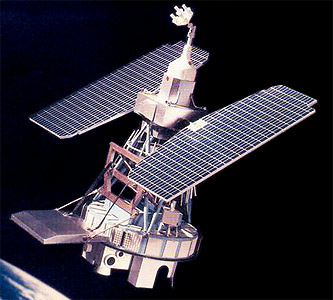
- Artist rendering of the Nimbus 6
- Names: Nimbus F
- Mission type: Weather satellite
- Operator: NASA
- COSPAR ID: 1975-052A
- SATCAT no.: 07924

Spacecraft properties
- Manufacturer: RCA Astrospace
- Launch mass: 827 kg (1,823 lb)
- Dry mass: 585 kg (1,290 lb)
- Dimensions: 3.04 m × 1.52 m × 3.96 m (10.0 ft × 5.0 ft × 13.0 ft)

Start of mission
- Launch date: 12 June 1975, 08:12:01 UTC
- Rocket: Delta 2910 (577/D93)
- Launch site: Vandenberg, SLC-2W
- Contractor: McDonnell Douglas

End of mission
- Last contact: 29 March 1983

Orbital parameters
- Reference system: Geocentric
- Regime: Low Earth orbit
- Perigee altitude: 1,093 kilometers (679 mi)
- Apogee altitude: 1,101 kilometers (684 mi)
- Inclination: 100,00°
- Period: 107,30 minutes

Nimbus 6 (also called Nimbus F) was a meteorological satellite. It was the sixth in a series of the Nimbus program.

== Launch ==
Nimbus 6 was launched on 12 June 1975, by a Delta rocket from Vandenberg Air Force Base in California, United States. The satellite orbited the Earth once every 107,30 minutes, at an inclination of 100,00°. Its perigee was 1,093 kilometers (679 mi) and its apogee was 1,101 km (684 mi).

== Instruments ==
- Earth Radiation Budget (ERB);
- Electrically Scanning Microwave Radiometer (ESMR);
- High-Resolution Infrared Radiation Sounder (HIRS);
- Limb Radiance Inversion Radiometer (LRIR);
- Pressure Modulated Radiometer (PMR);
- Scanning Microwave Spectrometer (SCAMS);
- Temperature-Humidity Infrared Radiometer (THIR);
- Tracking and Data Relay Experiment (T+DRE);
- Tropical Wind Energy Conversion and Reference Level Experiment (TWERLE).

== See also ==
- National Oceanic and Atmospheric Administration (NOAA)
