= Microwave humidity sounder =

The Microwave Humidity Sounder (MHS) is a five-channel passive microwave radiometer, with channels from 89 to 190 GHz. It is very similar in design to the AMSU-B instrument, but some channel frequencies have been altered. It is used to study profiles of atmospheric water vapor and provide improved input data to the cloud-clearing algorithms in the IR and MW sounder suites. Instruments were launched on NOAA's POES satellite series starting with NOAA-18 launched in May 2005 and the European Space Agency's MetOp series starting with MetOp-A launched in October 2006, continuing with MetOp-B launched in September 2012 and Metop-C launched in November 2018. The follow on instrument to MHS is MWS on the Metop-SGA satellites.

The Microwave Humidity Sounder was designed and developed by Astrium EU in Portsmouth, UK, under contract to EUMETSAT.

== Instrument characteristics ==
- Heritage: AMSU-B, HSB
- Swath: 1650 km
- Spatial resolution: 17 km horizontal at nadir
- Mass: 63 kg
- Duty cycle: 100%
- Power: 74 W (BOL)
- Data rate: 4.2 kbit/s
- Field of View: ± 49.5 degrees cross-track
- Instrument Instantaneous Field of View: 1.1 degrees circular

Table 1: Radiometric characteristics of the MHS

Channel Number
AMSU-B

Channel Number

Frequency
(GHz)
AMSU-B Frequency
(GHz)
Bandwidth
(MHz)
Instrument Sensitivity
NEDT (K)
Polarization
1
16
89.0
89.0 ± 0.9
2800
0.22
Vertical
2
17
157.0
150 ± 0.9
2800
0.34
Vertical
3
18
183.311 ± 1.00
183.31 ± 1.00
2 x 500
0.51
Horizontal
4
19
183.311 ± 3.00
183.31 ± 3.00
2 x 1000
0.40
Horizontal
5
20
190.311
183.31 ± 7.00
2200
0.46
Vertical
