= National Environmental Satellite, Data, and Information Service =

Operator of US environmental satellite programs

The National Environmental Satellite, Data, and Information Service (NESDIS) was created by the National Oceanic and Atmospheric Administration (NOAA) to operate and manage the United States environmental satellite programs, and manage the data gathered by the National Weather Service and other government agencies and departments.

== History ==
In August 1980, the National Earth Satellite Service (NESS) was removed from the Office of Oceanic and Atmospheric Services and became a principal agency line organization in NOAA with an Assistant Administrator who reported directly to the Administrator. This move reflected the increasing importance of satellite observations to NOAA's environmental science and service responsibilities. It was largely precipitated by a decision by the Carter Administration in November 1979 to assign NOAA management responsibility for all civil operational remote sensing from space. NESDIS was formed in 1982 with the merger of NESS and the Environmental Data Service.

NESDIS has managed operational polar orbiting satellites (POES) since 1966. Additionally, NESDIS has managed operational geosynchronous satellites (GOES) satellites since 1974. New generations of satellites are being developed to succeed the current polar orbiting and geosynchronous satellites: the Joint Polar Satellite System) and GOES-R. The first satellite in the GOES-R series launched on November 19, 2016. JPSS-1 successfully launched on November 18, 2017.

In 1979, NOAA's first polar-orbiting environmental satellite was launched. Current satellites owned and/or operated by NESDIS include NOAA-15, NOAA-18, NOAA-19, NOAA-20, NOAA-21, GOES-13/EWS-G1, GOES-14, GOES-15/EWS-G2 GOES-16, GOES-17, Jason-3, and DSCOVR. Since May 1998 NESIDS has operated the Defense Meteorological Satellite Program (DMSP) satellites on behalf of the United States Space Force.

== Organization ==
NESDIS's National Centers for Environmental Information (NCEI) archives data collected by the NOAA, U.S. Navy, U.S. Air Force, the Federal Aviation Administration, and meteorological services around the world. NCEI is the result of a merger of NOAA's National Climatic Data Center, National Coastal Data Development Center (NCDDC), National Oceanographic Data Center (NODC), and National Geophysical Data Center (NGDC).

NESDIS also runs many offices, including:

- Office of Space Weather Operations (SWO), formerly the Office Projects, Planning, and Analysis (OPPA) and Office of Systems Development (OSD)
- Office of Common Services (OCS), formerly the Office of Satellite Ground Systems (OSGS) and Office of Satellite Operations (OSO)
- Office of Satellite and Product Operations (OSPO), formerly the Office of Satellite Data Processing & Distribution (OSDPD)
- Center for Satellite Applications and Research (STAR), formerly the Office of Research & Applications
- Office of Low Earth Orbit Observations (LEO), formerly the Joint Polar Satellite System Program Office
- Office of Geostationary Earth Orbit Observations (GEO), formerly the GOES-R Program Office
- Systems Architecture and Engineering, formerly the Office of System Architecture and Advanced Planning (OSAAP)
- International & Interagency Affairs Office
- Office of Space Commerce
- Coral Reef Conservation Program (CRCP)
  - Coral Reef Watch (CRW)
  - Coral Reef Information System (CoRIS)

In 1960, TIROS-1, NASA's first owned and operated satellite, was launched. In 1983, NOAA assumed operational responsibility for the Landsat satellite system.
