= Advanced Technology Microwave Sounder =

The Advanced Technology Microwave Sounder (ATMS) is a 22-channel scanning microwave radiometer for observation of the Earth's atmosphere and surface. It is the successor to the Advanced Microwave Sounding Unit (AMSU) on NOAA weather satellites. ATMS units have been flown on the Suomi NPP and on the Joint Polar Satellite System.

== Applications ==
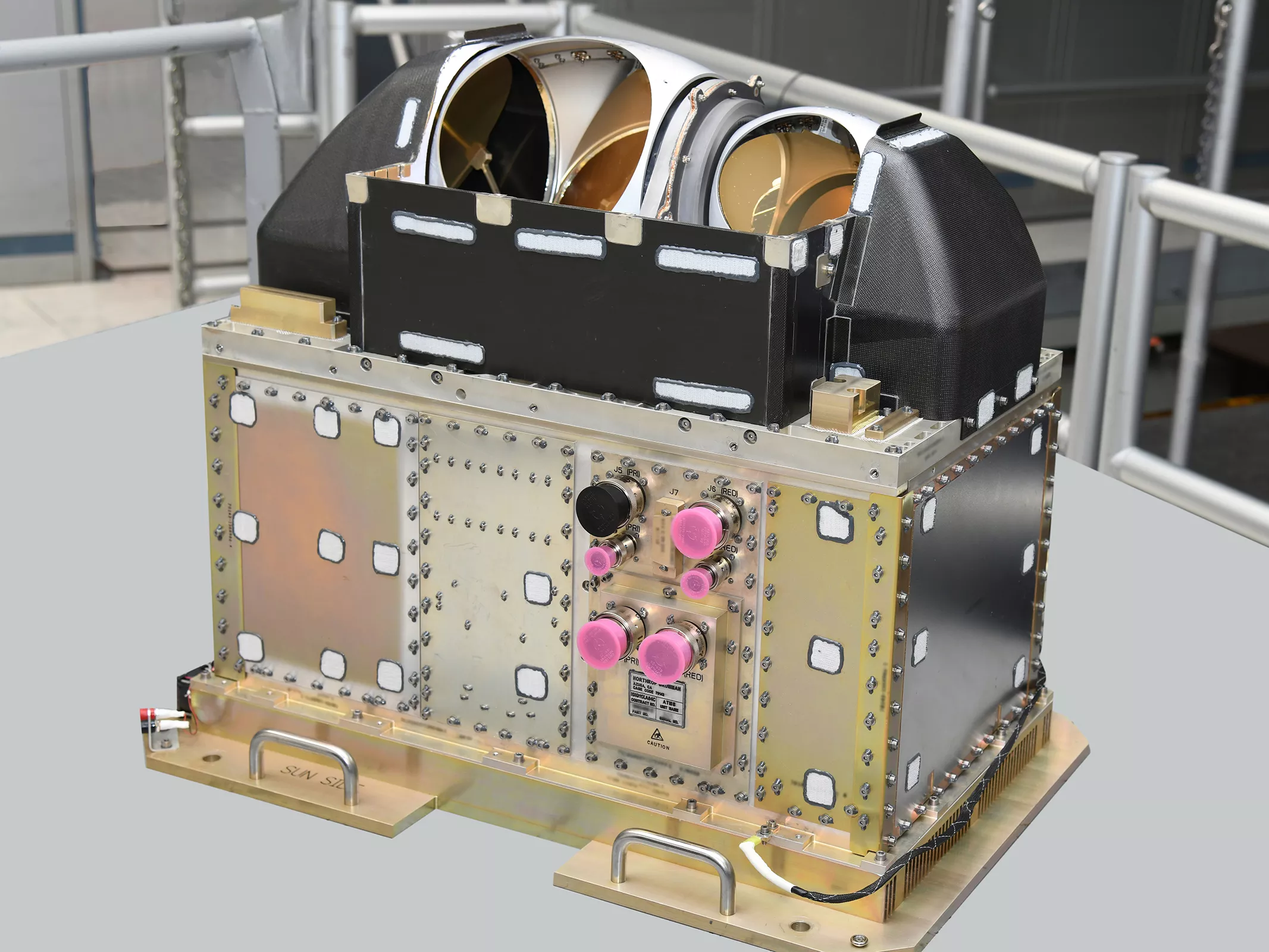
Advanced Technology Microwave Sounder

ATMS measurements are assimilated into numerical weather prediction models and atmospheric profiles retrieved by the combination of ATMS and the Cross-track Infrared Sounder on the same satellites are useful for synoptic scale meteorology. Also, ATMS continues the record from its predecessor instruments MSU and AMSU of measurements in the 5-mm band of oxygen for monitoring of atmospheric temperature trends.

== Instrument characteristics ==
All of the channels are contained within one unit, unlike the AMSU which comprises two instruments (AMSU-A and AMSU-B). The radiometer's antenna scans underneath the satellite through nadir, and its polarization vector rotates with the scan angle. The sampling rate satisfies the Nyquist criterion for channels 1-16; thus, images produced from the data are not aliased. However, ATMS images exhibit striping, attributed to receiver gain fluctuations (1/f noise), which can be removed by filtering the data. Table 1 lists some characteristics of the ATMS channels.

Table 1 ATMS Radiometric characteristics

| Channel Number | Passband Center Frequency (GHz) | Polarization near nadir | Number of Passbands | Radiometric Resolution NEDT (K) | Primary Function |
| 1 | 23.8 | vertical | 1 | 0.25 | Water Vapor Burden |
| 2 | 31.4 | vertical | 1 | 0.31 | Water Vapor Burden |
| 3 | 50.3 | horizontal | 1 | 0.37 | Surface Emissivity, Precipitation |
| 4 | 51.76 | horizontal | 1 | 0.28 | Tropospheric Temperature |
| 5 | 52.8 | horizontal | 1 | 0.28 | Tropospheric Temperature |
| 6 | 53.596 ± 0.115 | horizontal | 2 | 0.29 | Tropospheric Temperature |
| 7 | 54.4 | horizontal | 1 | 0.27 | Tropospheric Temperature |
| 8 | 54.94 | horizontal | 1 | 0.27 | Temperature Near Tropopause |
| 9 | 55.5 | horizontal | 1 | 0.29 | Temperature Near Tropopause |
| 10 | 57.290344 | horizontal | 1 | 0.43 | Stratospheric Temperature |
| 11 | 57.290344 ± 0.217 | horizontal | 2 | 0.56 | Stratospheric Temperature |
| 12 | 57.290344 ± 0.3222 ± 0.048 | horizontal | 4 | 0.59 | Stratospheric Temperature |
| 13 | 57.290344 ± 0.3222 ± 0.022 | horizontal | 4 | 0.86 | Stratospheric Temperature |
| 14 | 57.290344 ± 0.3222 ± 0.010 | horizontal | 4 | 1.23 | Stratospheric Temperature |
| 15 | 57.290344 ± 0.3222 ± 0.0045 | horizontal | 4 | 1.95 | Stratospheric Temperature |
| 16 | 88.2 | vertical | 1 | 0.29 | Clouds/Snow |
| 17 | 165.5 | horizontal | 1 | 0.46 | Water Vapor |
| 18 | 183.31 ± 7.0 | horizontal | 2 | 0.38 | Water Vapor |
| 19 | 183.31 ± 4.5 | horizontal | 2 | 0.46 | Water Vapor |
| 20 | 183.31 ± 3.0 | horizontal | 2 | 0.54 | Water Vapor |
| 21 | 183.31 ± 1.8 | horizontal | 2 | 0.59 | Water Vapor |
| 22 | 183.31 ± 1.0 | horizontal | 2 | 0.73 | Water Vapor |

Notes

- "Vertical polarization near nadir" (also known as quasi-vertical) means that for this cross-track scanning arrangement, the E-vector is parallel to the scan direction when the antenna views nadir; "horizontal polarization" means the orthogonal direction.
- The NEDT values were measured on the Suomi-NPP unit. Two subsequent units showed similar or slightly better noise performance.
