= MetOp =

Series of European meteorological satellites

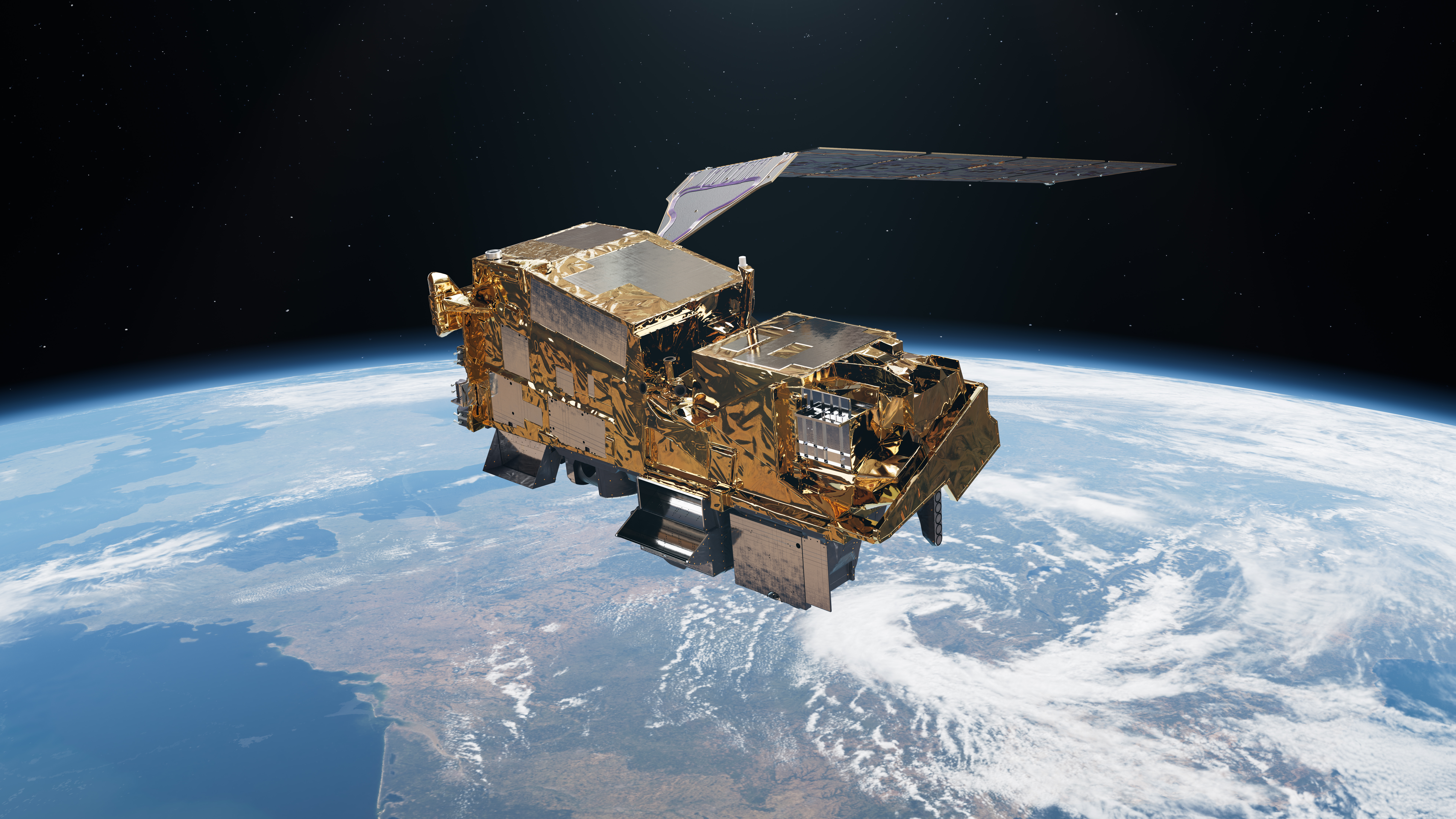
- Second generation A-type satellite
- Mission type: Meteorology / Climatology
- Operator: EUMETSAT
- COSPAR ID: MetOp-A: 2006-044A; MetOp-B: 2012-049A; MetOp-C: 2018-087A
- SATCAT no.: MetOp-A: 29499; MetOp-B: 38771; MetOp-C: 43689
- Website: EUMETSAT Metop; ESA MetOp

Spacecraft properties
- Spacecraft: MetOp
- Payload mass: 812 kg
- Dimensions: 6.2 x 3.4 x 3.4 metres (under the launcher fairing); 17.6 x 6.5 x 5.2 metres (deployed in orbit)

Start of mission
- Launch date: MetOp-A: 19 October 2006 at 16:28:00 UTC; MetOp-B: 17 September 2012 at 16:28:00 UTC; MetOp-C: 7 November 2018 at 00:47:27 UTC
- Rocket: Soyuz ST Fregat
- Launch site: Baikonur Cosmodrome (MetOp-A and MetOp-B), Guiana Space Centre (MetOp-C)

Orbital parameters
- Reference system: Sun-synchronous
- Altitude: 817 km
- Inclination: 98.7° to the equator
- Period: 101.0 minutes

MetOp (Meteorological Operational satellite) is a series of three polar-orbiting meteorological satellites developed by the European Space Agency (ESA) and operated by the European Organisation for the Exploitation of Meteorological Satellites (EUMETSAT). The satellites form the space segment component of the overall EUMETSAT Polar System (EPS), which in turn is the European half of the EUMETSAT / NOAA Initial Joint Polar System (IJPS). The satellites carry a payload comprising 11 scientific instruments and two which support Cospas-Sarsat Search and Rescue services. In order to provide data continuity between MetOp and NOAA Polar Operational Environmental Satellites (POES), several instruments are carried on both fleets of satellites.

MetOp-A, launched on 19 October 2006, was Europe's first polar orbiting satellite used for operational meteorology. With respect to its primary mission of providing data for Numerical Weather Prediction, studies have shown that MetOp-A data was measured as having the largest impact of any individual satellite platform on reducing 24-hour forecasting errors, and accounted for about 25% of the total impact on global forecast error reduction across all data sources. A 2023 report updated this estimate stating that the primary MetOp satellite has decreased in relative terms since 2011 from 24.5% to 11.15% in the FSOI metric.

Each of the three satellites were originally intended to be operated sequentially, however good performance of the MetOp-A and MetOp-B satellites mean there was a period of all three satellite operating. EUMETSAT lowered the orbit of MetOp-A and decommissioned the spacecraft in November 2021

The successor to the MetOp satellites is MetOp-SG. The first MetOp SG-A1 satellite was launched on 13 August 2025 2:37 CEST (12 August 21:37 local time) from Guiana Space Centre.

== Instruments ==
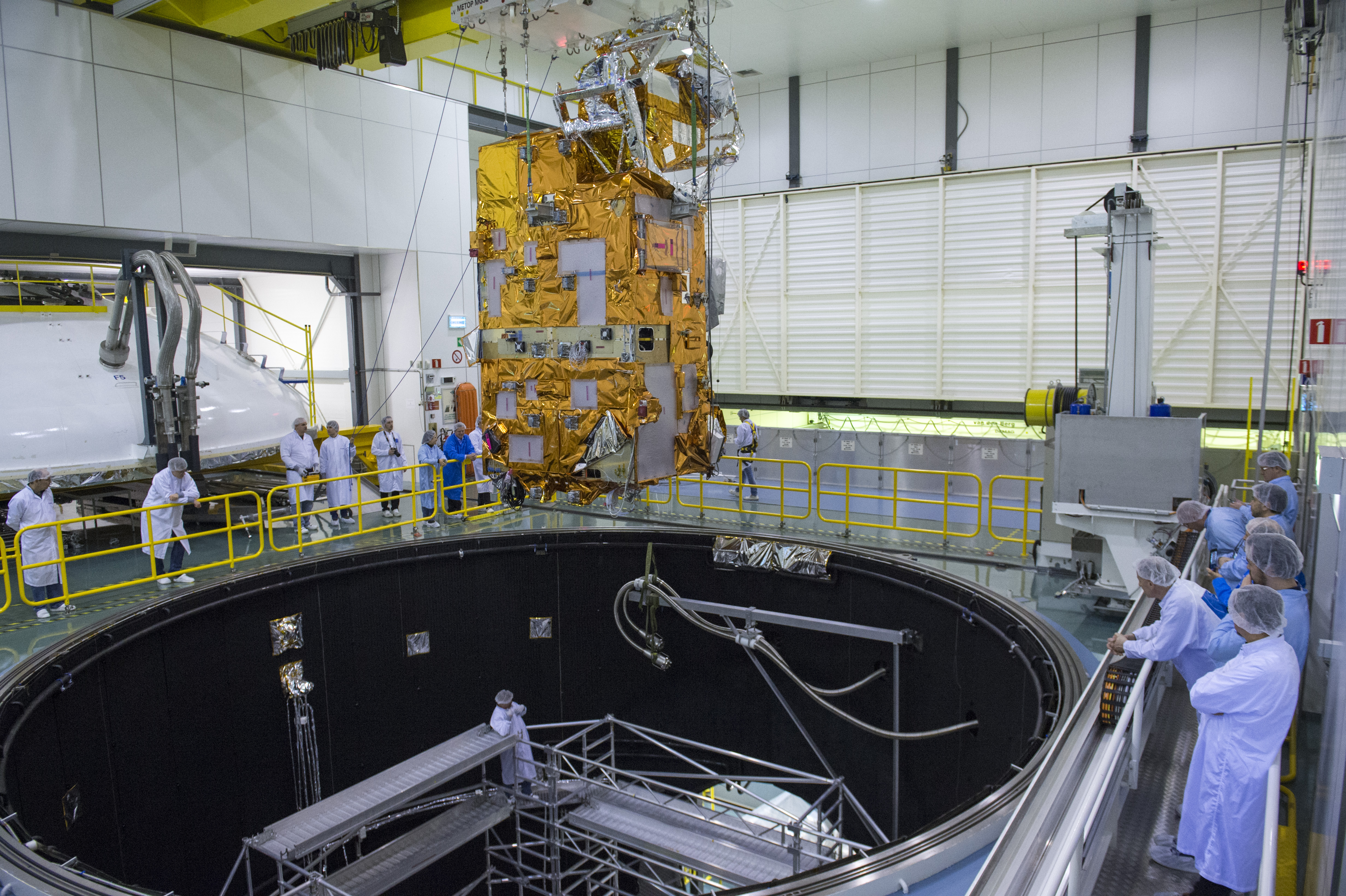
MetOp-C's payload module being lowered into ESTEC's Large Space Simulator, 2017

The following instruments are flown on board the MetOp satellites:

=== Shared instruments ===
The following instruments are shared on the NPOES satellites which form the U.S. contribution to IJPS:

- AMSU-A1/AMSU-A2 – Advanced Microwave Sounding Units
- HIRS/4 – High-resolution Infrared Radiation Sounder (N.B. Not included on MetOp-C)
- AVHRR/3 – Advanced Very High Resolution Radiometer
- Argos A-DCS – Advanced Data Collection System
- SEM-2 – Space Environment Monitor
- SARP-3 – Search And Rescue Processor (N.B. Not included on MetOp-C)
- SARR – Search And Rescue Repeater (N.B. Not included on MetOp-C)
- MHS – Microwave Humidity Sounder

=== MetOp specific instruments ===
The following instruments are flown exclusively on the MetOp satellites:

- IASI – Infrared Atmospheric Sounding Interferometer
- GRAS – Global Navigation Satellite System Receiver for Atmospheric Sounding
- ASCAT – Advanced SCATterometer
- GOME-2 – Global Ozone Monitoring Experiment-2

== Background ==
MetOp has been developed as a joint undertaking between the European Space Agency (ESA) and European Organisation for the Exploitation of Meteorological Satellites (EUMETSAT). Recognising the growing importance of Numerical Weather Prediction (NWP) in weather forecasting, MetOp was designed with a suite of instruments to provide NWP models with high resolution global atmospheric temperature and humidity structure. Data from MetOp are additionally used for atmospheric chemistry and provision of long term data sets for climate records.

=== MetOp heritage ===
The MetOp satellites have a modular construction, comprising a Service Module, a Payload Module and a suite of instruments.

A SPOT heritage service module provides power (via solar array and five batteries for eclipse), attitude and orbit control, thermal regulation and Tracking, Telemetry and Command (TT&C). An Envisat heritage payload module provides common command and control and power buses for the instruments along with science data acquisition and transmission.

The suite of instruments are largely derived from precursors flown on the European Space Agency's European Remote-Sensing Satellite ERS / Envisat satellites or are fully recurrent units originally developed for NOAA's Television Infrared Observation Satellite (TIROS) series of polar-orbiting satellites.

== Data acquisition ==
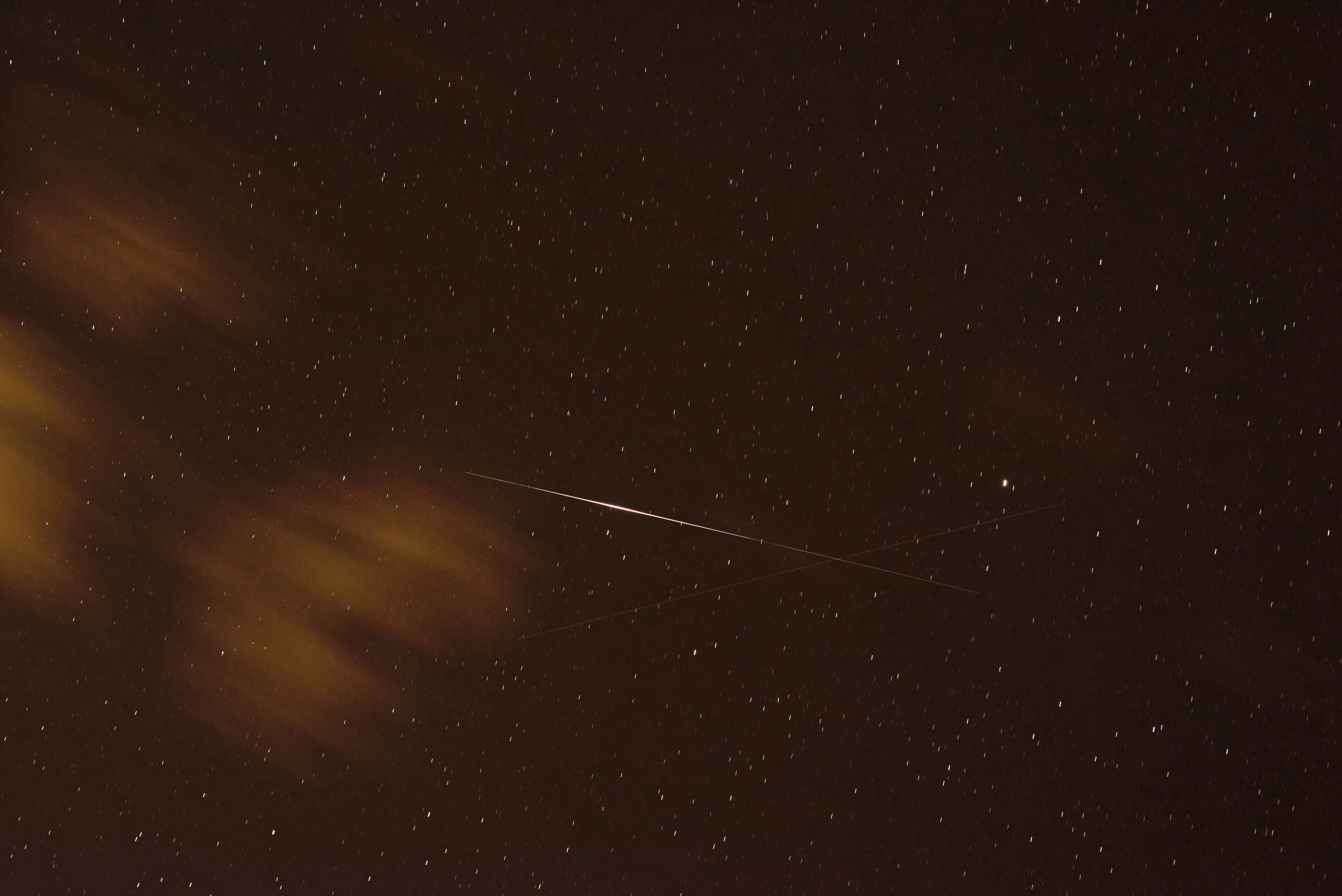
Satellite flare from MetOp-A, May 2019

With the exception of Search and Rescue (SARSAT), which is a purely local mission with its own dedicated transmitter, all data from the MetOp Instruments are formatted and multiplexed by the Payload Module and either stored on a solid-state recorder for later transmission via an X-Band antenna, or directly transmitted to local users via Advanced High Resolution Picture Transmission (AHRPT) L-Band antenna.

The main Command and Data Acquisition (CDA) head is located at Svalbard Satellite Station in Norway. The high latitude of this station allows the global data stored in the solid state recorder of each satellite to be dumped via X-Band once per orbit. Each MetOp satellite produces approximately 2 GB of raw data per orbit. Additionally, in order to improve timeliness of products, one of the operational satellites dumps the data from the descending part of the orbit over the McMurdo Station in Antarctica. Data are then trickle fed from the ground stations to EUMETSAT Headquarters in Darmstadt, Germany, where they are processed, stored and disseminated to various agencies and organisations with a latency of approximately 2 hours without the McMurdo ground station and 1 hour with Svalbard.

AHRPT is used to provide a real-time direct readout local mission via a network of receivers on ground provided by cooperating organisations. Data from these stations is also transmitted to EUMETSAT and redistributed to provide a regional service with approximately 30 minutes latency. Due to radiation sensitivity of the AHRPT hardware, the MetOp-A AHRPT did not operate over the polar regions or South Atlantic Anomaly.

== Command and control ==
Command and Control of MetOp is performed from the EPS Control Room at EUMETSAT Headquarters in Darmstadt, Germany. The control center is connected to the CDA in Svalbard which is used for S-Band ranging and doppler measurements (for orbit determination), acquisition of real-time house keeping telemetry and uplink of telecommands. The CDA at Svalbard, located at approximately 78° North, provides TT&C coverage on each orbit. Commands for routine operations are generally uplinked at each CDA contact, approximately 36 hours in advance of on-board execution. Orbit determination can also be performed using data from the GNSS Receiver for Atmospheric Sounding (GRAS) instrument. An independent back-up control center is also located at Instituto Nacional de Técnica Aeroespacial, near Madrid, Spain.

== Mission profile ==
The MetOp and NOAA satellites both carry a common set of core instruments. In addition, MetOp carries a set of new European instruments, which measure atmospheric temperature and humidity with unprecedented accuracy along with profiles of atmospheric ozone and other trace gases. Wind speed and direction over the oceans will also be measured. It is expected that these new instruments will contribute to the growing need for fast and accurate global data to improve numerical weather prediction. This is intended to produce more-reliable weather forecasts and, in the longer-term, help with monitoring changing climates more accurately.

In addition to its meteorological uses, it will provide imagery of land and ocean surfaces as well as search and rescue equipment to aid ships and aircraft in distress. A data relay system is also on board, linking up to buoys and other data collection devices.

== Launch and deployment ==
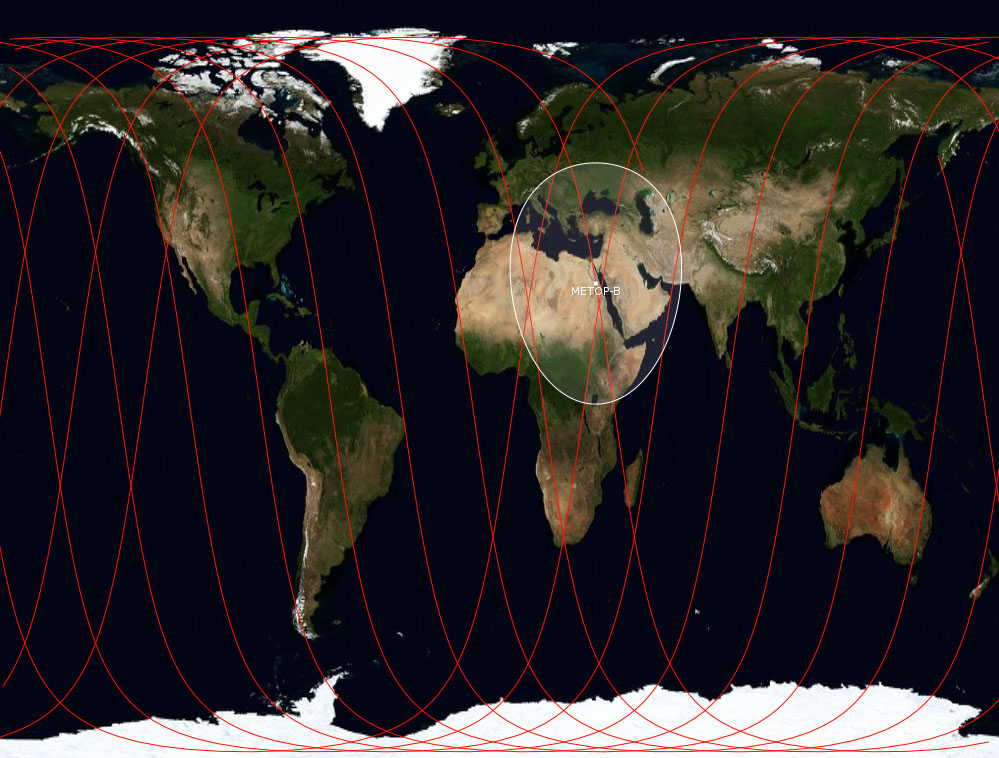
Ground track of MetOp-B, September 2012

MetOp-A, the first operational European polar-orbiting meteorological satellite, was successfully launched on 19 October 2006 from Baikonur Cosmodrome, Kazakhstan using a Soyuz-ST Fregat launch vehicle, after six attempts. At just over 4000 kg and measuring 17.6 × 6.5 × 5.2 metres when in orbit, MetOp is Europe's second-largest Earth-observation satellite, after Envisat which was launched in 2002.

The first signal from the satellite was received at 18:35 BST on 20 October 2006, and it was confirmed that the satellite was in its nominally correct orbit with the solar panel deployed. Control of the satellite was with the European Space Operations Centre (ESOC — part of ESA) which had the responsibility of achieving the final positioning of the satellite, deployment of all the antennas and final reconfiguration of the satellite following necessary orbit control maneuvers. The satellite was handed over to EUMETSAT operations on 22 October 2006. The first image was received at 08:00 UTC on 25 October 2006 — a visible light image of Scandinavia and Eastern Europe — but there was a six-month period of verification and calibration of the satellite and its instrument payload before it was declared operational. Before that point, the Met Office received data and started to test and then use it as input to the operational numerical weather prediction runs.

MetOp-A was declared fully operational in mid-May 2007 and the full data of its 11 scientific instruments are available to its users on operational basis

MetOp-B was declared fully operational and pronounced to replace MetOp-A as "EUMETSAT's prime operational SSO weather satellite" in April 2013.

MetOp-C was scheduled for launch towards the end of 2016, which was postponed until 2017 and was launched successfully on 7 November 2018.

Due to the longer than expected in-orbit performance of MetOp-A and MetOp-B, all three MetOp spacecraft were operated simultaneously until decommissioning of MetOp-A, MetOp-B and eventually MetOp-C. MetOp spacecraft will be succeeded in their operational role by the MetOp Second Generation satellites. EUMETSAT began de-orbiting MetOp-A in November 2021

== GOME-2 ==
The first atmospheric contributions by MetOp-A were made by the Global Ozone Monitoring Experiment-2 (GOME-2), a scanning spectrometer on board the satellite. GOME-2, designed by DLR (the German Aerospace Centre) and developed by SELEX Galileo as the successor of ERS-2's GOME (1995), provided coverage of most areas of planet Earth measuring the atmospheric ozone, the distribution of surface ultraviolet radiation, and the amount of nitrogen dioxide (NO_{2}). In addition, sun-induced chlorophyll fluorescence, a proxy for gross primary production, can be observed using the GOME-2 instrument. The GOME-2 instrument provides a second source of ozone observations that supplement data from the SBUV/2 ozone instruments on the NOAA-18 and NOAA-19 satellites, which are part of the IJPS.

== Infrared atmospheric sounding interferometer (IASI) ==
One of the most important instruments carried on board MetOp is the Infrared atmospheric sounding interferometer (IASI), the most accurate infrared sounding interferometer currently in orbit. IASI observes the atmosphere in the infra-red (3.7 – 15.5 μm) in 8461 channels, allowing to measure the atmosphere temperature within 1 °C and relative humidity within 10% for each slice of 1 km height. Earth surface is revisited twice a day. IASI by itself produces half of all MetOp data.

== The MetOp constellation ==
MetOp-A and MetOp-B were launched respectively on 19 October 2006 and 17 September 2012, from the Baikonur Cosmodrome, with MetOp-C being launched on 7 November 2018 from the Centre Spatial Guyanais, at Kourou spaceport, Guiana Space Centre.

It was originally planned that subsequent MetOp satellites will be launched at approximately five-year intervals, each having a planned operational life of 5 years – as such there would just be one operational satellite at a time. However, based on the good performance of both the MetOp-A and MetOp-B satellites, EUMETSAT council agreed to extend the EPS programme until at least 2027. MetOp-A was operated until 30 November 2021, and similar extensions are projected for MetOp-B and MetOp-C.

The last MetOp-A Out of Plane manoeuvre was performed in August 2016, almost all remaining fuel on board MetOp-A was budgeted for end-of-life disposal operations required to put MetOp-A in an orbit which will decay and cause re-entry within 25 years in accordance with ISO 24113 Space Debris Mitigation Guidelines. At the end of 2022, the same fuel reserve process was enforced on MetOp-B. The vast majority of fuel consumption during the operations phase is needed to compensate for inclination drift and maintain a Sun-synchronous orbit (SSO) with a mean local time of the ascending node (LTAN) of 21:30, and it is estimated that the platform can survive for at least 5 years with a drifting LTAN. These end-of-life disposal operations were initially unplanned, but are deemed necessary after the Iridium-Cosmos collision and Fengyun-1C anti-satellite test have significantly worsened the space debris situation in low Earth orbit (LEO).

Prior to the launch of MetOp-C, MetOp-A and MetOp-B were operated in a co-planar orbit approximately half an orbit apart. With the launch of MetOp-C, the three MetOp satellites initially share the same orbit separated by approximately a third of an orbit, albeit with MetOp-A drifting in LTAN. However, after Summer 2020 MetOp-C was relocated to be approximately half an orbit apart from MetOp-B, with MetOp-A held between the other MetOp satellites in preparation for its disposal. MetOp-B and MetOp-C High Rate Picture Transmission (HRPT) transmits real-time data continuously.

MetOp-A had its orbit lowered by performing 23 apogee manoeuvres to almost empty its fuel tanks and is expected to re-enter the Earth's atmosphere within 25 years. MetOp-A was decommissioned on 30 November 2021, after which only MetOp-B and C remain phased approximately 180 degrees apart. Due to LTAN drift, MetOp-B left the reference orbit ground track in October 2023, but a series of Out of Plane Manoeuvres were performed in September 2025 to potentially extend the MetOp-B mission to 2030. MetOps are being rephased after launch of the first MetOp-SG, such that a tandem mission between MetOp-SGA1 and MetOp-C can be performed to cross calibrate old and new instruments. After the tandem mission all MetOps will be phased such that they are either half or quarter of an orbit apart.

== See also ==
- Satellite flare
- MetOp Second Generation
