= NOAA-18 =

American weather satellite (2005–2025)

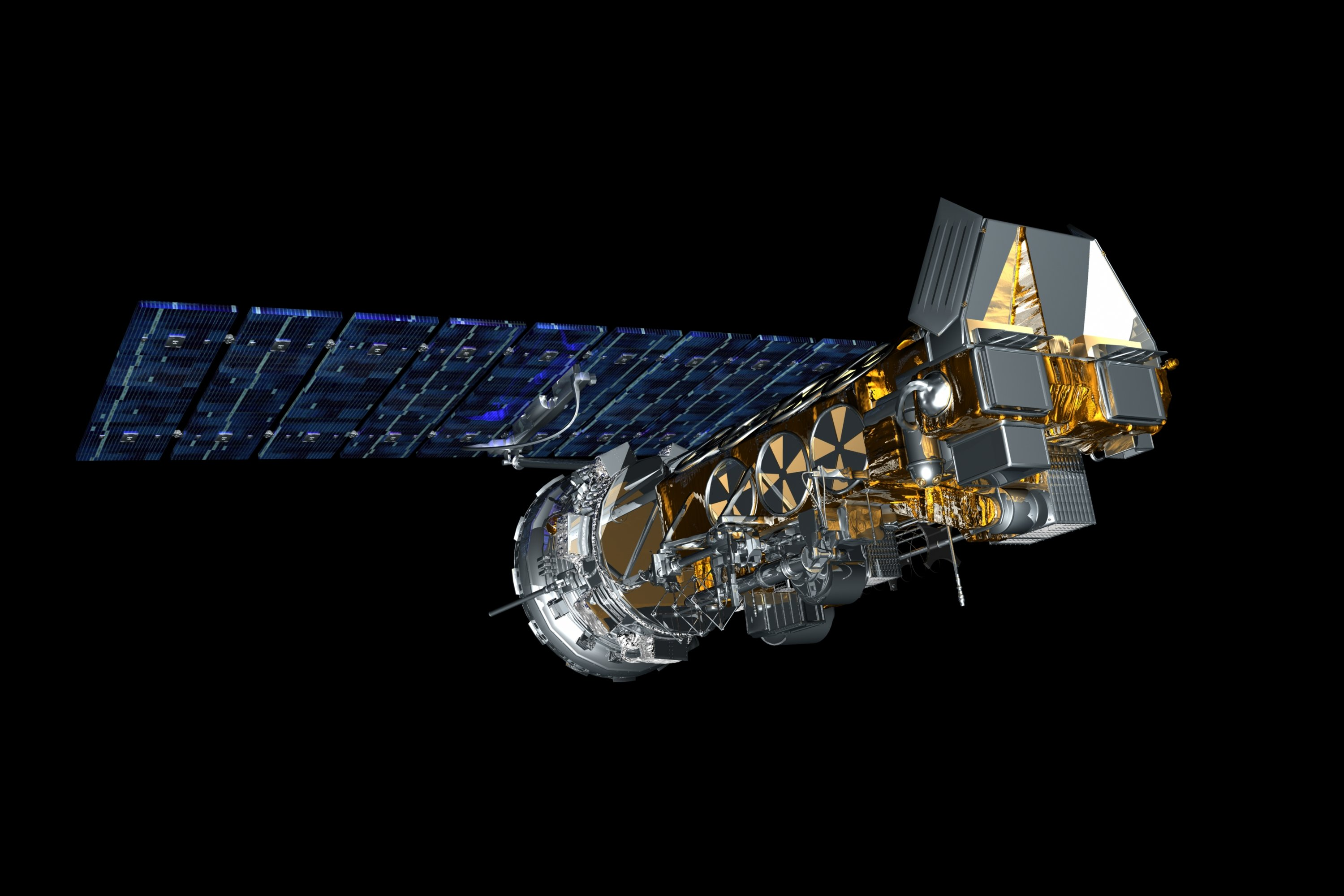
- Computer-generated image of NOAA-18 in orbit
- Names: NOAA-N
- Mission type: Weather
- Operator: NOAA
- COSPAR ID: 2005-018A
- SATCAT no.: 28654
- Mission duration: 2 years (planned); 20 years, 17 days (achieved)

Spacecraft properties
- Spacecraft type: TIROS
- Bus: Advanced TIROS-N
- Manufacturer: Lockheed Martin Space
- Launch mass: 2,232 kg (4,921 lb)
- Dry mass: 1479 kg
- Dimensions: 4.19 m (13.7 ft) of long 1.88 m (6 ft 2 in) of diameter 2.73 by 6.14 m (solar array)
- Power: 833 watts

Start of mission
- Launch date: 20 May 2005, 10:22:01 UTC
- Rocket: Delta II 7320-10C (Delta D312)
- Launch site: Vandenberg, SLC-2W
- Contractor: Boeing
- Entered service: 30 August 2005

End of mission
- Disposal: Decommissioned
- Deactivated: 17:49 UTC, June 6, 2025

Orbital parameters
- Reference system: Geocentric orbit
- Regime: Sun-synchronous orbit
- Altitude: 854 km (531 mi)
- Inclination: 98.74°
- Period: 102.12 minutes
Instruments
- AVHRR/3: Advanced Very High Resolution Radiometer
- HIRS/4: High Resolution Infrared Sounder
- SEM-2: Space Environment Monitor
- Argos DCS-2: Data Collection System
- SARSAT: Search and Rescue Satellite-Aided Tracking System
- SBUV/2: Solar Backscatter Ultraviolet Radiometer
- AMSU-A: Advanced Microwave Sounding Unit
- MHS: Microwave Humidity Sounder

NOAA-18, also known as NOAA-N before launch, is a decommissioned, polar orbiting, weather satellite series (NOAA K-N) operated by the National Environmental Satellite Service (NESS) of the National Oceanic and Atmospheric Administration (NOAA). NOAA-18 also continued the series of Advanced TIROS-N (ATN) spacecraft begun with the launch of NOAA-8 (NOAA-E) in 1983 but with additional new and improved instrumentation over the NOAA A-M series and a new launch vehicle (Titan 23G). NOAA-18 is in an afternoon equator-crossing orbit and replaced NOAA-17 as the prime afternoon spacecraft. NOAA-18 was decommissioned as of 17:49 UTC, June 6, 2025.

== Launch ==
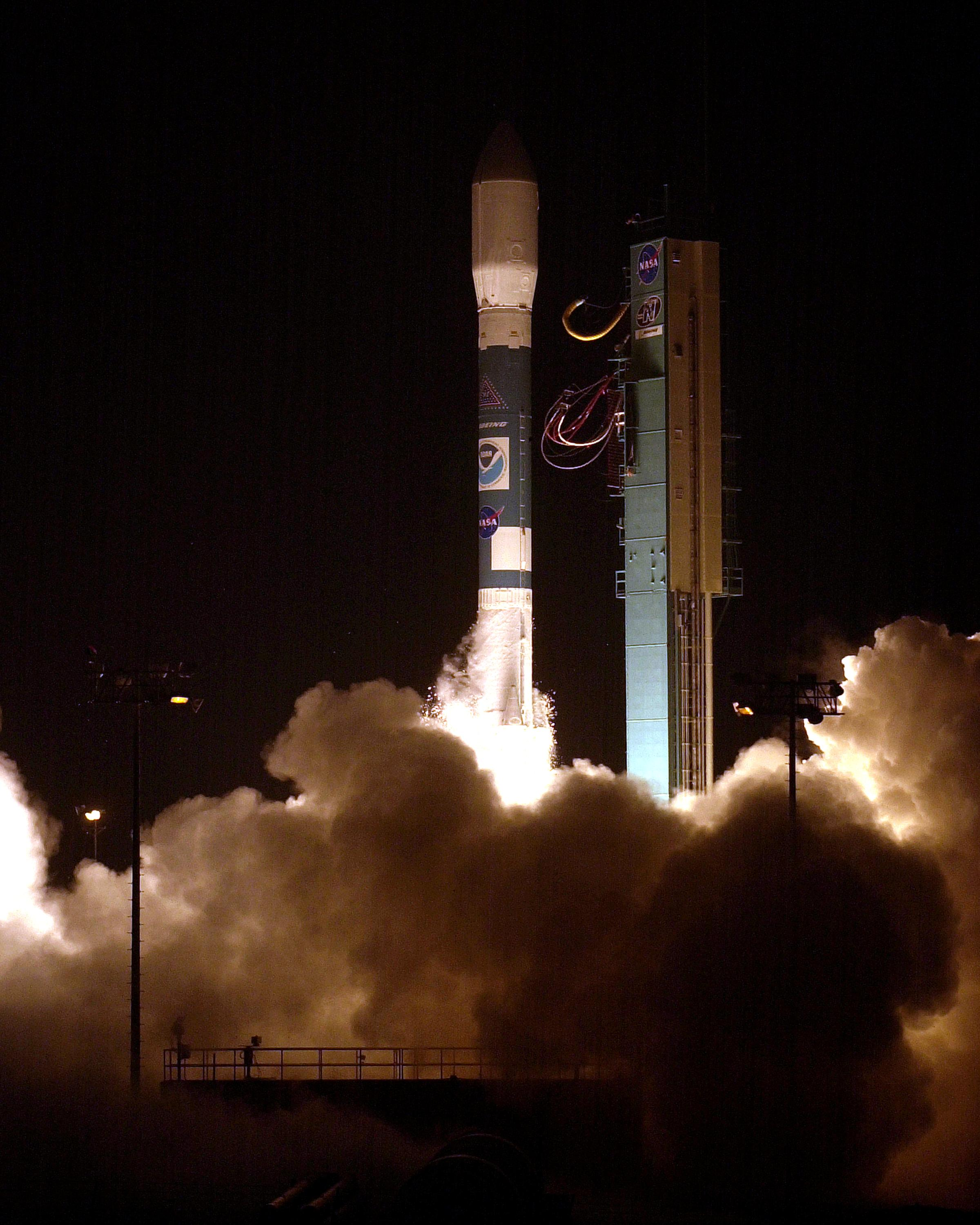
Launch of NOAA-18

NOAA-18 was launched by the Delta II launch vehicle on 20 May 2005 at 10:22:01 UTC from Vandenberg Air Force Base, at Vandenberg Space Launch Complex 4 (SLW-4W), in a Sun-synchronous orbit, at 854 km above the Earth, orbiting every 102.12 minutes. NOAA-18 is in an afternoon equator-crossing orbit and has replaced the NOAA-17 as the prime afternoon spacecraft.

== Spacecraft ==
The goal of the NOAA/NESS polar orbiting program is to provide output products used in meteorological prediction and warning, oceanographic and hydrologic services, and space environment monitoring. The polar orbiting system complements the NOAA/NESS geostationary meteorological satellite program (GOES). The NOAA-18 Advanced TIROS-N spacecraft is based on the Defense Meteorological Satellite Program (DMSP Block 5D) spacecraft and is a modified version of the ATN spacecraft (NOAA 6–11, 13–17) to accommodate the new instrumentation, supporting antennas and electrical subsystems. The spacecraft structure consists of four components: 1° the Reaction System Support (RSS); 2° the Equipment Support Module (ESM); 3° the Instrument Mounting Platform (IMP); and 4° the Solar Array (SA).

== Instruments ==
All of the instruments are located on the ESM and the IMP. The spacecraft power is provided by a direct energy transfer system from the single solar array which consists of eight panels of solar cells. The in-orbit Attitude Determination and Control Subsystem (ADACS) provides three-axis pointing control by controlling torque in three mutually orthogonal momentum wheels with input from the Earth Sensor Assembly (ESA) for pitch, roll, and yaw updates. The ADACS controls the spacecraft attitude so that orientation of the three axes is maintained to within ± 0.2° and pitch, roll, and yaw to within 0.1°. The ADACS consists of the Earth Sensor Assembly (ESA), the Sun Sensor Assembly (SSA), four Reaction Wheel Assemblies (RWA), two roll/yaw coils (RYC), two pitch torquing coils (PTC), four gyros, and computer software for data processing. The ATN data handling subsystem, consists of the TIROS Information Processor (TIP) for low data rate instruments, the Manipulated Information Rate Processor (MIRP) for high data rate AVHRR, digital tape recorders (DTR), and a cross strap unit (XSU).

The NOAA-18 instrument complement consists of:

1. An improved six-channel Advanced Very High Resolution Radiometer/3 (AVHRR/3)
2. An improved High Resolution Infrared Radiation Sounder (HIRS/4)
3. The Search and Rescue Satellite Aided Tracking System (SARSAT), which consists of the Search and Rescue Repeater (SARR) and the Search and Rescue Processor (SARP-2)
4. The French/CNES-provided improved Argos Data Collection System (Argos DCS-2)
5. The Solar Backscatter Ultraviolet Spectral radiometer (SBUV/2)
6. The Advanced Microwave Sounding Unit (AMSU), which consists of three separate modules, A1, A2, and B to replace the previous MSU and SSU instruments. NOAA-18 is the first NOAA POES satellite to use Microwave Humidity Sounder (MHS) in place of Advanced Microwave Sounding Unit (AMSU-B).

=== Advanced Very High Resolution Radiometer (AVHRR/3) ===
The AVHRR/3 on the Advanced TIROS-N (ATN) NOAA K-L series of polar orbiting meteorological satellites is an improved instrument over previous AVHRRs. The AVHRR/3 adds a sixth channel and is a cross-track scanning instrument providing imaging and radiometric data in the visible, near-IR and infrared of the same area on the Earth. Data from the visible and near-IR channels provide information on vegetation, clouds, snow, and ice. Data from the near-IR and thermal channels provide information on the land and ocean surface temperature and radiative properties of clouds. Only five channels can be transmitted simultaneously with channels 3A and 3B being switched for day/night operation. The instrument produces data in High Resolution Picture Transmission (HRPT) mode at 1.1 km resolution or in Automatic Picture Transmission (APT) mode at a reduced resolution of 4 km. The AVHRR/3 scans 55.4° per scan line on either side of the orbital track and scans 360 lines per minute. The six channels are: 1) channel 1, visible (0.58-0.68 μm); 2) channel 2, near-IR (0.725-1.0 μm); 3) channel 3A, near-IR (1.58-1.64 μm); 4) channel 3B, infrared (3.55-3.93 μm; 5) channel 4, infrared (10.3-11.3 μm); and 6) channel 5 (11.5-12.5 μm).

=== High Resolution Infrared Sounder (HIRS/4) ===
The improved HIRS/4 on the Advanced TIROS-N (ATN) NOAA K-N series of polar orbiting meteorological satellites is a 20-channel, step-scanned, visible and infrared spectrometer designed to provide atmospheric temperature and moisture profiles. The HIRS/4 instrument is basically identical to the HIRS/3 flown on previous spacecraft except for changes in six spectral bands to improve the sounding accuracy. The HIRS/4 is used to derive water vapor, ozone, and cloud liquid water content. The instrument scans 49.5° on either side of the orbital track with a ground resolution at nadir of 17.4 km. The instrument produces 56 IFOVs for each 1,125 km scan line at 42 km between IFOVs along-track. The instrument consists of 19 IR and 1 visible channel centered at 14.95, 14.71, 14.49, 14.22, 13.97, 13.64, 13.35, 11.11, 9.71, 12.45, 7.33, 6.52, 4.57, 4.52, 4.47, 4.45, 4.13, 4.0, 3.76, and 0.69 μm.

=== Advanced Microwave Sounding Unit (AMSU-A) ===
The AMSU-A is an instrument on the Advanced TIROS-N (ATN) NOAA K-N series of operational meteorological satellites. The AMSU consists of two functionally independent units, AMSU-A and AMSU-B. The AMSU-A is a line-scan instrument designed to measure scene radiance in 15 channels, ranging from 23.8 to 89 GHz, to derive atmospheric temperature profiles from the Earth's surface to about 3 millibar pressure height. The instrument is a total power system having a field of view (FOV) of 3.3° at half-power points. The antenna provides cross track scan 50° on either side of the orbital track at nadir with a total of 30 IFOVs per scan line. The AMSU-A is calibrated on-board using a blackbody and space as references. The AMSU-A is physically divided into two separate modules which interface independently with the spacecraft. The AMSU-A1 contains all of the 5 mm oxygen channels (channels 3–14) and the 80 GHz channel. The AMSU-A2 module consists of two low-frequency channels (channels 1 and 2). The 15 channels have a center frequency at: 23.8, 31.4, 50.3, 52.8, 53.6, 54.4, 54.94, 55.5, six at 57.29, and 89 GHz.

=== Microwave Humidity Sounder (MHS) ===
The MHS is a new instrument on the Advanced TIROS-N (ATN) NOAA K-N series of operational meteorological satellites. The Microwave Humidity Sounder (MHS), built by EADS Astrium and donated by the European Organisation for the Exploitation of Meteorological Satellites (EUMETSAT), is a five-channel microwave instrument intended primarily to measure profiles of atmospheric humidity.

=== Space Environment Monitor (SEM-2) ===
The SEM-2 on the Advanced TIROS-N (ATN) NOAA K-N series of polar orbiting meteorological satellites provides measurements to determine the population of the Earth's radiation belts and data on charged particle precipitation in the upper atmosphere as a result of solar activity. The SEM-2 consists of two separate sensors the Total Energy Detector (TED) and the Medium Energy Proton/Electron Detector (MEPED). In addition, the SEM-2 includes a common Data Processing Unit (DPU). The TED uses eight programmed swept electrostatic curved-plate analyzers to select particle type and energy and Channeltron detectors to measure the intensity in the selected energy bands. The particle energies range from 50 eV to 20 keV. The MEPED detects protons, electrons, and ions with energies from 30 keV to several tens of MeV. The MEPED consists of four directional solid-state detector telescopes and four omnidirectional sensors. The DPU sorts and counts the events and the results are multiplexed and incorporated into the satellite telemetry system. Once received on the ground, the SEM-2 data is separated from the rest of the data and sent to the NOAA Space Environment Laboratory in Boulder, Colorado, for processing and dissemination.

=== Solar Backscatter Ultraviolet Radiometer (SBUV/2) ===
The SBUV/2 on the Advanced TIROS-N (ATN) NOAA K-N series of polar orbiting meteorological satellites is a dual monochromator ultraviolet grating spectrometer for stratospheric ozone measurements. The SBUV/2 is designed to measure scene radiance and solar spectral irradiance in the ultraviolet spectral range from 160 to 406 nm. Measurements are made in discrete mode or sweep mode. In discrete mode, measurements are made in 12 spectral bands from which the total ozone and vertical distribution of ozone are derived. In the sweep mode, a continuous spectral scan from 160 to 406 nm is made primarily for computation of ultraviolet solar spectral irradiance. The 12 spectral channels are (in nm): 252.0, 273.61, 283.1, 287.7, 292,29, 297.59, 301.97, 305.87, 312.57, 317.56, 331.26, and 339.89 nm.

=== Search and Rescue Satellite Aided Tracking System (SARSAT) ===
The SARSAT on the Advanced TIROS-N (ATN) NOAA K-N series of polar orbiting meteorological satellites is designed to detect and locate Emergency Locator Transmitters (ELTs) and Emergency Position-Indicating Radio Beacons (EPIRB). The SARSAT instrumentation consists of two elements: the Search and Rescue Repeater (SARR) and the Search and Rescue Processor (SARP-2). The SARR is a radiofrequency (RF) system that accepts signals from emergency ground transmitters at three very high frequency (VHF/UHF) ranges (121.5 MHz, 243 MHz and 406.05 MHz) and translates, multiplexes, and transmits these signals at L-band frequency (1.544 GHz) to local Search and Rescue stations (LUTs or Local User Terminals) on the ground. The location of the transmitter is determined by retrieving the Doppler information in the relayed signal at the LUT. The SARP-2 is a receiver and processor that accepts digital data from emergency ground transmitters at UHF and demodulates, processes, stores, and relays the data to the SARR where they are combined with the three SARR signals and transmitted via L-band frequency to local stations.

=== ARGOS Data Collection System (Argos DCS-2) ===
The Argos Data Collection System (DCS-2) on the Advanced TIROS-N (ATN) NOAA K-N series of polar orbiting meteorological satellites is a random-access system for the collection of meteorological data from in situ platforms (moveable and fixed). The ARGOS DCS-2 collects telemetry data using a one-way RF link from data collection platforms (such as buoys, free-floating balloons and remote weather stations) and processes the inputs for on-board storage and later transmission from the spacecraft. For free-floating platforms, the DCS-2 system determines the position to within 5 to 8 km RMS and velocity to an accuracy of 1.0 to 1.6 mps RMS. The DCS-2 measures the in-coming signal frequency and time. The formatted data are stored on the satellite for transmission to NOAA stations. The DCS-2 data is stripped from the GAC data by NOAA/NESDIS and sent to the Argos center at CNES in France for processing, distribution to users, and archival.

== Telecommunications ==
The TIP formats low bit rate instruments and telemetry to tape recorders and direct read-out. The MIRP process high data rate AVHRR to tape recorders (GAC) and direct read-out (HRPT and LAC). On-board recorders can store 110 minutes of GAC, 10 minutes HRPT and 250 minutes TIP.

== Mission ==
APT transmission frequency was 137.9125 MHz (After NOAA-18 changed frequencies with NOAA-19 on 23 June 2009).

On June 5, 2025, NOAA announced that as of 17:49 UTC on June 6, 2025, NOAA-18 would be permanently decommissioned, citing a power drop in the S-Band Transmitter 4 that could not be fully recovered. NOAA directed users to transition to the Joint Polar Satellite System (JPSS) as a replacement for NOAA-18.
