= NOAA-15 =

American weather satellite (1998–2025)

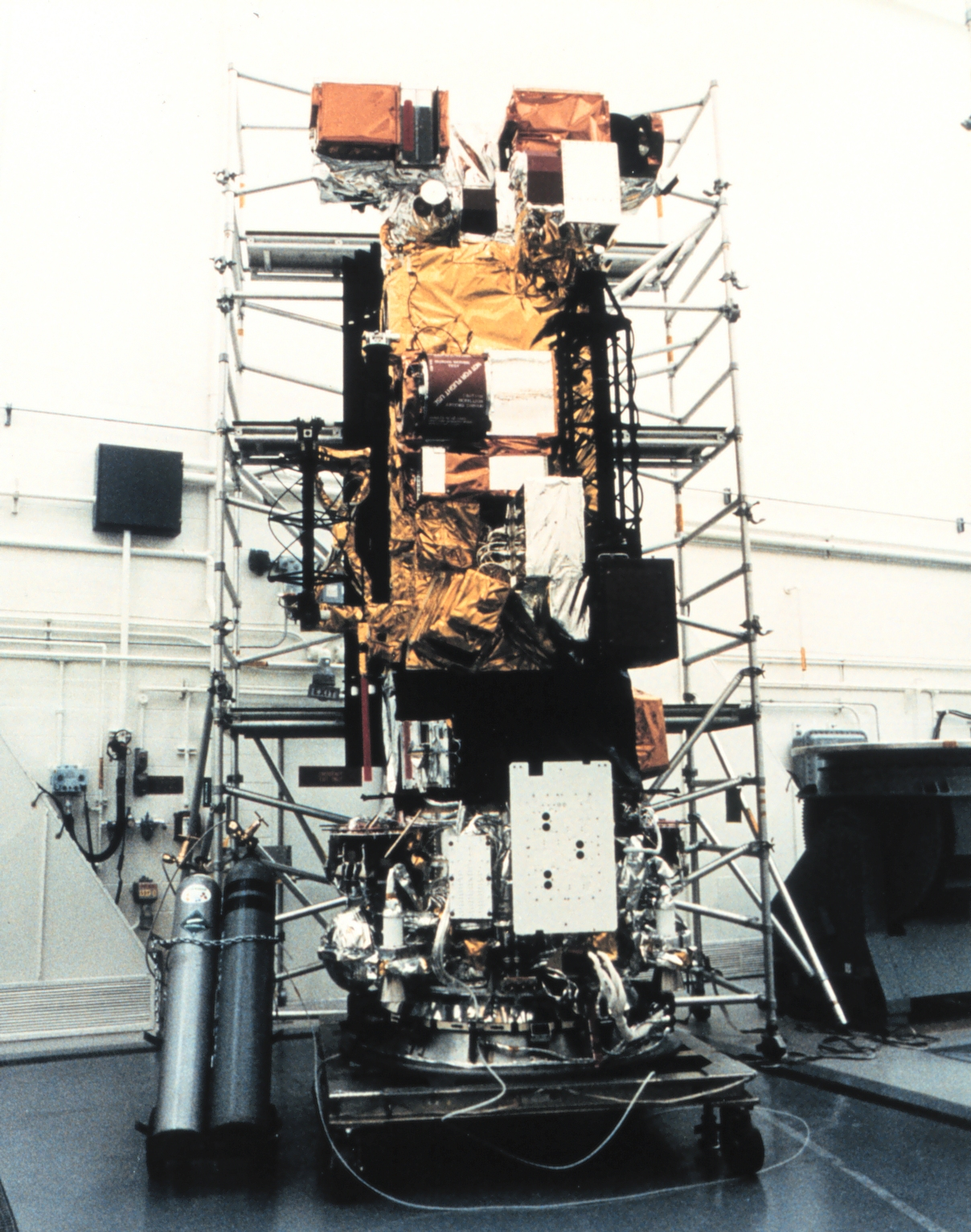
- Meteorological satellite NOAA K (15) being readied for launch at Vandenberg Air Force Base.
- Names: NOAA-K
- Mission type: Weather
- Operator: NOAA
- COSPAR ID: 1998-030A
- SATCAT no.: 25338
- Mission duration: 2 years (planned); 27 years, 3 months and 6 days (achieved)

Spacecraft properties
- Spacecraft type: TIROS
- Bus: Advanced TIROS-N
- Manufacturer: Lockheed Martin
- Launch mass: 2,232 kg (4,921 lb)
- Dry mass: 1,479 kg (3,261 lb)
- Power: 833 watts

Start of mission
- Launch date: 13 May 1998, 15:52:04 UTC
- Rocket: Titan 23G Star-37XFP-ISS (Titan 23G S/N G-12)
- Launch site: Vandenberg, SLC-4W
- Contractor: Lockheed Martin
- Entered service: 15 December 1998

End of mission
- Disposal: Decommissioned
- Deactivated: 19 August 2025, 20:37 UTC

Orbital parameters
- Reference system: Geocentric orbit
- Regime: Sun-synchronous orbit
- Perigee altitude: 808.0 km (502.1 mi)
- Apogee altitude: 824.0 km (512.0 mi)
- Inclination: 98.70°
- Period: 101.20 minutes
Instruments
- AVHRR/3: Advanced Very High Resolution Radiometer
- HIRS/3: High Resolution Infrared Sounder
- SEM-2: Space Environment Monitor
- Argos DCS-2: Data Collection System
- SARSAT: Search and Rescue Satellite-Aided Tracking System
- SBUV/2: Solar Backscatter Ultraviolet Radiometer
- AMSU-A: Advanced Microwave Sounding Unit-A
- AMSU-B: Advanced Microwave Sounding Unit-B

NOAA-15, also known as NOAA-K before launch, was a polar-orbiting, NASA-provided Television Infrared Observation Satellite (TIROS) series weather forecasting satellite operated by National Oceanic and Atmospheric Administration (NOAA). NOAA-15 was the latest in the Advanced TIROS-N (ATN) series. It provided support to environmental monitoring by complementing the NOAA/NESS Geostationary Operational Environmental Satellite program (GOES).

== Launch ==
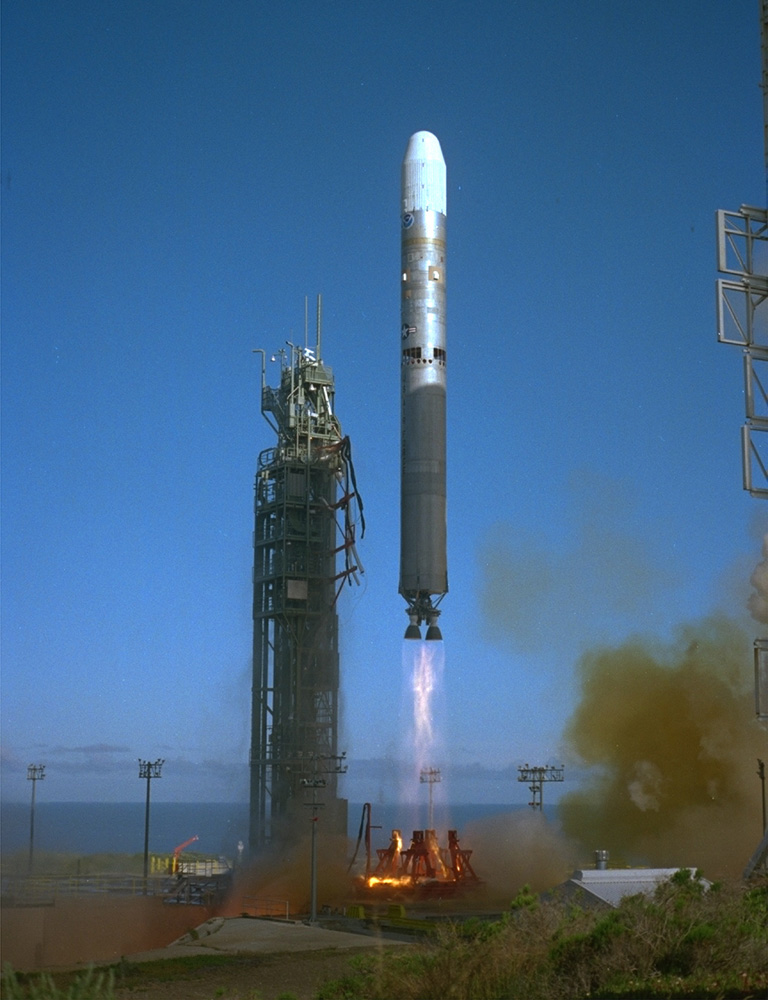
Launch of NOAA-15

It was launched by the Titan 23G launch vehicle on 13 May 1998 at 15:52:04 UTC from Vandenberg Air Force Base, at Vandenberg Space Launch Complex 4 (SLW-4W), NOAA-15 replaced the decommissioned NOAA-12 in an afternoon equator-crossing orbit and is in 2021 semi-operational, in a Sun-synchronous orbit (SSO), at 808.0 km above the Earth, orbiting every 101.20 minutes.

== Spacecraft ==
The goal of the NOAA/NESS polar orbiting program is to provide output products used in meteorological prediction and warning, oceanographic and hydrologic services, and space environment monitoring. The NOAA-I Advanced TIROS-N spacecraft is based on the Defense Meteorological Satellite Program (DMSP Block 5D) spacecraft and is modified version of the TIROS-N spacecraft (NOAA-1 to NOAA-5). The spacecraft structure consists of four components: 1° the Reaction System Support (RSS); 2° the Equipment Support Module (ESM), which has been expanded from the TIROS-N design; 3° the Instrument Mounting Platform (IMP); and 4° the Solar Array (SA).

== Instruments ==
All of the instruments are located on the ESM and the IMP. The spacecraft power is provided by a direct energy transfer system from the single solar array which consists of eight panels of solar cells. The power system for the Advanced TIROS-N has been upgraded from the previous TIROS-N design. The in-orbit Attitude Determination and Control Subsystem (ADACS) provides three-axis pointing control by controlling torque in three mutually orthogonal momentum wheels with input from the Earth Sensor Assembly (ESA) for pitch, roll, and yaw updates. The ADACS controls the spacecraft attitude so that orientation of the three axes is maintained to within ± 0.2° and pitch, roll, and yaw to within 0.1°. The ADACS consists of the Earth Sensor Assembly (ESA), the Sun Sensor Assembly (SSA), four Reaction Wheel Assemblies (RWA), two roll/yaw coils (RYC), two pitch torqueing coils (PTC), four gyros, and computer software for data processing.

Instruments were flown for imaging and measurement of the atmosphere of Earth, its surface, and cloud cover, including Earth radiation, atmospheric ozone, aerosol distribution, sea surface temperature, vertical temperature and water profiles in the troposphere and stratosphere; measurement of proton and electron flux at orbit altitude, and remote platform data collection, and for SARSAT. They included: 1° an improved six-channel Advanced Very High Resolution Radiometer (AVHRR/3); 2° an improved High Resolution Infrared Radiation Sounder (HIRS/3); 3° the Search and Rescue Satellite Aided Tracking System (SARSAT), which consists of the Search and Rescue Repeater (SARR) and the Search and Rescue Processor (SARP-2); 4° the French/CNES-provided improved ARGOS Data Collection System (DCS-2); and 5° the Advanced Microwave Sounding Units (AMSUs), which replaced the previous MSU and SSU instruments to become the first in the NOAA series to support dedicated microwave measurements of temperature, moisture, surface and hydrological studies in cloudy regions where visible and infrared instruments have decreased capability.

=== Advanced Very High Resolution Radiometer (AVHRR/3) ===
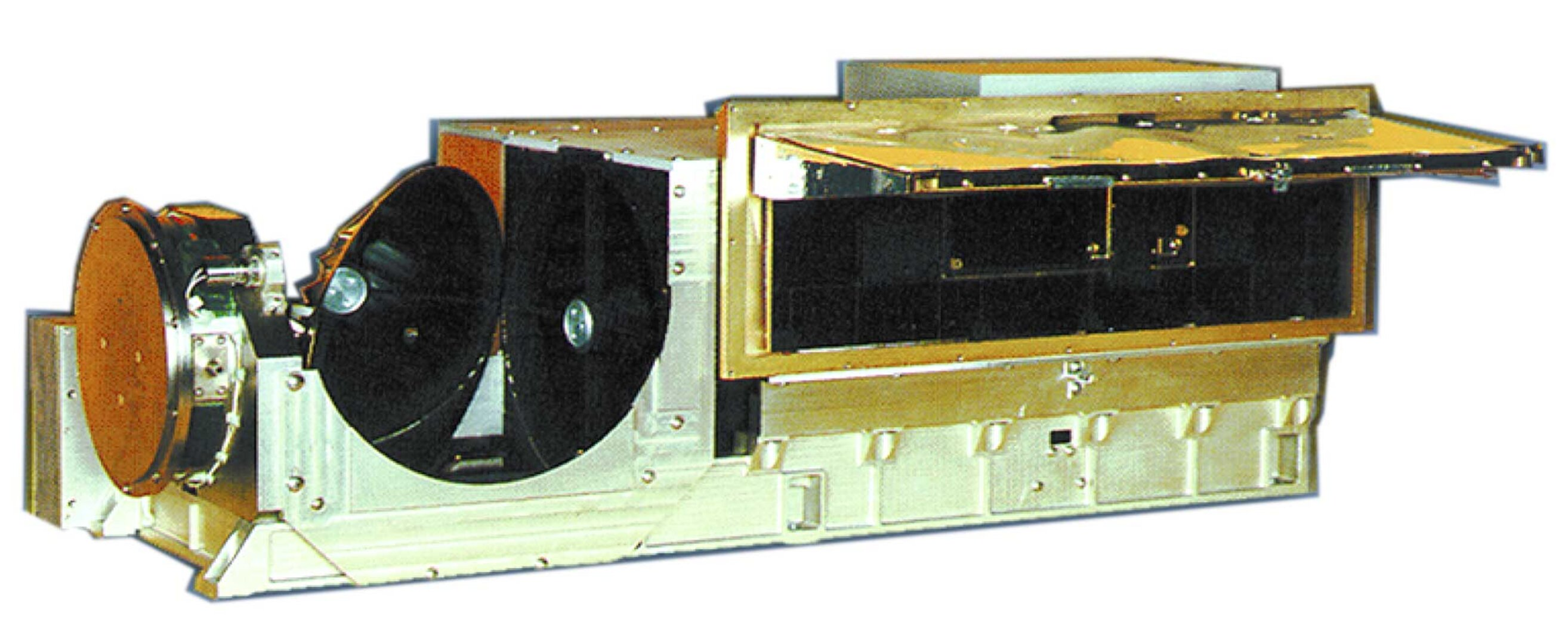
NOAA AVHRR/3 Instrument

The AVHRR/3 on the Advanced TIROS-N NOAA K-N series of polar orbiting meteorological satellites is an improved instrument over previous AVHRRs. The AVHRR/3 adds a sixth channel and is a cross-track scanning instrument providing imaging and radiometric data in the visible, near-IR and infrared of the same area on the Earth. Data from the visible and near-IR channels provide information on vegetation, clouds, snow, and ice. Data from the near-IR and thermal channels provide information on the land and ocean surface temperature and radiative properties of clouds. Only five channels can be transmitted simultaneously with channels 3A and 3B being switched for day/night operation. The instrument produces data in High Resolution Picture Transmission (HRPT) mode at 1.1 km resolution or in Automatic Picture Transmission (APT) mode at a reduced resolution of 4 km. The AVHRR/3 scans 55.4° per scan line on either side of the orbital track and scans 360 lines per minute. The six channels are: 1) channel 1, visible (0.58-0.68 μm); 2) channel 2, near-IR (0.725-1.0 μm); 3) channel 3A, near-IR (1.58-1.64 μm); 4) channel 3B, infrared (3.55-3.93 μm); 5) channel 4, infrared (10.3-11.3 μm); and 6) channel 5 (11.5-12.5 μm).

=== High Resolution Infrared Sounder (HIRS/3) ===
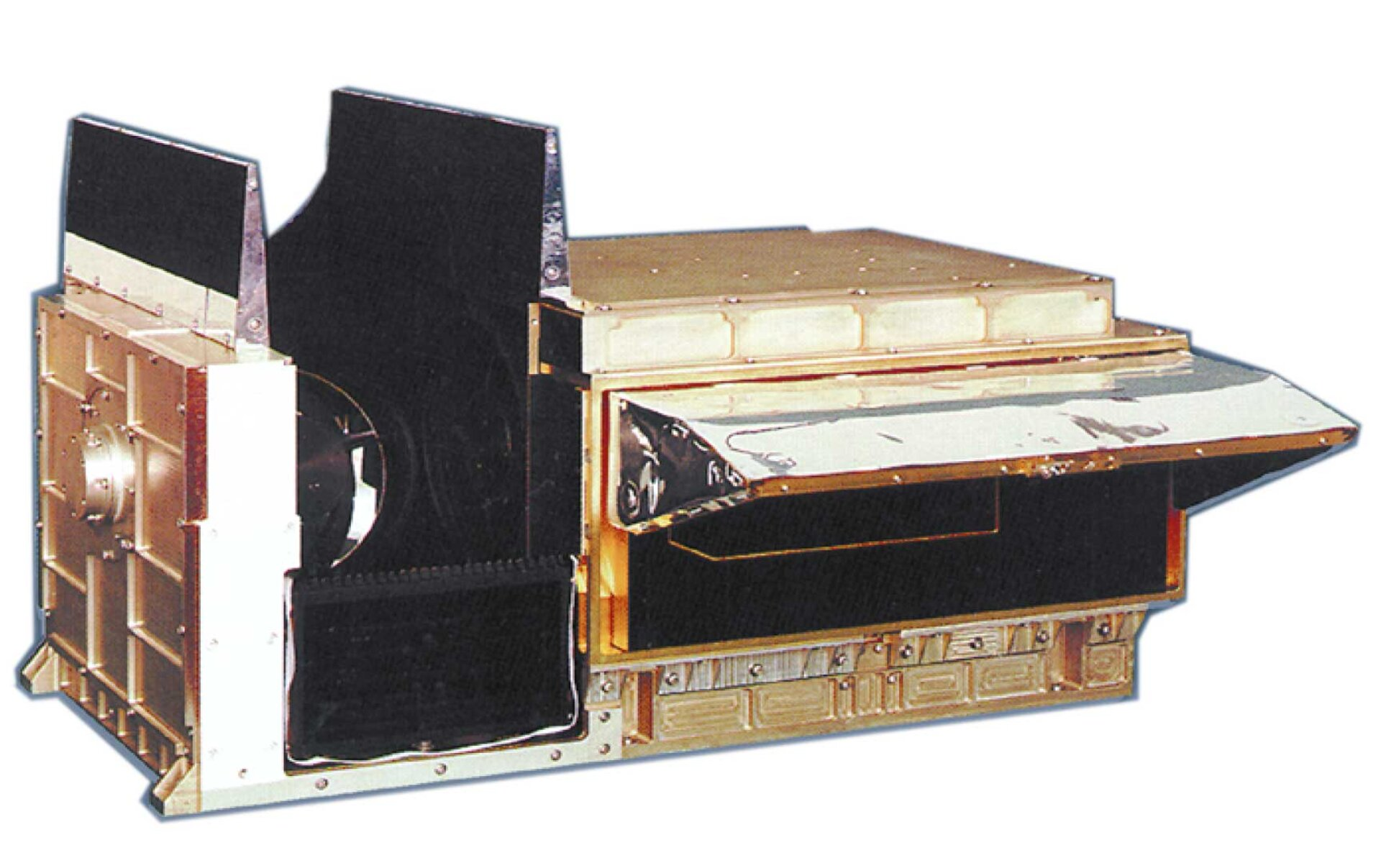
The HIRS/4 Satellite Instrument

The improved High Resolution Infrared Sounder/3 (HIRS/3) on the Advanced TIROS-N (ATN) NOAA K-N series of polar orbiting meteorological satellites is a 20-channel, step-scanned, visible and IR spectrometer designed to provide atmospheric temperature and moisture profiles. The HIRS/3 instrument is basically identical to the HIRS/2 flown on previous spacecraft except for changes in six spectral bands to improve the sounding accuracy. The HIRS/3 is used to derive water vapor, ozone, and cloud liquid water content. The instrument scans 49.5° on either side of the orbital track with a ground resolution at nadir of 17.4 km. The instrument produces 56 IFOVs for each 1,125 km scan line at 42 km between IFOVs along-track. The instrument consists of 19 IR and 1 visible channel centered at 14.95, 14.71, 14.49, 14.22, 13.97, 13.64, 13.35, 11.11, 9.71, 12.45, 7.33, 6.52, 4.57, 4.52, 4.47, 4.45, 4.13, 4.0, 3.76, and 0.69 μm.

=== Advanced Microwave Sounding Unit (AMSU-A) ===
The AMSU is a new instrument on the Advanced TIROS-N (ATN) NOAA K-N series of operational meteorological satellites. The AMSU consists of two functionally independent units, AMSU-A and AMSU-B. The AMSU-A is a line-scan instrument designed to measure scene radiance in 15 channels, ranging from 23.8 to 89 GHz, to derive atmospheric temperature profiles from the Earth's surface to about 3 millibar pressure height. The instrument is a total power system having a field of view (FOV) of 3.3° at half-power points. The antenna provides cross track scan 50 degrees on either side of the orbital track at nadir with a total of 30 IFOVs per scan line. The AMSU-A is calibrated on-board using a blackbody and space as references. The AMSU-A is physically divided into two separate modules which interface independently with the spacecraft.

Channel	Frequency (GHz)	Module
1	23.8 GHz	AMSU-A2
2	31.4 GHz	AMSU-A2
3	50.3 GHz	AMSU-A1
4	52.8 GHz	AMSU-A1
5	53.596 GHz	AMSU-A1
6	54.4 GHz	AMSU-A1
7	54.94 GHz	AMSU-A1
8	55.5 GHz	AMSU-A1
9	57.29 GHz	AMSU-A1
10	57.29 GHz	AMSU-A1
11	57.29 GHz	AMSU-A1
12	57.29 GHz	AMSU-A1
13	57.29 GHz	AMSU-A1
14	57.29 GHz	AMSU-A1
15	89.0 GHz	AMSU-A1

== Advanced Microwave Sounding Unit 1 (AMSU-A1) ==
The AMSU-A1 is the primary module of the AMSU-A instrument, containing 13 channels that operate between 50 and 90 GHz. It includes 12 oxygen absorption channels for temperature sounding and one 89 GHz window channel for surface information. The first AMSU-A was launched on May 13, 1998, aboard NOAA-15, and has since flown on multiple NOAA satellites as well as NASA's Aqua and EUMETSAT's MetOp series.

== Advanced Microwave Sounding Unit A2 (AMSU-A2) ==
The AMSU-A2 module is the second component of AMSU-A, containing just two low-frequency channels at 23.8 GHz and 31.4 GHz. These channels measure surface temperature and atmospheric moisture, including total precipitable water and cloud liquid water content. The A2 module was developed by Northrop Grumman and works alongside AMSU-A1 to provide complete atmospheric sounding data from different altitudes.

=== Advanced Microwave Sounding Unit (AMSU-B) ===
Channel	Frequency	Bandwidth (MHz)	Purpose
16	89.00 GHz	<6000	Window channel (surface)
17	150.00 GHz	<4000	Window channel (surface)
18	183.31 GHz	500	Water vapor line
19	183.31 GHz	1000	Water vapor line
20	183.31 GHz	2000	Water vapor line

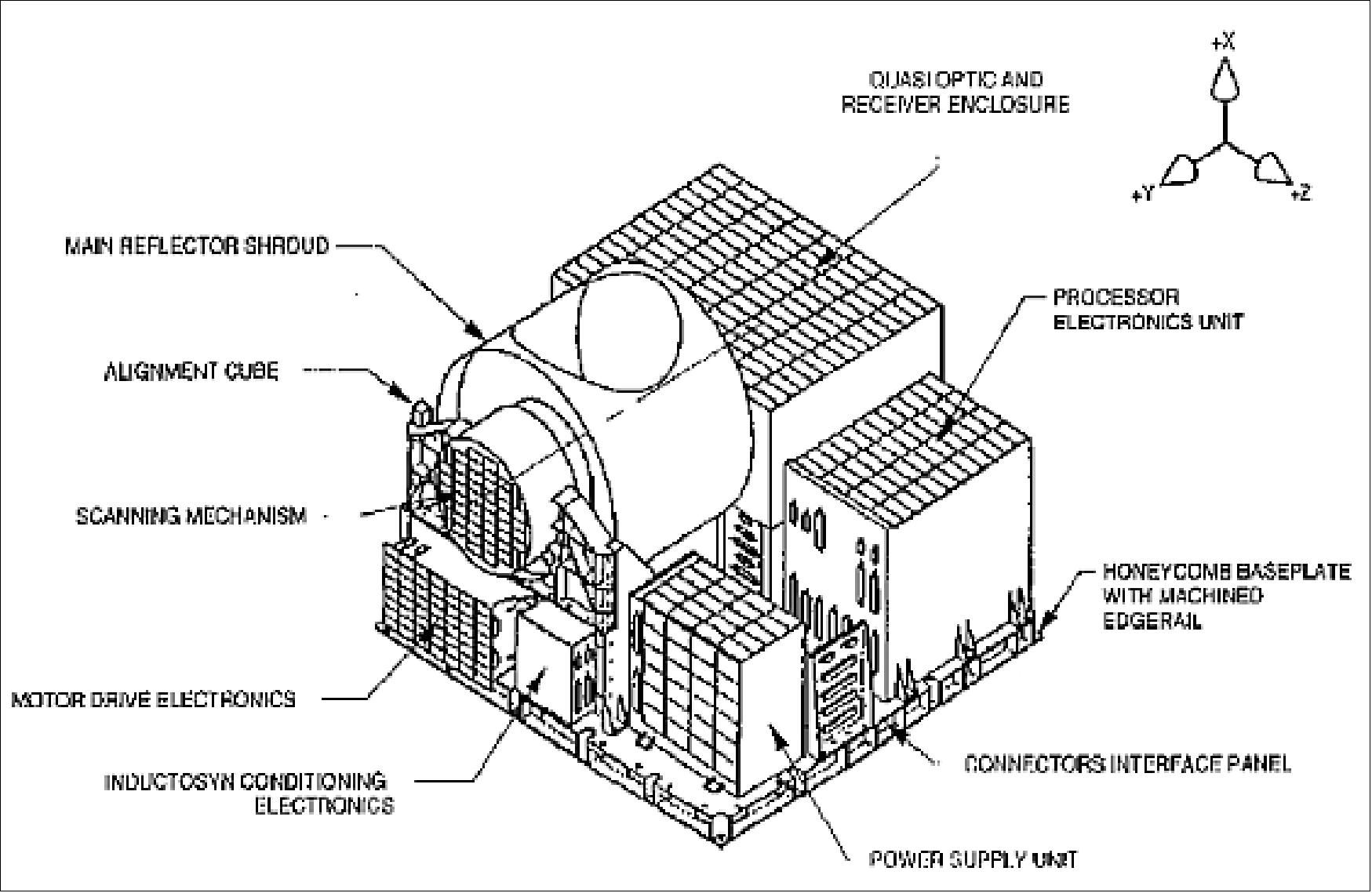
A diagram of the AMSU-B instrument

The AMSU is a new instrument on the Advanced TIROS-N (ATN) NOAA K-N series of operational meteorological satellites. The AMSU consists of two functionally independent units, AMSU-A and AMSU-B. The AMSU-B is a line-scan instrument designed to measure scene radiance in five channels, ranging from 89 GHz to 183 GHz for the computation of atmospheric water vapor profiles. The AMSU-B is a total power system with a FOV of 1.1° at half-power points. The antenna provides a cross-track scan, scanning 50° on either side of the orbital track with 90 IFOVs per scan line at approximately 22.5 scans per minute. One scan line is completed in 2.67 seconds. On-board calibration is accomplished with blackbody targets and space as references. The AMSU-B channels at the center frequency (GHz) are: 90, 157, and 3 channels at 183.31, providing a nominal horizontal resolution at nadir of approximately 16 kilometers. However, the footprint size increases significantly at the edges of the scan swath, reaching resolutions between 50 and 150 kilometers depending on scan angle.

=== Space Environment Monitor (SEM-2) ===
The SEM-2 on the Advanced TIROS-N (ATN) NOAA K-N series of polar orbiting meteorological satellites provides measurements to determine the population of the Earth's radiation belts and data on charged particle precipitation in the upper atmosphere as a result of solar activity. The SEM-2 consists of two separate sensors the Total Energy Detector (TED) and the Medium Energy Proton/Electron Detector (MEPED). In addition, the SEM-2 includes a common Data Processing Unit (DPU). The TED uses eight programmed swept electrostatic curved-plate analyzers to select particle type and energy and Channeltron detectors to measure the instensity in the selected energy bands. The particle energies range from 50 eV to 20 keV. The MEPED detects protons, electrons, and ions with energies from 30 keV to several tens of MeV. The MEPED consists of four directional solid-state detector telescopes and four omnidirectional sensors. The DPU sorts and counts the events and the results are multiplexed and incorporated into the satellite telemetry system. Once received on the ground, the SEM-2 data is separated from the rest of the data and sent to the NOAA Space Environment Laboratory in Boulder, Colorado, for processing and dissemination.

=== Solar Backscatter Ultraviolet Radiometer (SBUV/2) ===
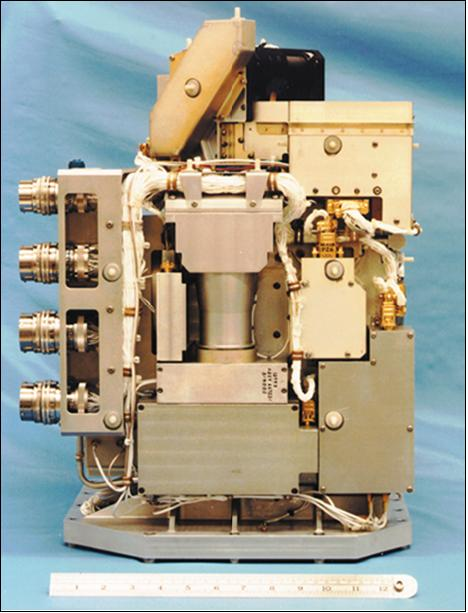
An image of the SBUV instrument

The SBUV/2 on the Advanced TIROS-N (ATN) NOAA K-N series of polar orbiting meteorological satellites is a dual monochromator ultraviolet grating spectrometer for stratospheric ozone measurements. The SBUV/2 is designed to measure scene radiance and solar spectral irradiance in the ultraviolet spectral range from 160 to 406 nm. Measurements are made in discrete mode or sweep mode. In discrete mode, measurements are made in 12 spectral bands from which the total ozone and vertical distribution of ozone are derived. In the sweep mode, a continuous spectral scan from 160 to 406 nm is made primarily for computation of ultraviolet solar spectral irradiance. The 12 spectral channels are (nm): 252.0, 273.61, 283.1, 287.7, 292,29, 297.59, 301.97, 305.87, 312.57, 317.56, 331.26, and 339.89.

=== Search and Rescue Satellite Aided Tracking System (SARSAT) ===
The SARSAT on the Advanced TIROS-N NOAA K-N series of polar orbiting meteorological satellites is designed to detect and locate Emergency Locator Transmitters (ELTs) and Emergency Position-Indicating Radio Beacons (EPIRB). The SARSAT instrumentation consists of two elements: the Search and Rescue Repeater (SARR) and the Search and Rescue Processor (SARP-2). The SARR is a radiofrequency (RF) system that accepts signals from emergency ground transmitters at three very high frequency (VHF/UHF) ranges (121.5 MHz, 243 MHz and 406.05 MHz) and translates, multiplexes, and transmits these signals at L-band frequency (1.544 GHz) to local Search and Rescue stations (LUTs or Local User Terminals) on the ground. The location of the transmitter is determined by retrieving the Doppler information in the relayed signal at the LUT. The SARP-2 is a receiver and processor that accepts digital data from emergency ground transmitters at UHF and demodulates, processes, stores, and relays the data to the SARR where they are combined with the three SARR signals and transmitted via L-band frequency to local stations.

=== ARGOS Data Collection System (DCS-2 - Argos) ===
The DCS-2 on the Advanced TIROS-N (ATN) NOAA K-N series of polar orbiting meteorological satellites is a random-access system for the collection of meteorological data from in situ platforms (moveable and fixed). The ARGOS DCS-2 collects telemetry data using a one-way RF link from data collection platforms (such as buoys, free-floating balloons and remote weather stations) and processes the inputs for on-board storage and later transmission from the spacecraft. For free-floating platforms, the DCS-2 system determines the position to within 5 to 8 km RMS and velocity to an accuracy of 1.0 to 1.6 mps RMS. The DCS-2 measures the in-coming signal frequency and time. The formatted data are stored on the satellite for transmission to NOAA stations. The DCS-2 data is stripped from the GAC data by NOAA/NESDIS and sent to the Argos center at CNES in France for processing, distribution to users, and archival.

== Telecommunications ==
The TIP formats low bit rate instruments and telemetry to tape recorders and direct read-out. The MIRP process high data rate AVHRR to tape recorders (GAC) and direct read-out (HRPT and LAC). On-board recorders can store 110 minutes of GAC, 10 minutes HRPT and 250 minutes TIP.

== Mission ==
The Automatic Picture Transmission (APT) transmission frequency is 137.62 MHz. Due to problems with the S-band transmitter high-gain antennas, NOAA-15 has been configured for High-Resolution Picture Transmission (HRPT) using the S-Band Transmitter #2 (1702.5 MHz) omnidirectional antenna. Issues with antennas were attributed to thermal stress causing internal component breakage.

=== Failure of the AVHRR scanning motor ===
On 22 July 2019, NOAA-15 began transmitting corrupt data. The cause appears to be instability of the scanning motor for the AVHRR sensor. According to an official release from NOAA, on 23 July 2019 at 04:00 UTC, the current draw of that motor spiked, as did the motor temperature. Additionally, the sensor stopped producing data. NOAA says this is consistent with a motor stall, and could be permanent. On 25 July 2019, the AVHRR motor spontaneously recovered. On 30 July 2019, the AVHRR motor suffered another failure consistent with motor stall. As per the previous statement by NOAA, recovery is unlikely:

As of ~00:00 UTC on 30 July 2019 (Day of year (DOY) 211), the AVHRR motor current has once again started spiking, becoming saturated above 302 mA at ~06:00 UTC. The instrument is once again no longer producing data and may be stalled. The current plan is to leave the instrument powered as this issue may be intermittent.

The AVHRR was operating nominally and producing quality data until 18 October 2022, when again there was an issue with the AVHRR Scan Motor.

The NOAA-15 AVHRR Scan Motor current began showing signs of instability on Oct 18 at approximately 1800Z, when the current began to gradually rise from about 205 mA to about 250 mA, where it remained until Oct 24. At about 0000Z on Oct 24, the current began rising again throughout the day, peaking at about 302mA on Oct 25. Scan motor temperature began rising about the same time and is currently steady at ~29°C. The instrument is still producing data, but it is highly degraded. This behavior may be a sign of an impending scan motor stall, but requires further investigation. Options for recovery are limited.

The AVHRR was successfully recovered and continued operations as before until decommissioning.

== End of Mission ==
In April 2025, NOAA announced that they would suspend POES data - data from NOAA-15 and NOAA-19 - on June 16, 2025, and decommission NOAA-15 on August 12, 2025.

However, on August 9 NOAA-19 encountered a battery failure and was decommissioned early on August 13. As a result, the decommissioning date of NOAA-15 was extended until the week of August 18. NOAA will not deorbit the satellite. Instead, it has been left in orbit and put into a safe electrical state, with the transmitters shut down. NOAA-15 was ultimately decommissioned on August 19, 2025, on at 20:37 UTC.
