= Humidity Sounder for Brazil =

Science instrument on NASA's Earth Observing System satellite Aqua

The Humidity Sounder for Brazil (HSB) was an instrument launched on NASA's Earth Observing System satellite Aqua launched in May 2002. It was a four-channel passive microwave radiometer, with one channel at 150 GHz and three channels at 183 GHz. It was very similar in design to the AMSU-B instrument, except it lacked the 89 GHz surface sounding channel. It was intended to study profiles of atmospheric water vapor and provide improved input data to the cloud-clearing algorithms in the Unified AIRS Retrieval Suite, but the scan mirror motor failed on February 5, 2003. It worked with the Atmospheric Infrared Sounder and AMSU-A to form the AIRS Sounding Suite.

HSB was manufactured by Matra Marconi Space, Limited (MMS), in the United Kingdom under a contract with the Brazilian National Institute for Space Research (INPE).

== Instrument characteristics ==
- Heritage: AMSU-B
- Swath: 1650 km
- Spatial resolution: 13.5 km horizontal at nadir
- Mass: 51 kg
- Duty cycle: 100%
- Power: 56 W
- Data rate: 4.2 kbit/s
- Field of View: ± 49.5 degrees cross-track
- Instrument Instantaneous Field of View: 1.1 degrees circular

Table 1: Radiometric characteristics of the HSB

Channel Number	AMSU-B Channel Number	Frequency (GHz)	Bandwidth (at nadir)	Instrument Sensitivity NEDT (K)
1	16	89.9 ± 0.9	DELETED	DELETED
2	17	150 ± 0.9	4000	0.68
3	18	183.31 ± 1.00	2x500	0.57
4	19	183.31 ± 3.00	2x1000	0.39
5	20	183.31 ± 7.00	2x2000	0.30

== History ==
HSB stopped scanning suddenly and without warning over the Pacific Ocean February 5, 2003 at 21:39 UTC. The most likely cause is an electrical failure in the scan electronics. By design AMSU-B and therefore HSB had very limited hardware redundancy and software update capability.
