= High-resolution picture transmission =

An HRPT Image from a NOAA Satellite

Live Weather satellite pictures are often broadcast as high-resolution picture transmissions (HRPTs), color high-resolution picture transmissions (CHRPTs) for Chinese weather satellite transmissions, or advanced high-resolution picture transmissions (AHRPTs) for EUMETSAT weather satellite transmissions. HRPT transmissions are generally available around the world and are currently transmitted from some polar orbiting weather satellites.

Broadcast signal
The working frequency band for HRPT is L Band at 1.670–1.710 GHz and the modulation type is BPSK. On NOAA KLM satellites the transmission power is 6.35 Watts, or 38.03 dBm. The METEOR-M series of satellites uses a similar format to HRPT with the same modulation. The METOP satellites broadcast with a bandwidth of 4.5 MHz, these use QPSK and AHRPT.

== Reception ==
=== Hardware ===
In order to receive HRPT transmissions a high gain antenna is required, such as a small satellite dish, a helical antenna, or a crossed yagi. Basic reception equipment includes a parabolic dish antenna attached to an Azimuth-Elevation unit. The HRPT signal is further enhanced with a 1.7 GHz pre-amplifier. An HRPT receiver unit and a dish tracking controller are required to steer the Azimuth-Elevation unit controlling the parabolic dish. As an alternative to receiving direct broadcast from polar orbiting satellites, users in Europe and Africa can also receive rebroadcast data from the EUMETSAT EUMETCAST service via Digital Video Broadcasting using a simple stationary satellite dish.

=== Software ===
Both commercial and free software for demodulating HRPT transmission signals exists: Example of commercial demodulation software is XHRPT Decoder. Free software exists as a part of GNURadio package, the GR-NOAA blocks and flowcharts distributed by Manuel Bülo.

Free software for decoding data packets contained in HRPT is available, for example SatDump, DWDSAT HRPT Viewer V1.1.0 or AAPP with Satpy.

== Satellite status ==
Organization	Satellite Name	Orbit	Service	Frequency	Data rate	Status
NOAA	NOAA-15	Polar	HRPT	1702.5 MHz	0.665Mbps	Offline
NOAA	NOAA-18	Polar	HRPT	1707.0 MHz	0.665Mbps	Offline
NOAA	NOAA-19	Polar	HRPT	1698.0 MHz	0.665Mbps	Offline
EUMETSAT	Metop-A	Polar	AHRPT	1701.3 MHz	4.66Mbps	Offline
EUMETSAT	Metop-B	Polar	AHRPT	1701.3 MHz	4.66Mbps	Transmitting
EUMETSAT	Metop-C	Polar	AHRPT	1701.3 MHz	4.66Mbps	Transmitting
CMA	Fengyun 3A	Sun-synchronous	AHRPT	1704.5 MHz	4.2Mbps	Offline
CMA	Fengyun 3B	Sun-synchronous	AHRPT	1704.5 MHz	4.2Mbps	Offline
CMA	Fengyun 3C	Sun-synchronous	AHRPT	1701.3 MHz	4.2Mbps	Offline
RosHydroMet	Meteor-M N2-1	Sun-synchronous	HRPT	1700.0 MHz	0.6654Mbps	Offline
RosHydroMet	Meteor-M N2-2	Sun-synchronous	HRPT	1700.0 MHz	0.6654Mbps	Offline
RosHydroMet	Meteor-M N2-3	Sun-synchronous	HRPT	1700.0 MHz	0.6654Mbps	Transmitting
RosHydroMet	Meteor-M N2-4	Sun-synchronous	HRPT	1700.0 MHz	0.6654Mbps	Transmitting
