= Argos (satellite system) =

System for collecting electronic environmental data

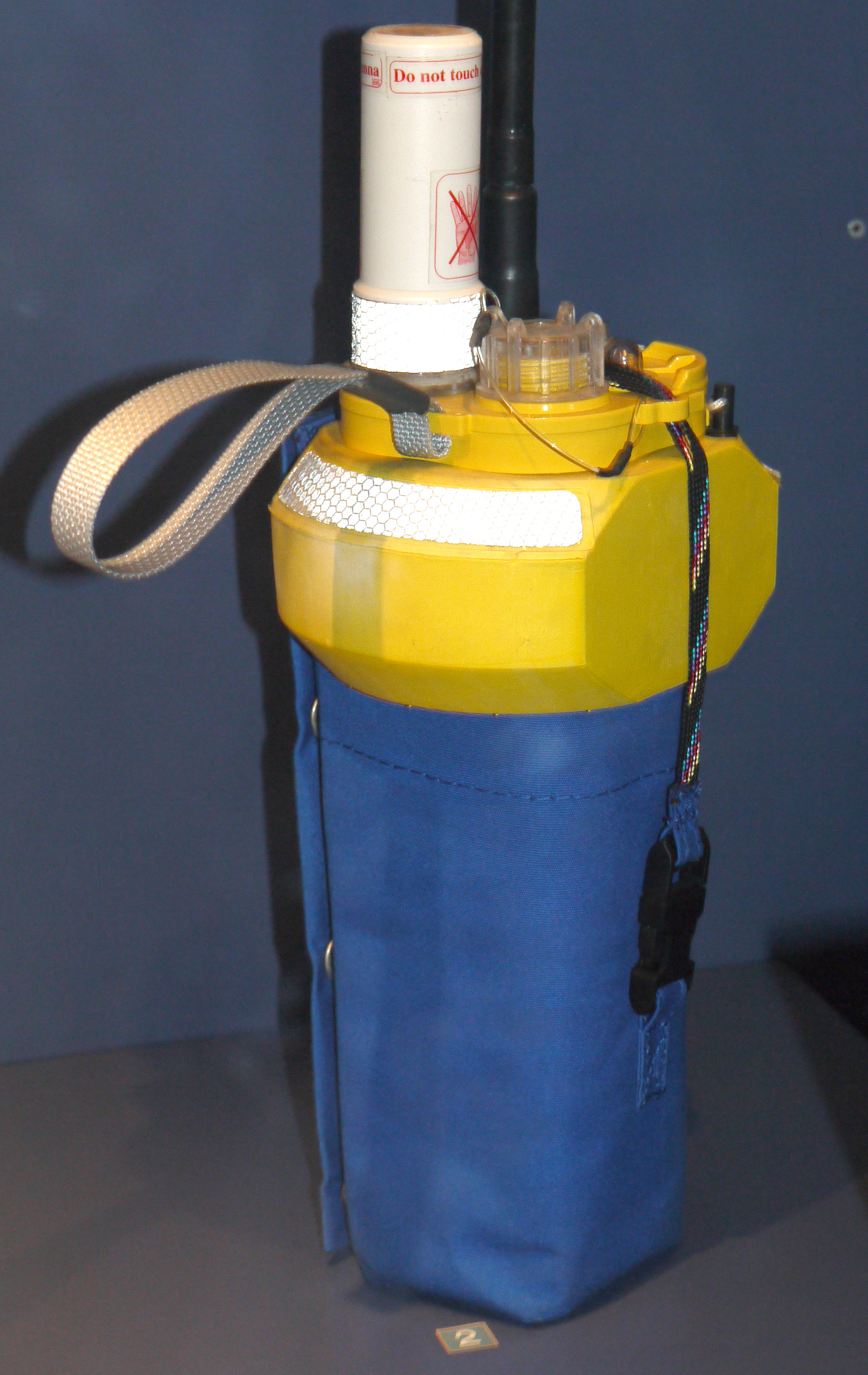
An Argos Seabeacon buoy

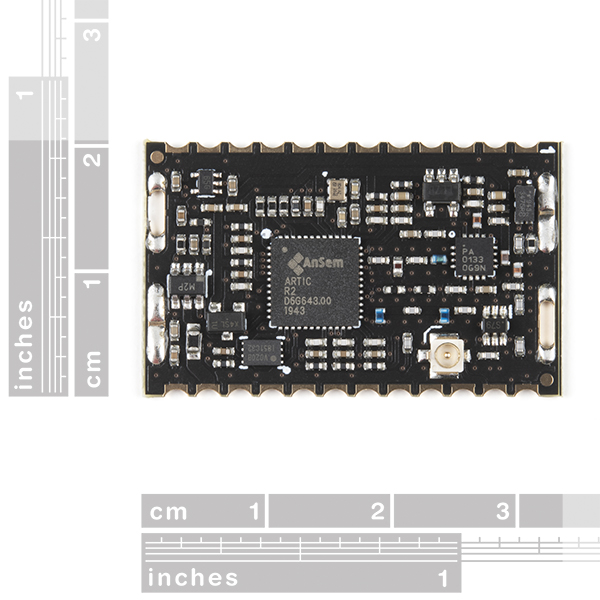
ARGOS transceiver

Argos is a global satellite-based system that collects, processes, and disseminates (spreads, distributes) environmental data from fixed and mobile platforms around the world. The worldwide tracking and environmental monitoring system is the results from Franco-American cooperation. In addition to satellite data collection, the main feature of the Argos system is its ability to geographically locate the data source from any location on Earth using the Doppler effect; which refers to the apparent change in the wavelength due to relative motion between its source and observer. Argos is operated by CLS, based in Toulouse, France, and its United States subsidiary, Woods Hole Group.

== History and utilization ==
Argos was established in 1978 and has provided data to environmental research and protection groups. It is a component of many global research programs including the Tropical Ocean-Global Atmosphere program (TOGA), Tagging of Pacific Pelagics (TOPP), World Ocean Circulation Experiment (WOCE) and, Argo. There are 22,000 active transmitters (8,000 of which are used in animal tracking) in over 100 countries.

Since the late 1980s, Argos transmitters have been deployed on a large number of marine mammals and sea turtles, and it is used for tracking long-distance movements of both coastal and oceanic species.

Argos was developed under a Memorandum of Understanding (MOU) between the Centre National d'Études Spatiales (CNES, France), the National Aeronautics and Space Administration (NASA, United States) and the National Oceanic and Atmospheric Administration (NOAA, United States).

The system utilizes both ground and satellite-based resources to accomplish its mission. These include:

- instruments carried aboard the NOAA Polar Operational Environmental Satellites (POES), the European Organisation for the Exploitation of Meteorological Satellites (EUMETSAT) Metop satellites, and Indian Space Research Organisation (ISRO) satellites,
- receiving stations around the world
- major processing facilities in Toulouse in France and Lanham, Maryland in the United States.

Since June 2019, a new subsidiary named Kinéis has taken over operations and plans to launch a constellation of 16U CubeSats in 2022. In June 2024, the first of these Cubesats were launched on a Rocket Lab Electron launch vehicle named "No Time Toulouse". On 20 September 2024, the second batch of five Cubesats were launched on electron launch number 53 named "Kinéis Killed The RadIoT Star", see List of Electron launches.

== Operating agencies ==
The Argos satellite-based system was set up by:

- The Centre National d'Études Spatiales (CNES).
- The U.S. National Oceanic and Atmospheric Administration (NOAA).
- The U.S. National Aeronautics and Space Administration (NASA).

Recent partners in this international cooperative venture are:

- The European Organisation for the Exploitation of Meteorological Satellites (EUMETSAT).
- The Indian Space Research Organisation (ISRO).

== Frequencies and data transfer ==
Most use of the Argos System makes use of one-way data transmission on 401.65 MHz using Argos 2. Each Argos platform features a unique 28-bit ID and the ability to transmit a short 3 to 31 byte message for each transmission. Each platform is restricted to a specified interval, such as every 60 seconds, allowing for a few hundred bytes total per satellite pass. This is enough to contain a couple elements of geographic coordinates or other sensor data. Argos 1 is no longer supported. In order to determine transmitter position using Doppler shift on a single satellite accurately, approximately 4-6 transmissions are required in succession during a satellite pass. Accuracy can vary between several hundred meters to several kilometers.

The Argos 3 system uses a downlink signal at 465.9875 MHz. However, due to ground-based alarm system interference issues in the United States, the downlink was disabled on the NOAA-19 satellite. Other newer satellites still transmit on this frequency. The downlink contains date and time, Argos System satellite ephemeris data, and the downlink portion of the two-way communication link.

Data collected from the Argos System is transmitted to the ground using two possible methods. If an Argos System ground receiving station is in view of the satellite while the transmitter is also in view, the data is transmitted and processed in near real time. If a ground station is not in view or operational, data is additionally transmitted from the satellite to one of several polar based ground stations. This introduces additional delay in receiving messages.

== Satellite constellation ==
The Argos System is served by 9 polar orbiting satellites at an altitude of 850 km and completes a revolution around Earth approximately every 100 minutes. At a vantage point of 850 km, satellites cover approximately 5000 km^{2} of Earth. Each satellite was intended to be Sun-synchronous, with passes almost at the same solar time each day. Although, due to the age of some satellites, minor drifting does occur.

The polar orbits of the Argos satellite constellation ensure global (100%) Earth coverage. Since orbital pass overlap increases with latitude, the number of daily passes over a transmitter also increases toward the poles.

Argos satellites in operation
Satellite Name	Launch Date	Operational Status	Abbreviation	Downlink Enabled
NOAA-15	13 May 1998	Decommissioned June 2025	NK	N/A
NOAA-18	20 May 2005	Decommissioned June 2025	NN	N/A
NOAA-19	6 February 2009	Decommissioned June 2025	NP	No
METOP-B	17 November 2012	Operational	MB	No
METOP-C	7 November 2018	Operational	MC	Yes
SARAL	13 February 2013	Operational	SR	Yes
ANGELS	18 December 2019	Decommissioned (since 2024)	A1	Yes
Gazelle	7 October 2022	Operational		Yes

== See also ==
- ICARUS Initiative
- Data collection satellite
- DORIS (satellite)
- Transit (satellite), which also used Doppler navigation, but with satellite transmitters and ground-based receivers
