= Advanced microwave sounding unit =

Instrument installed on meteorological satellites

The advanced microwave sounding unit (AMSU) is a multi-channel microwave radiometer installed on meteorological satellites. The instrument examines several bands of microwave radiation from the atmosphere to perform atmospheric sounding of temperature and moisture levels.

Flooding from Hurricane Isidore shown by AMSU channel 2

== Products ==
Level-1 radiance data are calibrated brightness temperatures.

Level-2 geophysical data from AMSU include:

- Temperature profile from 3 mbar (45 km) to the surface
- Water vapor profiles
- Snow and ice coverage
- Cloud liquid water
- Rain Rate

AMSU data is also used together with infrared radiances from HIRS, AIRS, or IASI to produce blended MW/IR level-2 geophysical products such as:

- Temperature profiles
- Water vapor profiles
- Ozone
- Cloud properties
- Cloud-cleared IR radiances

== Applications ==
AMSU data is used extensively in weather prediction. Brightness temperatures are processed as quickly as possible and sent to numerical weather prediction (NWP) centers around the world. This data helps keep the assessment of the current state of the atmosphere correct, which in turn helps make predictions more accurate.

Long-term AMSU records are also used in studies of climate.

== History ==
AMSU-A + AMSU-B have flown together on the 3 NOAA KLM satellites: NOAA-15 (NOAA K), launched May 13, 1998; NOAA-16 (NOAA L), launched September 21, 2000; and NOAA-17 (NOAA M), launched June 24, 2002.

For NOAA-18 (NOAA N), launched May 20, 2005, AMSU-B was replaced by a similar instrument, the Microwave Humidity Sounder (MHS).

Versions of AMSU-A also fly on the NASA Aqua Earth science satellite and the EUMETSAT MetOp series. On these spacecraft, AMSU-B is replaced by similar microwave humidity sounders: HSB for Aqua and MHS for MetOp.

The AMSU was an improvement of the Microwave Sounding Unit (MSU), incorporating capabilities of the Stratospheric Sounding Unit (SSU), both of which had flown on TIROS-N in 1978 and continued on the NOAA-6 through NOAA-14 satellites. The next generation in the family is the Advanced Technology Microwave Sounder (ATMS), first flown on Suomi-NPP in 2011 and now standard equipment on the JPSS series of satellites, the first of which, NOAA-20, launched in 2017.

AMSUs were manufactured by Aerojet Corporation in Azusa, California. This organization is now part of Northrop Grumman Electronic Systems.

== Observation geometry ==
It is preferred that AMSUs always situated on polar-orbiting satellites in Sun-synchronous orbits, however NOAA-15 to NOAA-19 all had drifting LTANs. In the case of Metops and EOS Aqua this results in their crossing the equator at the same two local solar times every orbit. For example, EOS Aqua crosses the equator in daylight heading north (ascending) at 1:30 pm solar time and in darkness heading south (descending) at 1:30 am solar time.

The AMSU instruments scan continuously in a "whisk broom" mode. During about 6 seconds of each 8-second observation cycle, AMSU-A makes 30 observations at 3.3° steps from −48° to +48°. It then makes observations of a warm calibration target and of cold space before it returns to its original position for the start of the next scan. In these 8 seconds the subsatellite point moves about 45 km, so the next scan will be 45 km further along the track. AMSU-B meanwhile makes 3 scans of 90 observations each, with a spacing of 1.1°.

During any given 24-hour period there are approximately 14 orbits. Almost the entire globe is observed in either daylight or nighttime mode, many in both. Polar regions are observed nearly every 100 minutes.

== Instrument characteristics ==
The AMSU has two sub-instruments, AMSU-A and AMSU-B. AMSU-A has 15 channels between 23.8 and 89 GHz, and is used primarily for measuring atmospheric temperatures (known as "temperature sounding"). It has a ground resolution near nadir of 45 km. AMSU-B, with five channels between 89 and 183.3 GHz, has a spatial resolution near nadir of 15 km and is primarily intended for moisture sounding. Spot size of both sub-instruments becomes larger and more elongated toward the edges of the swath. When the two instruments are used together, there are roughly 9 AMSU-B fields-of-view in a 3x3 array corresponding to each AMSU-A field-of-view. This reflects the higher spatial variability of water vapor compared to temperature. HIRS/3 infrared sounders with the same spatial resolution as AMSU-B are also included on NOAA 15–17 satellites and are used together with AMSU-A and AMSU-B. Together the three instruments form ATOVS, the Advanced TIROS Operational Vertical Sounder.

The Aqua and MetOp AMSU-A instruments are 15-channel microwave sounders designed primarily to obtain temperature profiles in the upper atmosphere (especially the stratosphere) and to provide a cloud-filtering capability for tropospheric temperature observations. The EOS AMSU-A is part of a closely coupled triplet of instruments that include the AIRS and HSB. The MetOp AMSU-A similarly works with HIRS, IASI, and MHS. MHS and HSB are variants on AMSU-B.

- Heritage: Microwave Sounding Unit (MSU)
- Swath: 1650 km
- Footprint size: for a nominal spacecraft altitude of 833 km, 48 km at nadir (AMSU-A), 16 km at nadir (AMSU-B).
- Mass: 100 kg
- Duty cycle: 100%
- Power: 125 W
- Data Rate: 3.2 kbit/s
- Max scan angle: ±49.5°
- Instrument Instantaneous FOV: 3.3° (AMSU-A) 1.1° (AMSU-B)

Table 1 Radiometric characteristics of the AMSU-A (from 3,5).

Channel Number
Frequency

(GHz)

Polarization

(at nadir)

Number

of Bands

Instrument Sensitivity

NEDT (K)

Primary Function

1
23.8
vertical
1
0.30
Water Vapor Burden
2
31.4
vertical
1
0.30
Water Vapor Burden
3
50.3
vertical
1
0.40
Water Vapor Burden
4
52.8
vertical
1
0.25
Water Vapor Burden
5
53.596 ± 0.115
horizontal
2
0.25
Tropospheric Temperature
6
54.4
horizontal
1
0.25
Tropospheric Temperature
7
54.94
vertical
1
0.25
Tropospheric Temperature
8
55.5
horizontal
1
0.25
Tropospheric Temperature
9
57.290
horizontal
1
0.25
Stratospheric Temperature
10
57.290 ± 0.217
horizontal
2
0.40
Stratospheric Temperature
11
57.290 ± 0.3222 ± 0.048
horizontal
4
0.40
Stratospheric Temperature
12
57.290 ± 0.3222 ± 0.022
horizontal
4
0.60
Stratospheric Temperature
13
57.290 ± 0.3222 ± 0.010
horizontal
4
0.80
Stratospheric Temperature
14
57.290 ± 0.3222 ± 0.0045
horizontal
4
1.20
Stratospheric Temperature
15
89.0
vertical
1
0.50
Cloud Top/Snow

Table 2 Radiometric characteristics of the AMSU-B (from 4).

Channel Number
Frequency

(GHz)

Polarization

(at nadir)

Number

of bands

Instrument Sensitivity

NEDT (K)

16
89.9 ± 0.9
vertical
2
0.37
17
150 ± 0.9
vertical
2
0.84
18
183.31 ± 1.00
vertical
2
1.06
19
183.31 ± 3.00
vertical
2
0.70
20
183.31 ± 7.00
vertical
2
0.60
