= Polar Operational Environmental Satellites =

Weather satellite constellation

The Polar-orbiting Operational Environmental Satellites (POES) were a constellation of polar orbiting weather satellites funded by the National Oceanic and Atmospheric Administration (NOAA) and the European Organisation for the Exploitation of Meteorological Satellites (EUMETSAT) with the intent of improving the accuracy and detail of weather analysis and forecasting. The spacecraft were provided by NASA and the European Space Agency (ESA), and NASA's Goddard Space Flight Center oversaw the manufacture, integration and test of the NASA-provided TIROS satellites. The first polar-orbiting weather satellite launched as part of the POES constellation was the Television Infrared Observation Satellite-N (TIROS-N), which was launched on 13 October 1978. The final spacecraft, NOAA-19 (NOAA-N Prime), was launched on 6 February 2009. The ESA-provided MetOp satellite operated by EUMETSAT utilize POES-heritage instruments for the purpose of data continuity.

On-orbit satellite operations of POES were performed by NOAA's Office of Satellite and Product Operations (OSPO).

On 19 August 2025, the final POES satellite (NOAA-15) was decommissioned and removed from service. The Joint Polar Satellite System, which was launched on 18 November 2017, is the successor to the POES Program.

== Daily global coverage ==
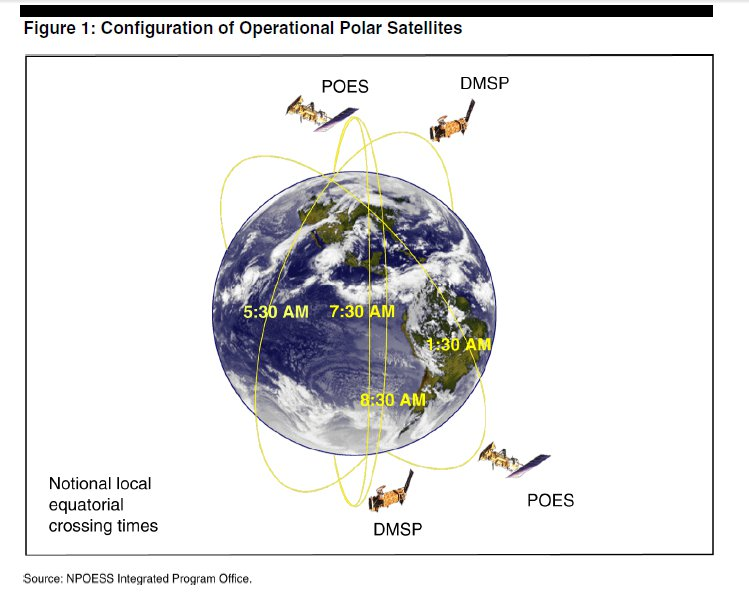
Notational local equatorial crossing times, showing POES (and other) satellites.

Each POES satellite completes roughly 14.1 orbits per day. Since the number of orbits per day is not an integer, the ground tracks do not repeat on a daily basis. The system includes both morning and afternoon satellites which provide global coverage four times daily.

== Applications ==
Data from the POES support a broad range of environmental monitoring applications including weather analysis and forecasting, climate research and prediction, global sea surface temperature measurements, atmospheric soundings of temperature and humidity, ocean dynamics research, volcanic eruption monitoring, forest fire detection, global vegetation analysis, search and rescue, and many other applications.

One of the key instruments of the POES system is the High Resolution Infrared Radiation Sounder (HIRS/4). HIRS/4 senses within 20 channels ranging from visible bands to long wave infrared (0.69-14.96 micron wavelengths), to sense variation of temperature, humidity, and pressures within the atmosphere. The data collected from HIRS/4 is collaboratively used with the Advanced Microwave Sounding Unit (AMSU) to advance research in sea surface temperatures, cloud coverage analysis, ozone concentrations throughout the atmosphere and earth's radiance.

== SARSAT ==
POES has been used by the Search and Rescue community since 1982. COSPAS-SARSAT is the international humanitarian Search and Rescue Satellite-Aided Tracking System that is responsible for alerting and locating information to search and rescue authorities. COSPAS-SARSAT satellites detect 406 MHz distress signals at all times from nearly any place on the globe. Each 406 MHz beacon has a unique fifteen digit identification (ID) code embedded within its signal which allows rescuers to have an identification of the party in distress before they head out on the rescue. There is no charge for this service provided in conjunction with National Oceanic and Atmospheric Administration (NOAA) and SARSAT.

== Mission ==
- TIROS-N - Launched on 13 October 1978. Deactivated on 27 February 1981.
- NOAA-6 - Launched on 27 June 1979. Deactivated on 31 March 1987.
- NOAA-B - Launched on 29 May 1980. Deorbited on 31 May 1981.
- NOAA-7 - Launched on 23 June 1981. Deactivated in June 1986.
- NOAA-8 - Launched on 28 March 1983. Deactivated on 9 January 1986.
- NOAA-9 - Launched on 12 December 1984. Deactivated on 13 February 1998.
- NOAA-10 - Launched on 17 September 1986. Deactivated on 30 August 2001.
- NOAA-11 - Launched on 24 September 1988. Deactivated on 16 June 2004.
- NOAA-12 - Launched on 14 May 1991. Deactivated on 10 August 2007.
- NOAA-13 - Launched on 9 August 1993. Failure after 12 days (21 August 1993).
- NOAA-14 - Launched on 30 December 1994. Deactivated on 23 May 2007.
- NOAA-15 - Launched on 13 May 1998. Deactivated on 19 August 2025.
- NOAA-16 - Launched on 21 September 2000. Deactivated on 9 June 2014.
- NOAA-17 - Launched on 24 June 2002. Deactivated on 10 April 2013.
- NOAA-18 - Launched on 20 May 2005. Deactivated on 6 June 2025.
- NOAA-19 - Launched on 6 February 2009, the fifth and last in the current series of polar-orbiting satellites. Deactivated on 13 August 2025.

=== MetOp ===
The MetOp missions are not part of POES, but use POES heritage instruments.

- MetOp-A - Launched on 19 October 2006 from Baikonur Cosmodrome, Kazakhstan. Decommissioned by EUMETSAT in Nov 2021.
- MetOp-B - Launched on 17 September 2012 from Baikonur Cosmodrome, Kazakhstan. Still in use.
- MetOp-C - Launched on 7 November 2018 from Kourou, Centre Spatial Guyanais. Still in use.

== See also ==
- NPOESS
- Suomi NPP
- Joint Polar Satellite System
- Geostationary Operational Environmental Satellite
