= NOAA-19 =

American weather satellite (2009–2025)

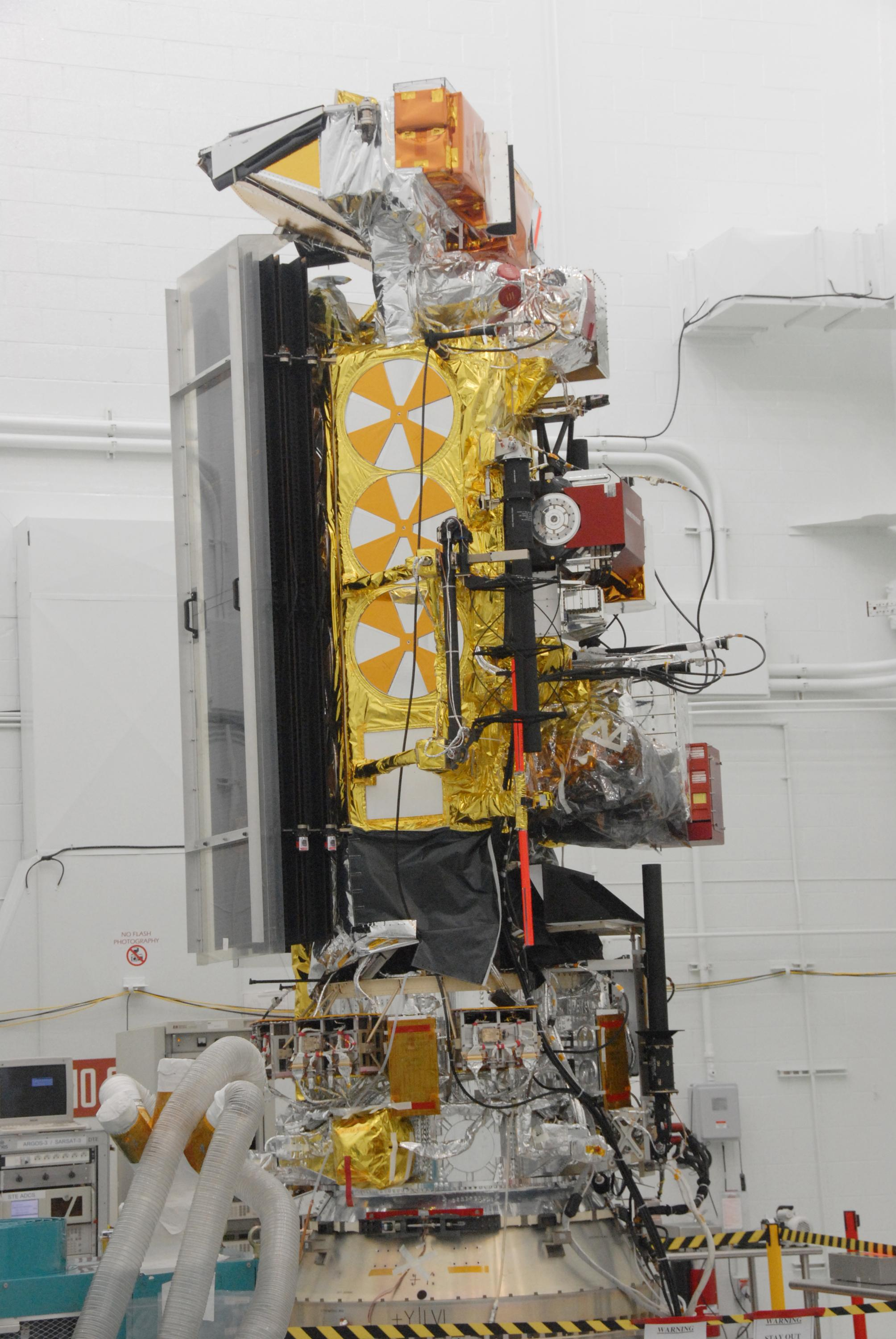
- NOAA-19 before launch
- Names: NOAA-N'; NOAA-N Prime
- Mission type: Weather
- Operator: NOAA
- COSPAR ID: 2009-005A
- SATCAT no.: 33591
- Mission duration: 2 years (planned); 16 years, 6 months, 7 days (achieved)

Spacecraft properties
- Spacecraft type: TIROS
- Bus: Advanced TIROS-N
- Manufacturer: Lockheed Martin
- Launch mass: 1,440 kg (3,170 lb)
- Dimensions: 4.19 m (13.7 ft) of long 1.88 m (6 ft 2 in) of diameter

Start of mission
- Launch date: 6 February 2009, 10:22:00 UTC
- Rocket: Delta II 7320-10C (Delta D338)
- Launch site: Vandenberg, SLC-2W
- Contractor: United Launch Alliance
- Entered service: 6 June 2009

End of mission
- Disposal: Decommissioned
- Deactivated: 16:55 UTC, August 13, 2025

Orbital parameters
- Reference system: Geocentric orbit
- Regime: Sun-synchronous orbit
- Perigee altitude: 846 km (526 mi)
- Apogee altitude: 866 km (538 mi)
- Inclination: 98.70°
- Period: 102.00 minutes
Instruments
- AVHRR/3: Advanced Very High Resolution Radiometer
- HIRS/4: High Resolution Infrared Sounder
- SEM-2: Space Environment Monitor
- Argos ADCS: Advanced Data Collection System
- SARSAT: Search and Rescue Satellite-Aided Tracking System
- SBUV/2: Solar Backscatter Ultraviolet Radiometer
- AMSU-A: Advanced Microwave Sounding Unit
- MHS: Microwave Humidity Sounder

NOAA-19, known as NOAA-N' (NOAA-N Prime) before launch, was the last of the American National Oceanic and Atmospheric Administration (NOAA) series of weather satellites. NOAA-19 was launched on 6 February 2009. NOAA-19 was in an afternoon Sun-synchronous orbit and was launched with the intention that it replace NOAA-18 as the prime afternoon spacecraft, which it did in June 2009.

The satellite was passivated and decommissioned on August 13, 2025 after experiencing a battery failure.

== Launch ==
On 4 November 2008, NASA announced that the satellite had arrived at Vandenberg aboard a Lockheed C-5 Galaxy military transport aircraft. Installation of the payload fairing took place 27 January 2009 and the second stage propellant was loaded on 31 January 2009.

Several attempts were made to conduct the launch. The first attempt, 4 February 2009, was scrubbed after a failure was detected in a launch pad gaseous nitrogen pressurization system. The second attempt, 5 February 2009, was scrubbed after the failure of a payload fairing air conditioning compressor, which is also part of the ground support equipment at the launch pad.

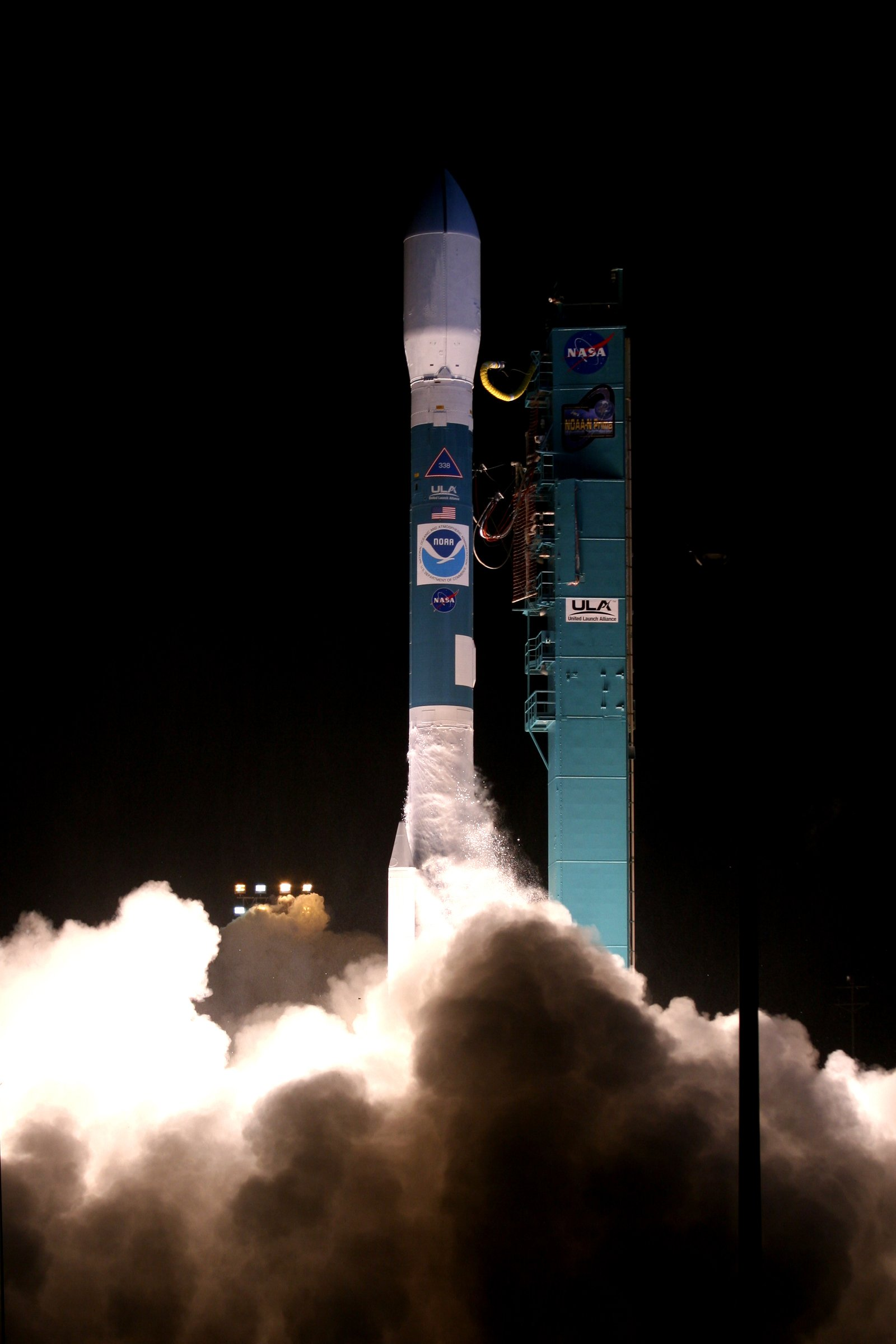
Launch of NOAA-19

The satellite was successfully launched at 10:22 UTC on 6 February 2009 aboard a Delta II flying in the 7320-10C configuration from Vandenberg Air Force Base (VAFB).

== Instruments ==
NOAA-N Prime carries a suite of eight instruments that provides data for weather and climate predictions. Like its predecessors, NOAA-N Prime provides global images of clouds and surface features and vertical profiles of atmospheric temperature and humidity for use in numerical weather and ocean forecast models, as well as data on ozone distribution in the upper part of the atmosphere, and near-Earth space environments — information important for the marine, aviation, power generation, agriculture, and other communities. The NOAA-N Prime primary instruments — the Advanced Very High Resolution Radiometer (AVHRR/3), High Resolution Infrared Radiation Sounder (HIRS/4), and the Advanced Microwave Sounding Unit (AMSU-A) — were all designed for a three-year mission. The Space Environment Monitor (SEM/2) is fitted to the satellite and is composed of Total Energy Detector (TED) and MEPED (Medium Energy Proton and Electron Detector). The Solar Backscatter Ultraviolet Spectral Radiometer (SBUV/2) was designed for a two-year mission, and the Microwave Humidity Sounder (MHS) instrument was designed for a five-year mission. NOAA-19 also hosts Cospas-Sarsat payloads.

=== Advanced Very High Resolution Radiometer (AVHRR/3) ===
The Advanced Very High Resolution Radiometer/3 (AVHRR/3) is the primary imaging system and consists of visible, near infrared (IR) and thermal IR channels. The AVHRR, built by ITT, observes vegetation, clouds, and the surface of bodies of water, shorelines, snow, aerosols and ice. The instrument has a scan mirror that continuously rotates and scans the Earth at six revolutions per second to provide continuous coverage.

=== Solar Backscatter Ultraviolet Radiometer (SBUV/2) ===
The Solar Backscatter Ultraviolet Radiometer/2 (SBUV/2) instrument is both an imager and a sounder. As an imager, it produces total column ozone maps. As a sounder, it obtains and measures the ozone distribution in the atmosphere as a function of altitude. The SBUV, built by Ball Aerospace, is a long-term monitoring device that takes global measurements and observes how elements in the atmosphere change over time. Each channel on the nadir-pointing SBUV detects a particular near-ultraviolet wavelength whose intensity depends on the ozone density at a particular height in the atmosphere. The SBUV includes a Cloud Cover Radiometer that provides information on the amount of cloud cover in an image and removes the effects of the clouds from the data.

=== Microwave Humidity Sounder (MHS) ===
The Microwave Humidity Sounder (MHS), built by EADS Astrium and donated by the European Organisation for the Exploitation of Meteorological Satellites (EUMETSAT), is a five-channel microwave instrument intended primarily to measure profiles of atmospheric humidity.

=== High Resolution Infrared Radiation Sounder (HIRS/4) ===
HIRS/4, built by ITT, has 19 infrared channels and one visible channel. The instrument principally measures carbon dioxide, water and ozone. These measurements allow scientists to determine the amount of each of these gases in the atmosphere and the altitude at which they appear.

=== Advanced Microwave Sounding Unit (AMSU-A) ===
AMSU-A, built by Northrop Grumman, has 15 channels and continuously scans the Earth's surface and the atmosphere, measuring naturally emitted microwave signals radiated by the Earth's surface and atmosphere.

=== Space Environment Monitor (SEM-2) ===
The Space Environment Monitor (SEM-2) was built by Panametrics, now Assurance Technology Corporation. It provides measurements to determine the intensity of the Earth's radiation belts and the flux of charged particles at satellite altitude. The SEM-2 consists of two separate sensor units and a common Data Processing Unit (DPU). The sensor units are the Total Energy Detector (TED) and the Medium Energy Proton and Electron Detector (MEPED).

=== Advanced Data Collection System (ADCS) ===
The Advanced Data Collection System (ADCS), provided by CNES in France, measures environmental factors such as atmospheric temperature and pressure and the velocity and direction of ocean and wind currents. Data is collected from various transmitting devices on platforms (e.g., buoys, free-floating balloons and remote weather stations). Transmitters are even placed on migratory animals, sea turtles, bears, and other animals. Data is transmitted to the spacecraft for storage and subsequent transmission from the satellite to the ground. The stored data is transmitted once per orbit.

=== SARSAT ===
The Search And Rescue Satellite-Aided Tracking (SARSAT) system. The Search and Rescue Repeater (SARR), built by the Department of National Defense in Canada, and the Search and Rescue Processor (SARP), built by Centre National d'Études Spatiales (CNES), detect distress calls sent from emergency beacons on-board aircraft and boats and carried by people in remote areas. The instruments on the spacecraft transmit the data to ground receiving stations or local user terminals where the location of the emergency signals is determined by Doppler processing.

== Damage during manufacture ==
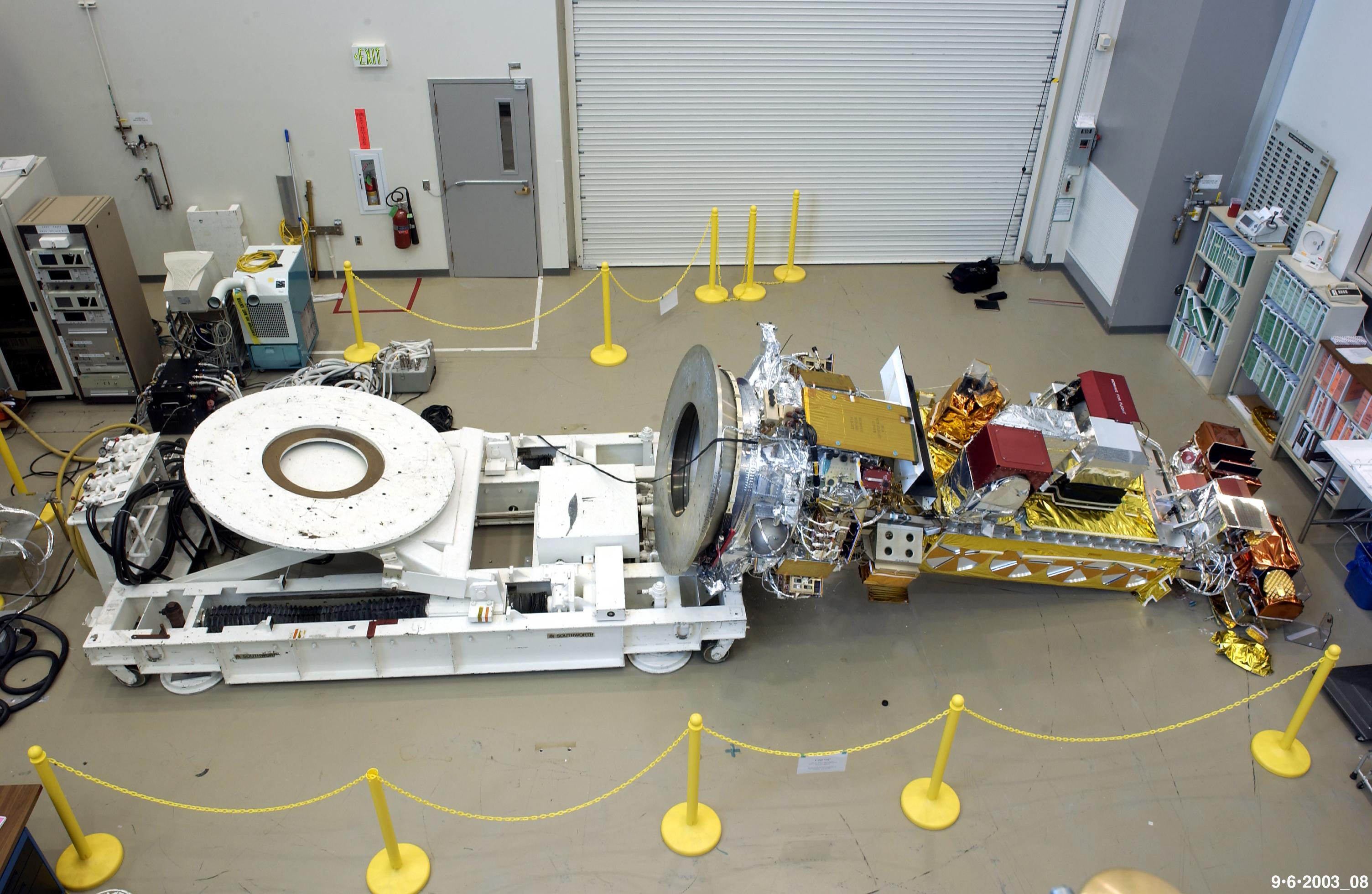
NOAA-N Prime after falling over during construction, on 6 September 2003.

On 6 September 2003 at 15:28 UTC, the satellite was badly damaged while being worked on at the Lockheed Martin Space Systems factory in Sunnyvale, California. The spacecraft fell to the floor as it reached 13° of tilt while being rotated. The satellite fell as a team was turning it from a vertical to a horizontal position. A NASA inquiry into the mishap determined that it was caused by a lack of procedural discipline throughout the facility. While the turn-over cart used during the procedure was in storage, a technician removed twenty-four bolts securing an adapter plate to it without documenting the action. The team subsequently using the cart to turn the satellite failed to check the bolts, as specified in the procedure, before attempting to move the satellite. Repairs to the satellite cost US$135 million. Lockheed Martin agreed to forfeit all profit from the project to help pay for repair costs; they later took a US$30 million charge relating to the incident. The remainder of the repair costs were paid by the United States government.

== Replacement ==
The NOAA series was scheduled to be replaced by a next-generation NPOESS series before that project was cancelled. Instead Suomi NPP was launched in 2011 as a bridge to the Joint Polar Satellite System (JPSS). The first JPSS satellite was launched in 2017.

== End of Mission ==
In April 2025, NOAA announced that they would suspend POES data - data from NOAA-15 and NOAA-19 - on June 16, 2025 and decommission NOAA-19 on August 18, 2025.

On August 9th NOAA-19 encountered a battery failure and was decommissioned early on August 13th at 16:55 UTC NOAA will not deorbit the satellite. Instead, it has been left in orbit and put into a safe electrical state, with the transmitters shut down.
