= Data collection system =

Data collection system (DCS) is a computer application that facilitates the process of data collection, allowing specific, structured information to be gathered in a systematic fashion, subsequently enabling data analysis to be performed on the information. Typically a DCS displays a form that accepts data input from a user and then validates that input prior to committing the data to persistent storage such as a database.

Many computer systems implement data entry forms, but data collection systems tend to be more complex, with possibly many related forms containing detailed user input fields, data validations, and navigation links among the forms.

DCSs can be considered a specialized form of content management system (CMS), particularly when they allow the information being gathered to be published, edited, modified, deleted, and maintained. Some general-purpose CMSs include features of DCSs.

== Importance ==
Accurate data collection is essential to many business processes, to the enforcement of many government regulations, and to maintaining the integrity of scientific research.

Data collection systems are an end-product of software development. Identifying and categorizing software or a software sub-system as having aspects of, or as actually being a "Data collection system" is very important. This categorization allows encyclopedic knowledge to be gathered and applied in the design and implementation of future systems. In software design, it is very important to identify generalizations and patterns and to re-use existing knowledge whenever possible.

== Types ==
Generally the computer software used for data collection falls into one of the following categories of practical application.

- Surveys or questionnaires
- Data registries
- Case management systems
- Performance measurement systems
- Exams and quizzes
- Online forms and form filing and reporting systems

== Vocabulary ==
There is a taxonomic scheme associated with data collection systems, with readily-identifiable synonyms used by different industries and organizations. Cataloging the most commonly used and widely accepted vocabulary improves efficiencies, helps reduce variations, and improves data quality.

The vocabulary of data collection systems stems from the fact that these systems are often a software representation of what would otherwise be a paper data collection form with a complex internal structure of sections and sub-sections. Modeling these structures and relationships in software yields technical terms describing the hierarchy of data containers, along with a set of industry-specific synonyms.

=== Collection synonyms ===
A collection (used as a noun) is the topmost container for grouping related documents, data models, and datasets. Typical vocabulary at this level includes the terms:

- Project
- Registry
- Repository
- System
- Top-level Container
- Library
- Study
- Organization
- Party
- Site

=== Data model synonyms ===
Each document or dataset within a collection is modeled in software. Constructing these models is part of designing or "authoring" the expected data to be collected. The terminology for these data models includes:

- Data model
- Data dictionary
- Schema
- Form
- Document
- Survey
- Instrument
- Questionnaire
- Data Sheet
- Expected Measurements
- Expected Observations
- Encounter Form
- Study Visit Form

=== Sub-collection or master-detail synonyms ===
Data models are often hierarchical, containing sub-collections or master–detail structures described with terms such as:

- Section, Sub-section
- Block
- Module
- Sub-document
- Roster
- Parent-Child
- Dynamic List

=== Data element synonyms ===
At the lowest level of the data model are the data elements that describe individual pieces of data. Synonyms include:

- (Data) Field
- Attribute
- Column (Definition)
- Parameter
- Item
- Variable
- Question

=== Data point synonyms ===
Moving from the abstract, domain modelling facet to that of the concrete, actual data: the lowest level here is the data point within a dataset. Synonyms for data point include:

- Value
- Input
- Answer
- Response
- Observation
- Measurement
- Parameter Value
- Column Value

=== Dataset synonyms ===
Finally, the synonyms for dataset include:

- Row
- Record
- Occurrence
- Instance
- (Document) Filing
- Episode
- Submission
- Observation Point
- Case
- Test
- (Individual) Sample

== See also ==
- Data management
- Survey data collection
- Case report form
- Safety data sheet
- Data mining
- Web mining
- Crowdsourcing
- Collaborative software
