= Noise-equivalent temperature =

Noise-equivalent temperature (NET) is a measure of the sensitivity of a detector of thermal radiation in the infrared, terahertz or microwave portions of the electromagnetic spectrum. It is the amount of incident signal temperature that would be needed to match the internal noise of the detector such that the signal-to-noise ratio is equal to one. Often the spectrum of the NET is reported as a temperature per root bandwidth. A detector that measures power is often interested in the analogous noise-equivalent power (NEP). If a relation between intensity and temperature is well defined over the passband, as in the case of a blackbody, then the NET simply scales with the NEP.

If a detector is limited by either shot noise or Johnson noise then the NET can be decreased by using an increased integration time. The NET of flicker noise limited detectors can not be reduced by increased integration time.

Typically uncooled bolometric detectors have NET figures of 30-200 mK. Cooled photon detecting infrared detectors using materials such as HgCdTe (LWIR or MWIR) or InSb (MWIR) can approach a NET figure of 10 mK. In the microwave radiation region NET values are typically several hundred millikelvins to several kelvins.

For a particular mean signal temperature there is a fundamental limit to NET given by the natural thermodynamic fluctuations of the photon flux from the source under investigation.

== See also ==
- Noise-equivalent power
- Specific detectivity
- Minimum resolvable temperature difference
