= Nadir =

Direction pointing directly below a particular location

Diagram showing the relationship between the zenith, the nadir, and different types of horizon. Note that the zenith is opposite the nadir.

The nadir (Note: /ˈneɪdɪər, -dər/, also UK: /ˈnædɪər/; from Arabic: نظير [naðˤiːr],, ALA-LC: naẓīr, meaning "counterpart") (Note: Although the English word Nadir comes from the Arabic naẓīr, the word "Nadir" in Arabic: (نادر) has a different meaning, which translates as 'rare' in English.) is the direction pointing directly below a particular location; that is, it is one of two vertical directions at a specified location, orthogonal to a horizontal flat surface.

The direction opposite of the nadir is the zenith.

== Etymology ==
Although it entered English via other European languages, the word "nadir" is ultimately an Arabic loanword. It comes from the Arabic word "نظير nazir", meaning "opposite to". More specifically, it originated from the Arabic phrase "نظير السمت nazir as-samt", meaning "[the] opposite direction [to the zenith point]" .

== Definitions ==
This diagram depicts a satellite observing backscattered sunlight in the nadir viewing geometry.

=== Space science ===
Since the concept of being below is itself somewhat vague, scientists define the nadir in more rigorous terms. Specifically, in astronomy, geophysics and related sciences (such as meteorology), the nadir at a given point is the local vertical direction pointing in the direction of the force of gravity at that location.

The term can also be used to represent the lowest point that a celestial object reaches along its apparent daily path around a given point of observation (in other words, the object's lower culmination). This can be used to describe the position of the Sun, but it is only technically accurate for one latitude at a time and only possible at the low latitudes. The Sun is said to be at the nadir at a location when it is at the zenith at the location's antipode and is 90° below the horizon.

Nadir also refers to the downward-facing viewing geometry of an orbiting satellite, such as is employed during remote sensing of the atmosphere, as well as when an astronaut faces the Earth while performing a spacewalk. A nadir image is a satellite image or aerial photo of the Earth taken vertically. A satellite ground track represents its orbit projected to nadir on to Earth's surface.

=== Medicine ===
Generally in medicine, nadir is used to indicate the progression to the lowest point of a clinical symptom (e.g. fever patterns) or a laboratory count. In oncology, the term nadir is used to represent the lowest level of a blood cell count while a patient is undergoing chemotherapy. A diagnosis of neutropenic nadir after chemotherapy typically lasts 7–10 days.

=== Figurative usage ===
The word is also used figuratively to mean a low point, such as with a person's spirits, the quality of an activity or profession, or the nadir of American race relations.
