= Suomi NPP =

American Earth weather satellite (2011–2026)

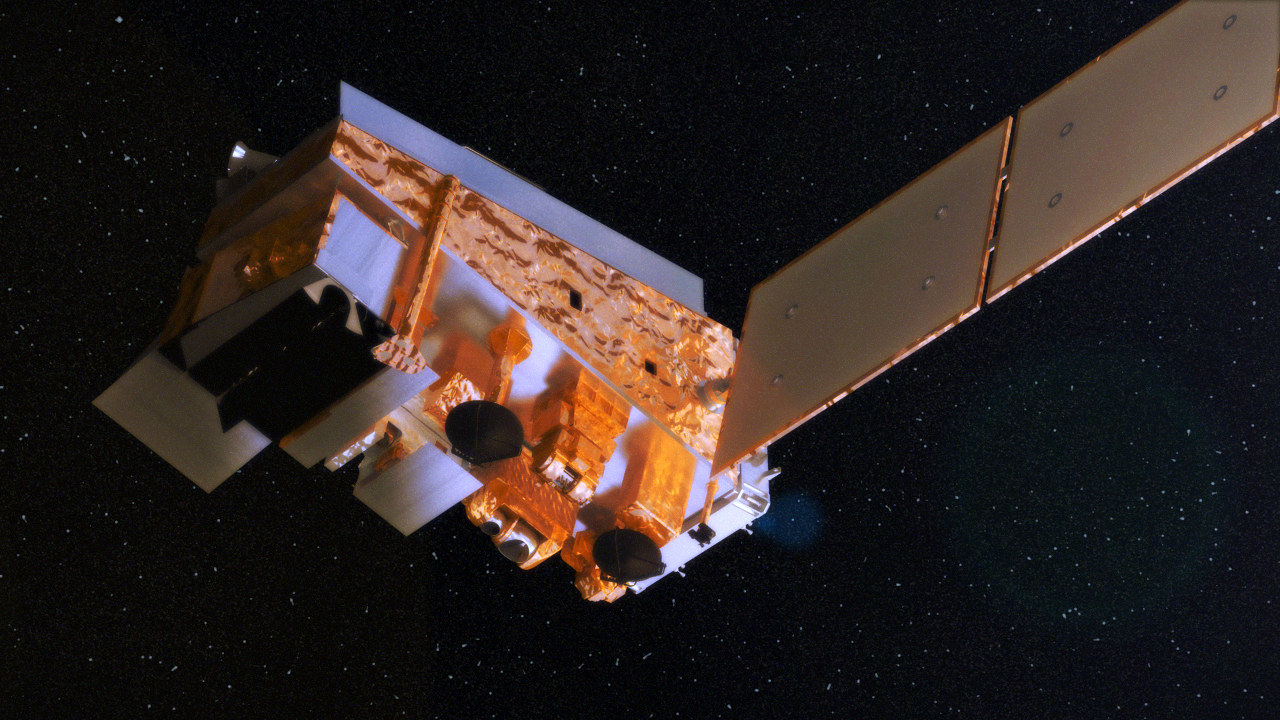
- Artist's rendering of the Suomi NPP satellite
- Names: Suomi National Polar-orbiting Partnership; NPOESS Preparatory Project (NPP)
- Mission type: Weather
- Operator: NASA / NOAA / DoD
- COSPAR ID: 2011-061A
- SATCAT no.: 37849
- Mission duration: 5 years (planned); 15 years, 5 days (total)

Spacecraft properties
- Bus: BCP-2000
- Manufacturer: Ball Aerospace & Technologies
- Launch mass: 2,128 kg (4,691 lb)
- Dry mass: 1,400 kg (3,100 lb)
- Payload mass: 464 kg (1,023 lb)
- Dimensions: 1.3 m x 1.3 m x 4.2 m
- Power: 2000 watts

Start of mission
- Launch date: 28 October 2011, 09:48:01.828 UTC
- Rocket: Delta II 7920-10C; D-357
- Launch site: Vandenberg, SLC-2W
- Contractor: United Launch Alliance

End of mission
- Disposal: Decommissioned
- Deactivated: 2 November 2026
- Decay date: December 2026 (planned)

Orbital parameters
- Reference system: Geocentric orbit
- Regime: Sun-synchronous orbit
- Perigee altitude: 833.7 km (518.0 mi)
- Apogee altitude: 834.3 km (518.4 mi)
- Inclination: 98.79°
- Period: 101.44 minutes
Instruments
- CERES: Clouds and the Earth's Radiant Energy System
- CrIS: Cross-track Infrared Sounder
- OMPS: Ozone Mapping and Profiler Suite
- ATMS: Advanced Technology Microwave Sounder
- VIIRS: Visible Infrared Imaging Radiometer Suite
- Insignia for the NPOESS Preparatory Project Large Strategic Science Missions; Earth Science Division Joint Polar Satellite System; NPOESS Preparatory Project

The Suomi National Polar-orbiting Partnership (Suomi NPP), previously known as the National Polar-orbiting Operational Environmental Satellite System Preparatory Project (NPP) and NPP-Bridge, is a weather satellite operated by the United States National Oceanic and Atmospheric Administration (NOAA). It operated from 28 October 2011 to its decommissioning on 2 November 2026, and is expected to be deorbited by December 2026.

Suomi NPP was originally intended as a pathfinder for the National Polar-orbiting Operational Environmental Satellite System (NPOESS) program, which was to have replaced NOAA's Polar Operational Environmental Satellites (POES) and the U.S. Air Force's Defense Meteorological Satellite Program (DMSP). Suomi NPP was launched in 2011 after the cancellation of NPOESS to serve as a stop-gap between the POES satellites and the Joint Polar Satellite System (JPSS) which will replace them. Its instruments provide climate measurements that continue prior observations by NASA's Earth Observing System (EOS).

== Name ==
The satellite is named after Verner E. Suomi, a Finnish-American meteorologist at the University of Wisconsin–Madison. The name was announced on 24 January 2012, three months after the satellite's launch.

== History ==
Suomi NPP was intended to bridge the gap between the old Earth Observing System (EOS) and the new JPSS system by flying new instruments, on a new satellite bus, using a new ground data network. Originally planned for launch five years earlier as a joint NASA/NOAA/DoD project, NPP was to be a pathfinder mission for the larger National Polar-orbiting Operational Environmental Satellite System (NPOESS) until DoD participation in the larger project was dissolved. The project continued as a civilian weather forecasting replacement for the NOAA Polar Operational Environmental Satellites (POES) series, and ensured continuity of climate measurements begun by the Earth Observing System (EOS) of NASA.

== Launch ==
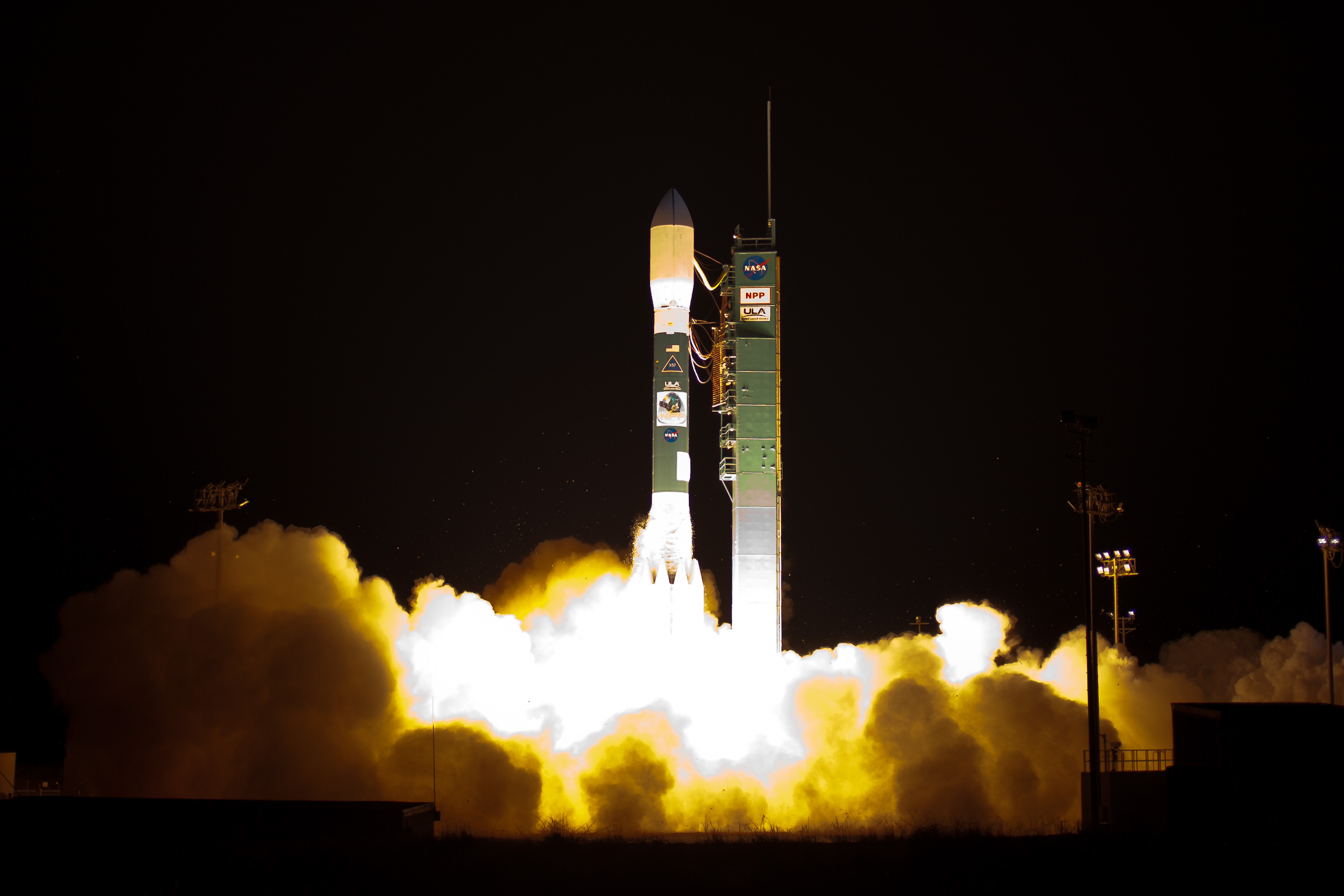
Launch of Suomi-NPP

The spacecraft was launched on 28 October 2011 from Space Launch Complex-2W (SLC-2W) at Vandenberg Space Force Base in California by a United Launch Alliance Delta II in the 7920-10 configuration (Extra Extended Long Tank with RS-27A engine first stage, 9 GEM-40 solid rocket motors, type 2 second stage with Aerojet AJ10-118K engine, no third stage and a 10-foot fairing). Additionally, the rocket deployed five CubeSats as a part of NASA ELaNa III manifest.

The satellite was placed into a Sun-synchronous orbit (SSO) 833 km (518 mi) above the Earth.

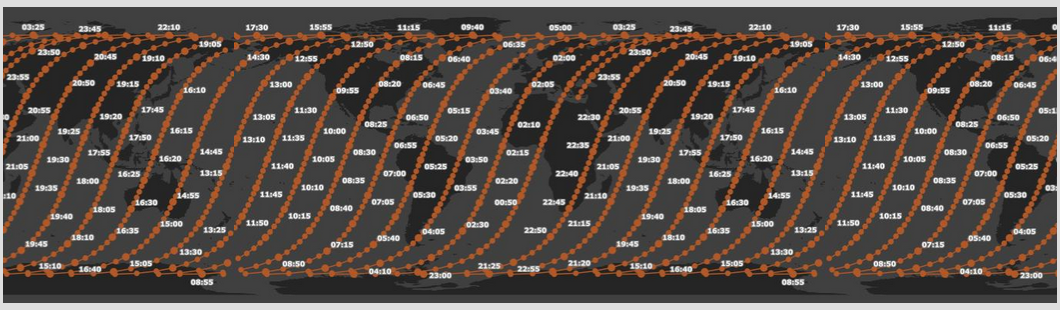
Suomi NPP's descending orbital path

== Spacecraft ==
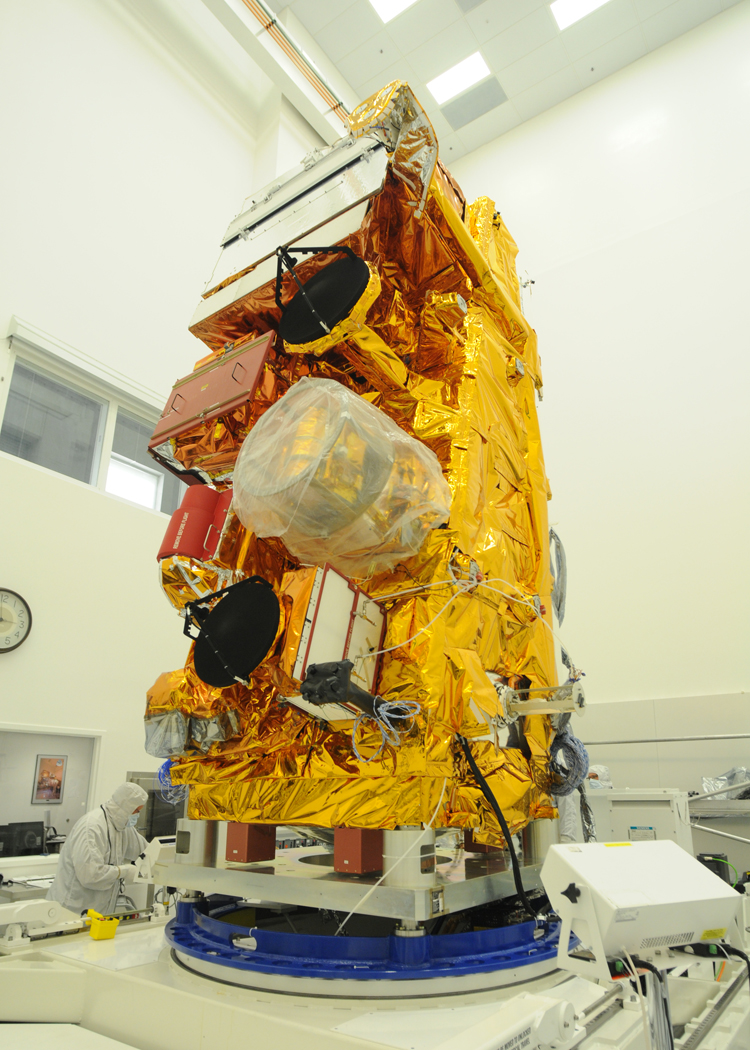
Suomi NPP in the cleanroom before launch

The Suomi NPP spacecraft was built and integrated by BATC (Ball Aerospace and Technologies Corporation) of Boulder, Colorado (NASA/GSFC contract award in May 2002). The platform design is a variation of BCP 2000 (Ball Commercial Platform) bus of BATC of ICESat and CloudSat heritage. The spacecraft consists of an aluminum honeycomb structure.

The ADCS (Attitude Determination and Control Subsystem) provides three-axis stabilization using four reaction wheels for fine attitude control, three torquer bars for momentum unloading, thrusters for coarse attitude control (such as during large-angle slews for orbital maintenance), two star trackers for fine attitude determination, three gyroscopes for attitude and attitude rate determination between star tracker updates, two Earth sensors for safe-mode attitude control, and coarse Sun sensors for initial attitude acquisition, all monitored and controlled by the spacecraft controls a computer. ADCS provides real-time attitude knowledge of 10 arcsec (1 sigma) at the spacecraft navigation reference base, real-time spacecraft position knowledge of 25 m (1 sigma), and attitude control of 36 arcsec (1 sigma).

The EPS (Electrical Power Subsystem) uses gallium arsenide (GaAs) solar cells to generate an average power of about 2 kW (EOL). The solar array rotates once per orbit to maintain a nominally normal orientation to the Sun. In addition, a single-wing solar array is mounted on the anti-solar side of the spacecraft; its function is to preclude thermal input into the sensitive cryo radiators of the Visible Infrared Imaging Radiometer Suite (VIIRS) and Cross-track Infrared Sounder (CrIS) instruments. A regulated 28 ±6 VDC power bus distributes energy to all spacecraft subsystems and instruments. A nickel–hydrogen battery (NiH) system provides power for eclipse phase operations.

The spacecraft has an on-orbit design lifetime of five years (available consumables for seven years). The spacecraft dry mass is about 1400 kg. NPP is designed to support controlled reentry at the end of its mission life (via propulsive maneuvers to lower the orbit perigee to approximately 50 km and target any surviving debris for open ocean entry). NPP is expected to have sufficient debris that survives reentry so as to require controlled reentry to place the debris in a pre-determined location in the ocean.

== Instruments ==
The Suomi NPP is the first in a new generation of satellites intended to replace the Earth Observing System (EOS) satellites, which were launched from 1997 to 2009. The satellite orbits the Earth about 14 times each day. Its five imaging systems include:

=== Visible Infrared Imaging Radiometer Suite (VIIRS) ===
The Visible Infrared Imaging Radiometer Suite (VIIRS) is the largest instrument aboard of Suomi-NPP (National Polar-Orbiting Operational Environmental Satellite System (NPOESS) Preparatory Project). It collects radiometric imagery in visible and infrared wavelengths of the land, atmosphere, ice, and ocean. It will survey broad swaths of the land, oceans, and air, enabling scientists to monitor everything from phytoplankton and other organisms in the sea, vegetation and forest cover, and the amount of sea ice at the poles. Data from VIIRS, collected from 22 channels across the electromagnetic spectrum, will also be used to observe active fires, ocean color, sea surface temperature, and other surface features.

=== Ozone Mapping and Profiler Suite (OMPS) ===
The Ozone Mapping and Profiler Suite (OMPS) measures the ozone layer in our upper atmosphere tracking the status of global ozone distributions, including the ozone hole. It also monitors ozone levels in the troposphere. OMPS extends out 40-year long record ozone layer measurements while also providing improved vertical resolution compared to previous operational instruments. Closer to the ground, OMPS's measurements of harmful ozone improve air quality monitoring and when combined with cloud predictions; help to create the Ultraviolet index. OMPS has two sensors, both new designs, composed of three advanced hyperspectral-imaging spectrometers.

=== Clouds and the Earth's Radiant Energy System (CERES) ===
The Clouds and the Earth's Radiant Energy System (CERES) is used to study the Earth's radiation budget. Monitoring the amount of energy emitted and reflected by the planet, it measures both solar energy reflected by the Earth and heat emitted by our planet. This solar and thermal energy are key parts of the Earth's radiation budget. CERES instrument continues a multi-year record of the amount of energy entering and exiting from the top of the atmosphere of Earth. It will provide scientists with needed long-term, stable data sets to make accurate projections of global climate change.

=== Cross-track Infrared Sounder (CrIS) ===
The Cross-track Infrared Sounder (CrIS) has 1305 spectral channels and will produce high-resolution, three-dimensional temperature, pressure, and moisture profiles. It measures continuous channels in the infrared region and has the ability to measure temperature profiles with improved accuracy over its predecessors. These profiles will be used to enhance weather forecasting models and will facilitate both short- and long-term weather forecasting. Over longer timescales, they will help improve understanding of climate phenomena.

=== Advanced Technology Microwave Sounder (ATMS) ===
The Advanced Technology Microwave Sounder (ATMS), works in conjunction with the Cross-track Infrared Sounder (CrIS) to make detailed vertical profiles of atmospheric pressure, heat, and moisture. ATMS, a cross-track scanner with 22 channels, provides sounding observations needed to retrieve profiles of atmospheric temperature and moisture for civilian operational weather forecasting as well as continuity of these measurements for climate monitoring purposes. CrIS will operate at infrared wavelengths, while ATMS will operate at much longer, microwave, wavelengths.

== Mission ==
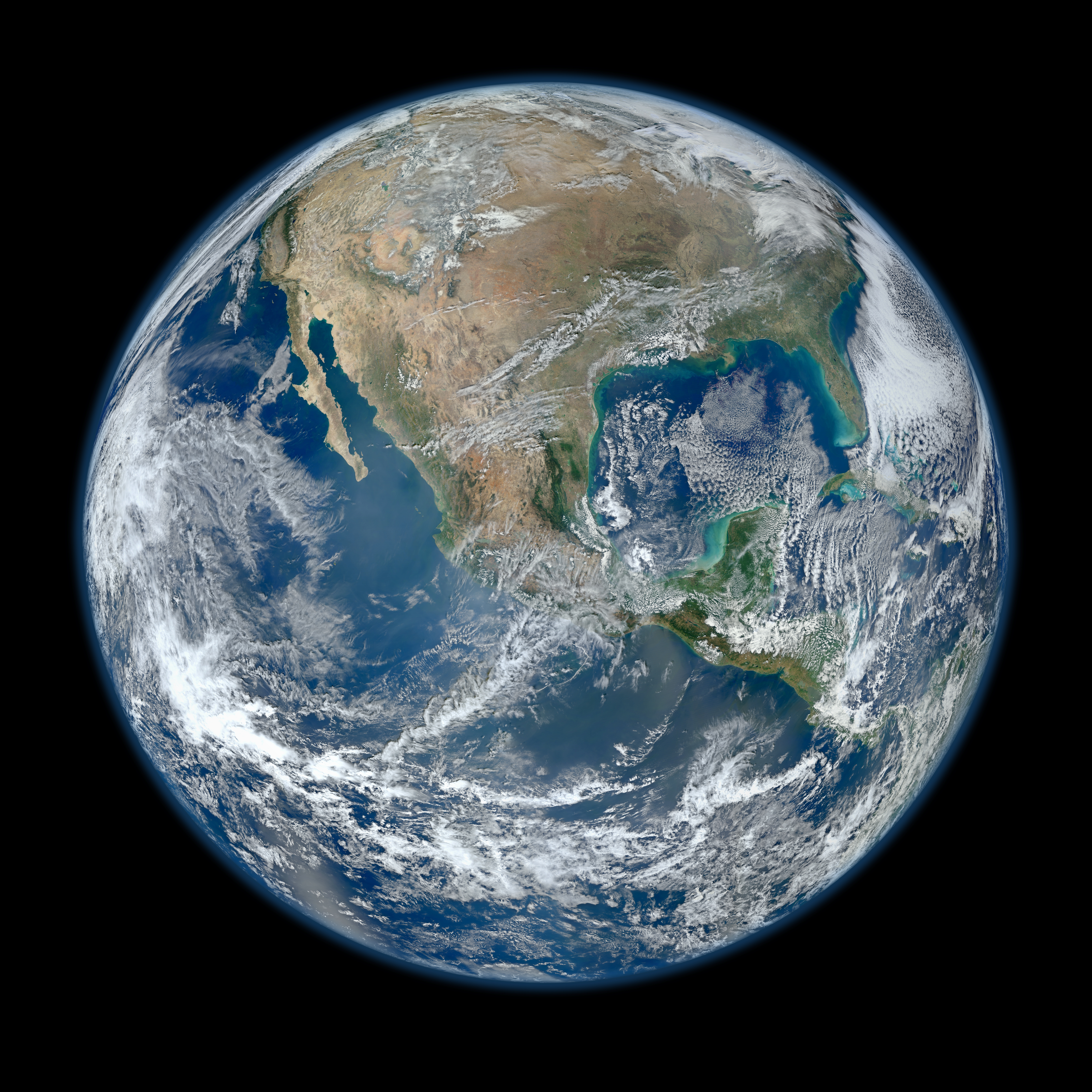
Blue Marble 2012, created from Suomi NPP composite imagery

The VIIRS sensor on board the spacecraft acquired its first measurements of Earth on 21 November 2011. A few weeks later, the science team detected a gradual, but persistent, decrease in the optical throughput for the Near Infrared (NIR) bands. An investigation found that degradation was caused by tungsten oxide on the SNPP VIIRS RTA mirror surfaces. After looking at the build records, they found the problem came from a one-time change made during the mirror coating process to try to make the surface reflect better.

NASA also released a high resolution blue marble image of the Earth showing most of North America, which was created by NASA oceanographer Norman Kuring using data obtained on 4 January 2012 by the Visible Infrared Imager Radiometer Suite (VIIRS), one of five imaging systems aboard the satellite. That date was chosen because it was a fairly sunny day in most of North America.

The CrIS Medium Wave Infrared bands went non-operational effective 12 July 2021.

On 25 May 2024, an anomaly with NPP's Global Positioning System (GPS) caused significant degradation in geolocation performance for the VIIRS data. The anomaly was corrected 11 days later. Similar anomalies occurred in September and November of the same year.

On 23 December 2025, the SSM on CrIS failed due to a space radiation error. Engineers tried repeatedly to fix the part, but were unsuccessful. On February 11, 2026, NOAA decided to suspend recovery operations, ending the operational use of the instrument.

On 3 August 2026, NOAA announced that it would cease delivering Suomi NPP data to users on 1 November 2026.

== Gallery ==
Earth, created from Suomi NPP composite imagery.

Earth at night, created from Suomi NPP composite imagery.

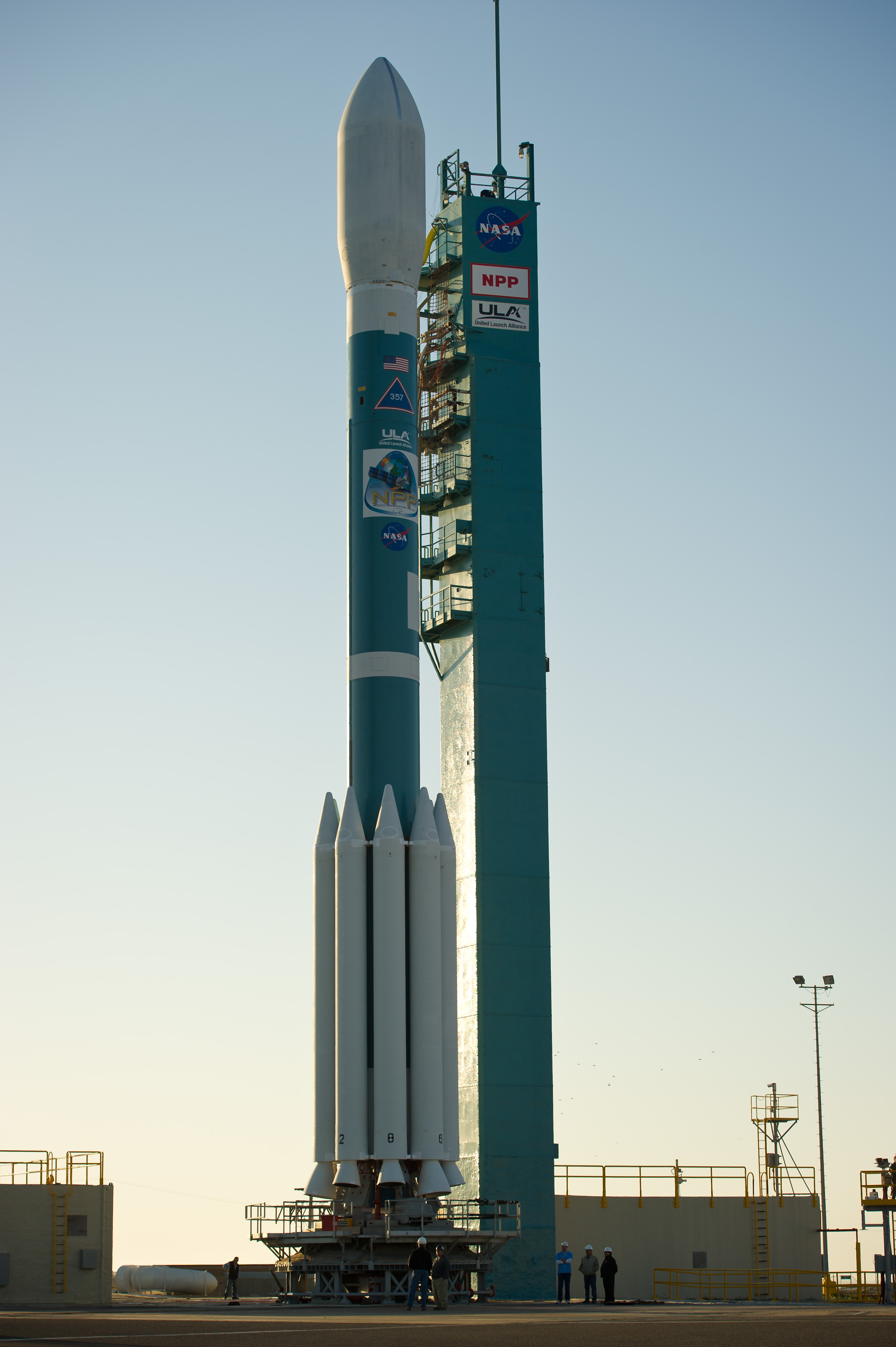
Delta II rocket carrying NPP.

NPP launch video

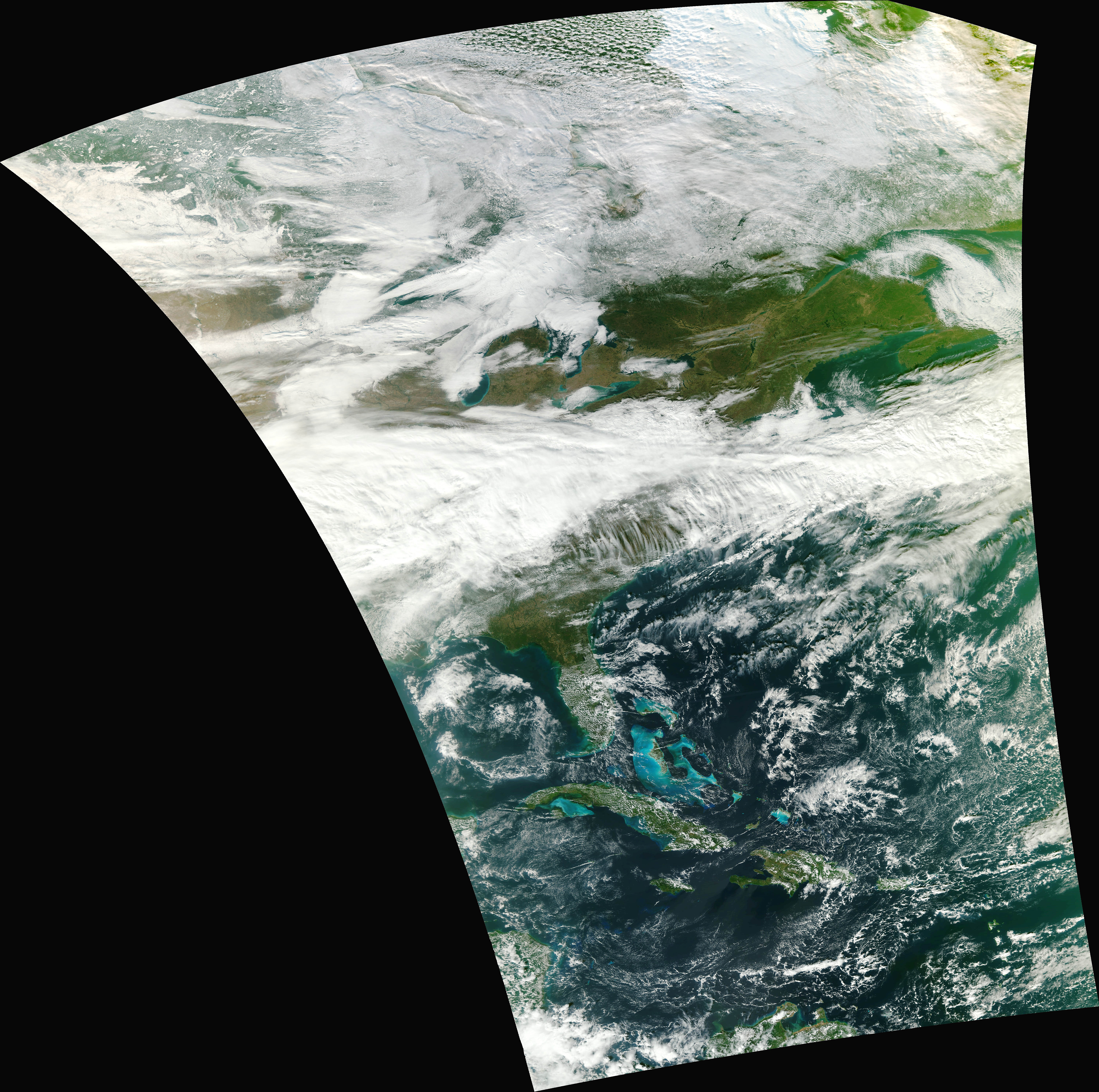
First image acquired by the VIIRS sensor.

This composite image of southern Africa and the surrounding oceans was captured by six orbits of the satellite.

Iowa power outage

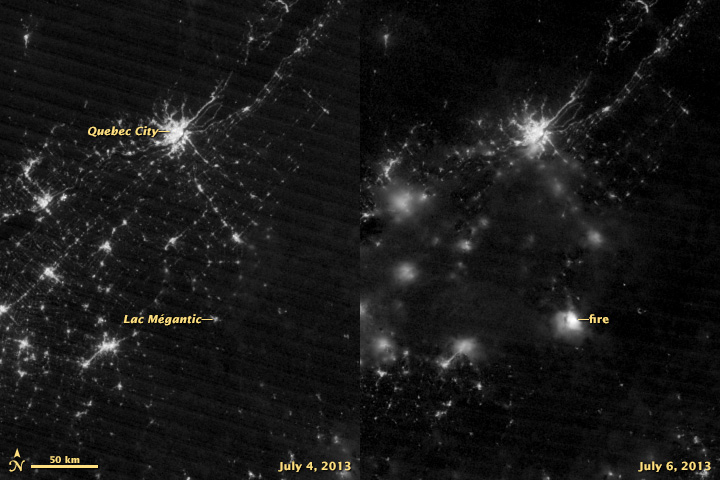
Lac-Megantic derailment
