= Weather System Follow-on Microwave Program =

American meteorology satellite

Weather System Follow-on Microwave
- Names: WSF-M
- Mission type: Space weather
- Operator: USSF
- COSPAR ID: 2024-070A
- SATCAT no.: 59481

Spacecraft properties
- Manufacturer: Ball Aerospace & Technologies

Start of mission
- Launch date: 11 April 2024, 14:25 UTC (WSF-M1); 2027 (WSF-M2)
- Rocket: Falcon 9 Block 5
- Launch site: Vandenberg, SLC-4E
- Contractor: SpaceX

Orbital parameters
- Reference system: Geocentric orbit
- Regime: Sun-synchronous orbit

Instruments
- Microwave imaging radiometer

The Weather System Follow-on Microwave (WSF-M) satellite is the United States Department of Defense's next-generation operational environmental satellite system. WSF-M will be a Sun-synchronous low Earth orbit (LEO) satellite with a passive microwave imaging radiometer instrument and hosted furnished Energetic Charged Particle (ECP) sensor. Space Operations Command intends to include ECP sensors on all future satellites for space weather monitoring, starting from the early 2020s.

== History ==
WSF-M is the first satellite in the Weather System Follow-on (WSF) program. Following the cancellation of the National Polar-orbiting Operational Environmental Satellite System (NPOESS), the Air Force continued the development of a weather satellite under the Defense Weather Satellite System (DWSS) program based on NPOESS. However, when that system faced delays and funding issues, the White House cancelled it and instituted the WSF program.

WSF-M is designed to mitigate three high priority U.S. DoD Space-Based Environmental Monitoring (SBEM) gaps: ocean surface vector winds, tropical cyclone intensity and LEO energetic charged particles.

== WSF-M1 ==
Weather System Follow-on Microwave-1
- Names: WSF-M1
- Mission type: Space weather
- Operator: USSF
- COSPAR ID: 2024-070A
- SATCAT no.: 59481

Spacecraft properties
- Manufacturer: Ball Aerospace & Technologies

Start of mission
- Launch date: 11 April 2024, 14:25 UTC
- Rocket: Falcon 9 Block 5 Cargo
- Launch site: Vandenberg
- Contractor: SpaceX

Orbital parameters
- Reference system: Geocentric orbit
- Regime: Sun-synchronous orbit

Instruments
- Microwave imaging radiometer

WSF-M1 was launched in April 2024 on a Falcon 9 Block 5 rocket from Vandenberg Space Force Base.

== WSF-M2 ==
Weather System Follow-on Microwave-2
- Names: WSF-M2
- Mission type: Space weather
- Operator: USSF
- COSPAR ID: 2024-070A
- SATCAT no.: 59481

Spacecraft properties
- Manufacturer: Ball Aerospace & Technologies

Start of mission
- Launch date: 2027
- Rocket: Falcon 9 Block 5
- Launch site: Vandenberg
- Contractor: SpaceX

Orbital parameters
- Reference system: Geocentric orbit
- Regime: Sun-synchronous orbit

Instruments
- Microwave imaging radiometer

== See also ==
- Defense Meteorological Satellite Program
- NPOESS
- Joint Polar Satellite System
- Defense Weather Satellite System
