= Titan 23G =

American expendable launch vehicle

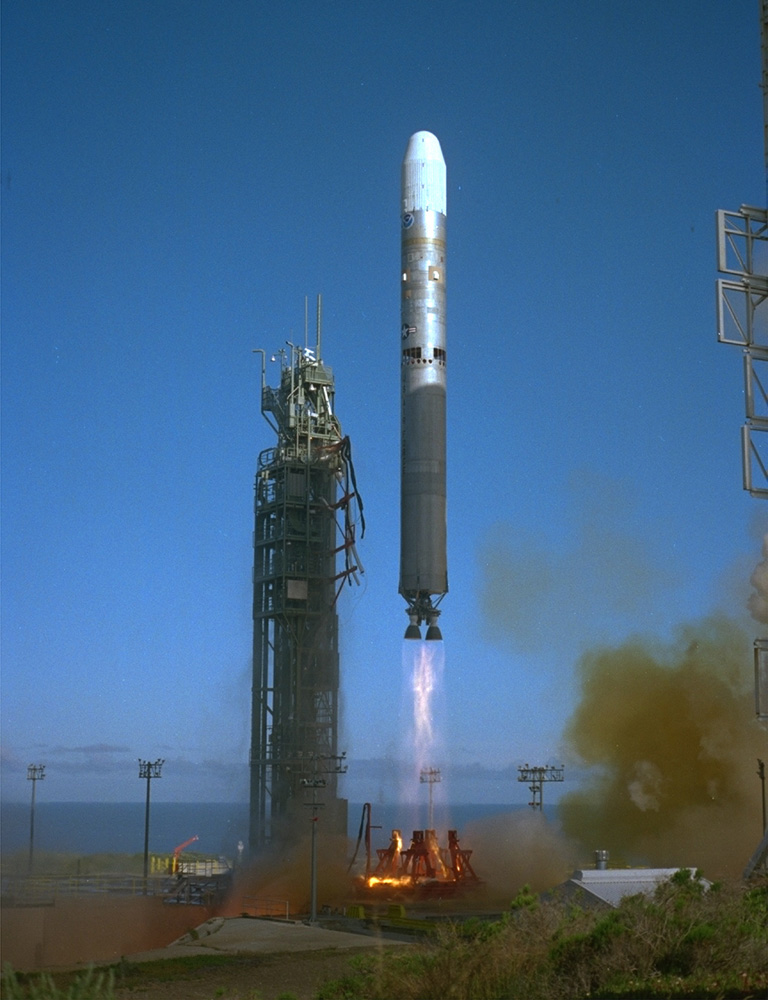
- Titan 23G launches NOAA-15, 13 May 1998
- Function: Medium-lift launch vehicle
- Manufacturer: Martin Marietta / Lockheed Martin
- Country of origin: United States

Size
- Height: 31.4 m (103 ft)
- Diameter: 3.05 m (10.0 ft)
- Mass: 117,020 kg (257,980 lb)
- Stages: 2 or 3

Capacity

Payload to LEO
- Mass: 3,600 kg (7,900 lb)

Payload to Polar LEO
- Mass: 2,177 kg (4,799 lb)

Payload to HCO
- Mass: 227 kg (500 lb)

Associated rockets
- Family: Titan

Launch history
- Status: Retired
- Launch sites: Vandenberg, SLC-4W
- Total launches: 13
- Success(es): 12
- Failure: 1
- First flight: 5 September 1988
- Last flight: 18 October 2003
- Carries passengers or cargo: Clementine; QuickSCAT

First stage
- Powered by: LR-87 (one engine with two combustion chambers)
- Maximum thrust: 1,900 kN (430,000 lb_{f})
- Specific impulse: 258 s (2.53 km/s)
- Burn time: 156 seconds
- Propellant: N_{2}O_{4} / Aerozine 50

Second stage
- Powered by: 1 LR-91
- Maximum thrust: 445 kN (100,000 lb_{f})
- Specific impulse: 316 s (3.10 km/s)
- Burn time: 180 seconds
- Propellant: N_{2}O_{4} / Aerozine 50

Third stage (Optional) – Star-37XFP-ISS
- Empty mass: 71.7 kg (158 lb)
- Gross mass: 955.3 kg (2,106 lb)
- Propellant mass: 883.6 kg (1,948 lb)
- Maximum thrust: 38.03 kN (8,550 lb_{f})
- Specific impulse: 290 s (2.8 km/s)
- Burn time: 67 seconds
- Propellant: HTPB

Third stage (Optional) – Star-37S
- Empty mass: 53.4 kg (118 lb)
- Gross mass: 711.4 kg (1,568 lb)
- Propellant mass: 658 kg (1,451 lb)
- Specific impulse: 287 s (2.81 km/s)

The Titan 23G, Titan II(23)G, Titan 2(23)G or Titan II SLV was an American medium-lift launch vehicle derived from the LGM-25C Titan II intercontinental ballistic missile. Retired Titan II missiles were converted by Martin Marietta, into which the Glenn L. Martin Company, which built the original Titan II, had merged. It was used to carry payloads for the United States Air Force (USAF), NASA and National Oceanic and Atmospheric Administration (NOAA). Thirteen were launched from Space Launch Complex 4W (SLC-4W) at the Vandenberg Air Force Base between 1988 and 2003.

== Configuration ==
Titan 23G rockets consisted of two stages burning liquid propellant. The first stage was powered by one Aerojet LR87 engine with two combustion chambers and nozzles, and the second stage was propelled by an LR91. On some flights, the spacecraft included a kick motor, usually the Star-37XFP-ISS; however, the Star-37S was also used.

A contract to refurbish fourteen Titan II missiles to the Titan 23G configuration was awarded to Martin Marietta in January 1986. The first launch occurred on 5 September 1988, carrying a classified payload for the U.S. National Reconnaissance Office. Thirteen were launched, with the fourteenth going to the Evergreen Aviation Museum. The final flight occurred on 17 October 2003, carrying a Defense Meteorological Satellite Program (DMSP) satellite.

During refurbishment, the forward structure of the second stage was modified with the addition of a payload attachment fitting to attach the payload to the rocket, and installing a payload fairing to protect it during launch. The engines were refurbished, and the rockets' guidance and control systems were upgraded by Delco Electronics.

The former Titan IIIB pad at Vandenberg, SLC-4W, was modified to accommodate the Titan 23G, and was used for all thirteen launches.

== Launch history ==
All launches of Titan II(23)G rockets took place from Space Launch Complex 4W (SLC-4W) at Vandenberg Air Force Base.

Date/Time (UTC)	Serial number		Third Stage	Payload	Outcome	Remarks
Date/Time (UTC)	Rocket	Stages	Third Stage	Payload	Outcome	Remarks
5 September 1988; 09:25	G-1	B-98/56	None	USA-32 (Bernie) FARRAH III	Success	
6 September 1989; 01:48	G-2	B-75/99	None	USA-45 (Bernie) FARRAH IV	Success	Spacecraft failed immediately after launch
25 April 1992; 08:53	G-3	B-102	None	USA-81 (Bernie) FARRAH V	Success	
5 October 1993; 17:56	G-5	B-65	Star-37XFP-ISS	Landsat 6	Failure	Star-37 failure, spacecraft failed to achieve orbit
25 January 1994; 16:34	G-11	B-89/67	None	Clementine; DSPSE-ISA	Success	
4 April 1997; 16:47	G-6	B-106	Star-37S-ISS	USA-131 (DMSP-5D2 F-14)	Success	
13 May 1998; 15:52:04	G-12	B-84/80	Star-37XFP-ISS	NOAA-15 (NOAA-K)	Success	Included oxidizer (N_{2}O_{4}) tank from Titan II B-72
20 June 1999; 02:15:00	G-7	B-99/75	None	QuikSCAT	Success	
12 December 1999; 17:36:01	G-8	B-94/44	Star-37XFP-ISS	USA-147 (DMSP-5D3 F-15)	Success	
21 September 2000; 10:22	G-13	B-96/39	Star-37XFP-ISS	NOAA-16 (NOAA-L)	Success	
24 June 2002; 18:23:04	G-14	B-71/72	Star-37XFP-ISS	NOAA-17 (NOAA-M)	Success	Included oxidizer (N_{2}O_{4}) tank from Titan II B-92
6 January 2003; 14:19	G-4	B-105	None	Coriolis	Success	
18 October 2003; 16:17	G-9	B-107	Star-37XFP-ISS	USA-172 (DMSP-5D3 F-16)	Success	Final Titan II launch

== Remaining rockets ==
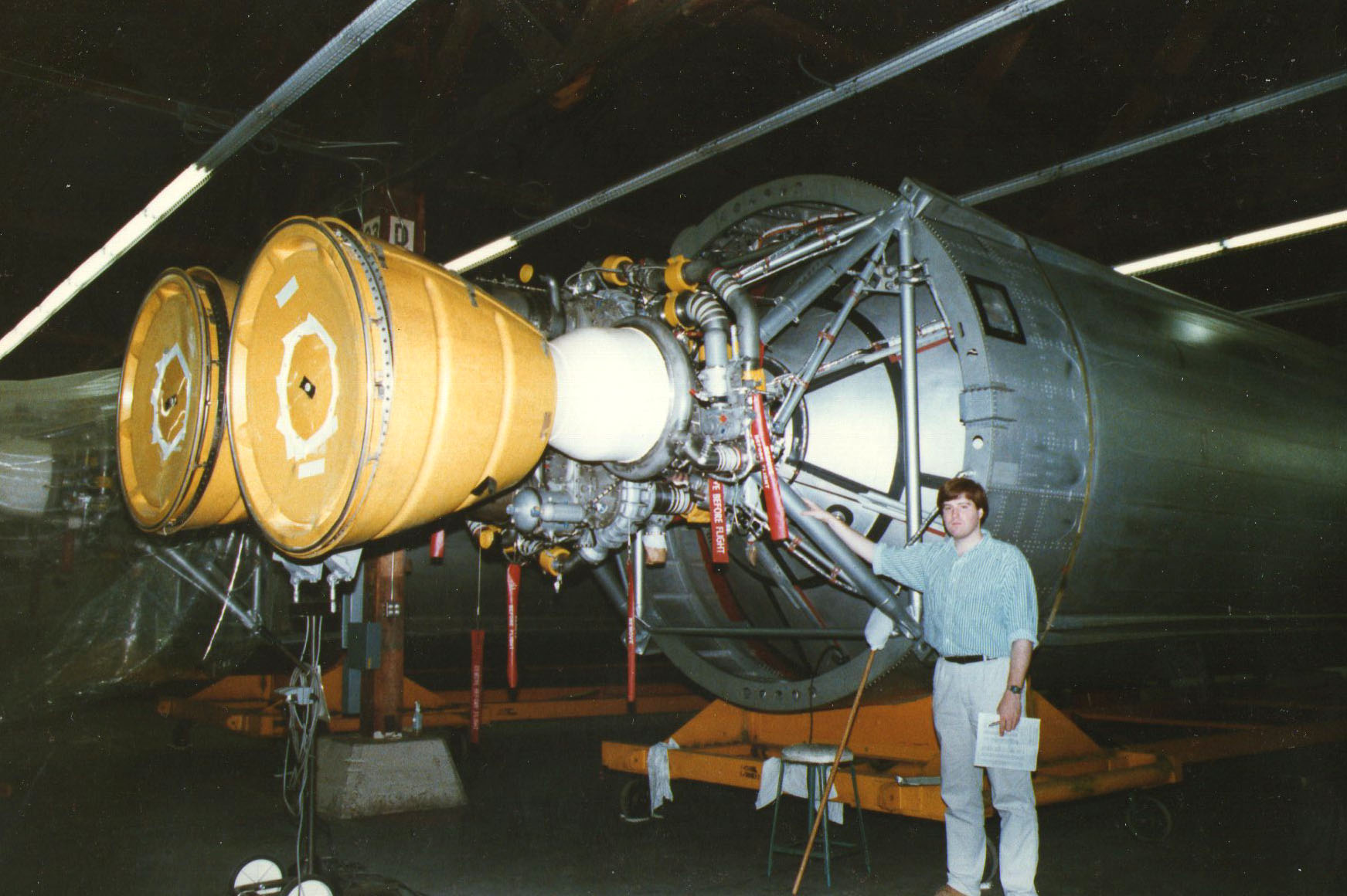
Titan-II B-108 in 1988 became Titan-23G10 program spare

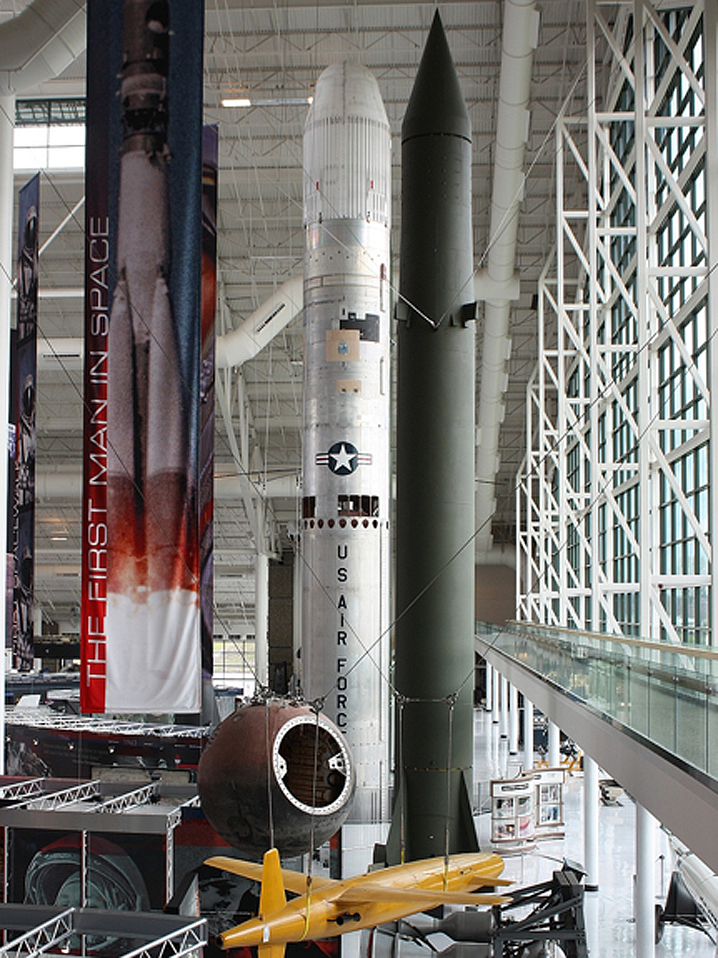
Titan-23G10 at the Evergreen Aviation & Space Museum

A fourteenth rocket, G-10, based on Titan II B-108, but incorporating an oxygen tank from B-80, was not launched and is preserved at the Evergreen Aviation & Space Museum in McMinnville, Oregon.

The remaining 42 Titan II missiles were stored at Davis-Monthan AFB with most being broken up for salvage. Four were transferred to museums.

== See also ==
- Atlas E/F
- Dnepr
- Minotaur I
- Minotaur IV
