= NOAA-16 =

American weather satellite (2000-2014)

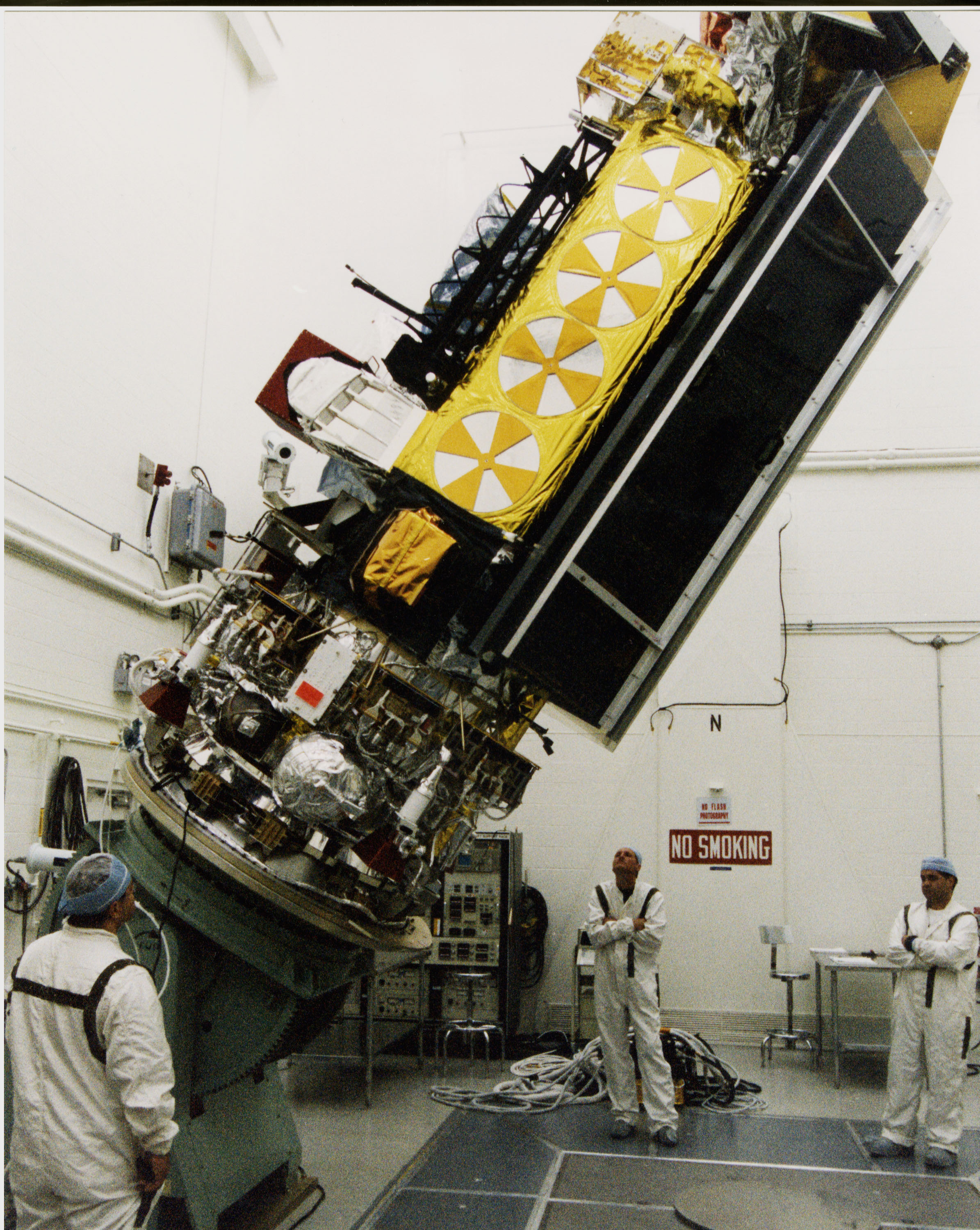
- NOAA-L before launch
- Names: NOAA-L
- Mission type: Weather
- Operator: NOAA
- COSPAR ID: 2000-055A
- SATCAT no.: 26536
- Mission duration: 2 years (planned); 13.75 years (achieved)

Spacecraft properties
- Spacecraft type: TIROS
- Bus: Advanced TIROS-N
- Manufacturer: Lockheed Martin
- Launch mass: 2,232 kg (4,921 lb)
- Dry mass: 1,479 kg (3,261 lb)
- Power: 833 watts

Start of mission
- Launch date: 21 September 2000, 10:22:00 UTC
- Rocket: Titan 23G Star-37XFP-ISS (Titan 23G S/N G-13)
- Launch site: Vandenberg, SLC-4W
- Contractor: Lockheed Martin

End of mission
- Disposal: Decommissioned
- Deactivated: 9 June 2014
- Destroyed: 25 November 2015
- Last contact: 6 June 2014

Orbital parameters
- Reference system: Geocentric orbit
- Regime: Sun-synchronous orbit
- Perigee altitude: 843 km (524 mi)
- Apogee altitude: 850 km (530 mi)
- Inclination: 98.80°
- Period: 102.10 minutes
Instruments
- AVHRR/3: Advanced Very High Resolution Radiometer
- HIRS/3: High Resolution Infrared Sounder
- SEM-2: Space Environment Monitor
- Argos DCS-2: Data Collection System
- SARSAT: Search and Rescue Satellite-Aided Tracking System
- SBUV/2: Solar Backscatter Ultraviolet Radiometer
- AMSU-A: Advanced Microwave Sounding Unit-A
- AMSU-B: Advanced Microwave Sounding Unit-B

NOAA-16, also known as NOAA-L before launch, was an operational, polar orbiting, weather satellite series (NOAA K-N) operated by the National Environmental Satellite Service (NESS) of the National Oceanic and Atmospheric Administration (NOAA). NOAA-16 continued the series of Advanced TIROS-N (ATN) spacecraft that began with the launch of NOAA-8 (NOAA-E) in 1983; but it had additional new and improved instrumentation over the NOAA A-K series and a new launch vehicle (Titan 23G). It was launched on 21 September 2000 and, following an unknown anomaly, it was decommissioned on 9 June 2014. In November 2015 it broke up in orbit, creating more than 200 pieces of debris.

== Launch ==
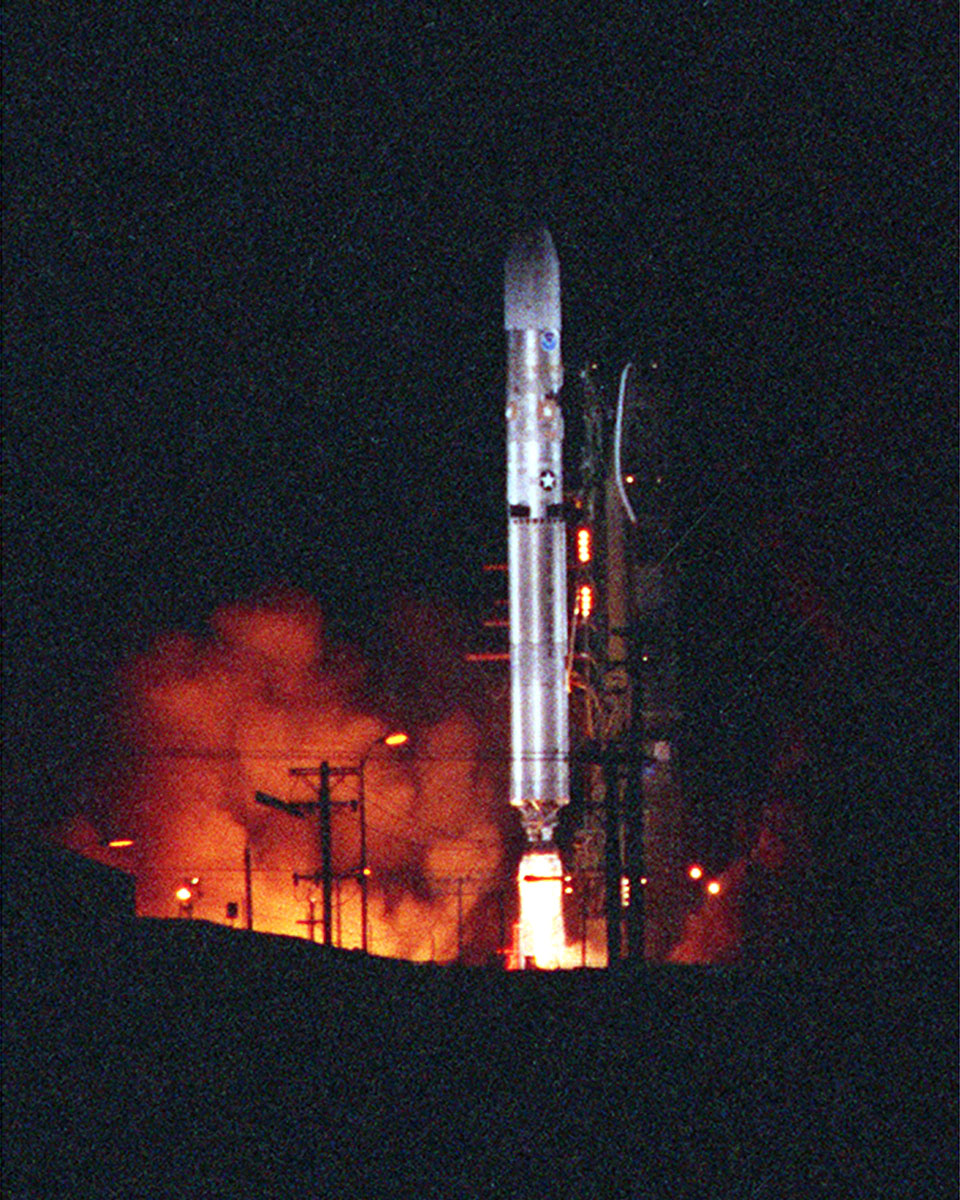
Launch of NOAA-16

NOAA-16 was launched by the Titan 23G launch vehicle on 21 September 2000 at 10:22 UTC from Vandenberg Air Force Base, at Vandenberg Space Launch Complex 4 (SLW-4W), in a Sun-synchronous orbit, at 843 km above the Earth, orbiting every 102.10 minutes. NOAA-16 was in a morning equator-crossing orbit and has replaced the NOAA-14 as the prime morning spacecraft.

== Spacecraft ==
The goal of the NOAA/NESS polar orbiting program is to provide output products used in meteorological prediction and warning, oceanographic and hydrologic services, and space environment monitoring. The polar orbiting system complements the NOAA/NESS geostationary meteorological satellite program (GOES). The NOAA-16 Advanced TIROS-N spacecraft was based on the Defense Meteorological Satellite Program (DMSP Block 5D) spacecraft and was a modified version of the ATN spacecraft (NOAA 6-11, 13-15) to accommodate the new instrumentation, supporting antennas and electrical subsystems. The spacecraft structure consisted of four components: 1° the Reaction System Support (RSS); 2° the Equipment Support Module (ESM); 3° the Instrument Mounting Platform (IMP); and 4° the Solar Array (SA).

== Instruments ==
All of the instruments were located on the ESM and the IMP. The spacecraft power was provided by a direct energy transfer system from the single solar array which consisted of eight panels of solar cells. The in-orbit Attitude Determination and Control Subsystem (ADACS) provided three-axis pointing control by controlling torque in three mutually orthogonal momentum wheels with input from the Earth Sensor Assembly (ESA) for pitch, roll, and yaw updates. The ADACS controlled the spacecraft attitude so that orientation of the three axes was maintained to within ± 0.2° and pitch, roll, and yaw to within 0.1°. The ADACS consisted of the Earth Sensor Assembly (ESA), the Sun Sensor Assembly (SSA), four Reaction Wheel Assemblies (RWA), two roll/yaw coils (RYC), two pitch torquing coils (PTC), four gyros, and computer software for data processing. The ATN data handling subsystem, consisted of the TIROS Information Processor (TIP) for low data rate instruments, the Manipulated Information Rate Processor (MIRP) for high data rate AVHRR, digital tape recorders (DTR), and a cross strap unit (XSU).

The NOAA-16 instrument complement consists of: 1° an improved six-channel Advanced Very High Resolution Radiometer/3 (AVHRR/3); 2° an improved High Resolution Infrared Radiation Sounder (HIRS/3); 3° the Search and Rescue Satellite Aided Tracking System (SARSAT), which consists of the Search and Rescue Repeater (SARR) and the Search and Rescue Processor (SARP-2); 4° the French/CNES-provided improved Argos Data Collection System (Argos DCS-2); 5° the Solar Backscatter Ultraviolet Spectral radiometer (SBUV/2); and 6° the Advanced Microwave Sounding Unit (AMSU), which consists of three separate modules, A1, A2, and B to replace the previous MSU and SSU instruments.

It hosts the Advanced Microwave Sounding Unit (AMSU), Advanced very-high-resolution radiometer (AVHRR) and High Resolution Infrared Radiation Sounder (HIRS) instruments' Automatic Picture Transmission (APT) transmitter. NOAA-16 has the same suite of instruments as carried by NOAA-15 plus an SBUV/2 instrument as well.

=== Advanced Very High Resolution Radiometer (AVHRR/3) ===
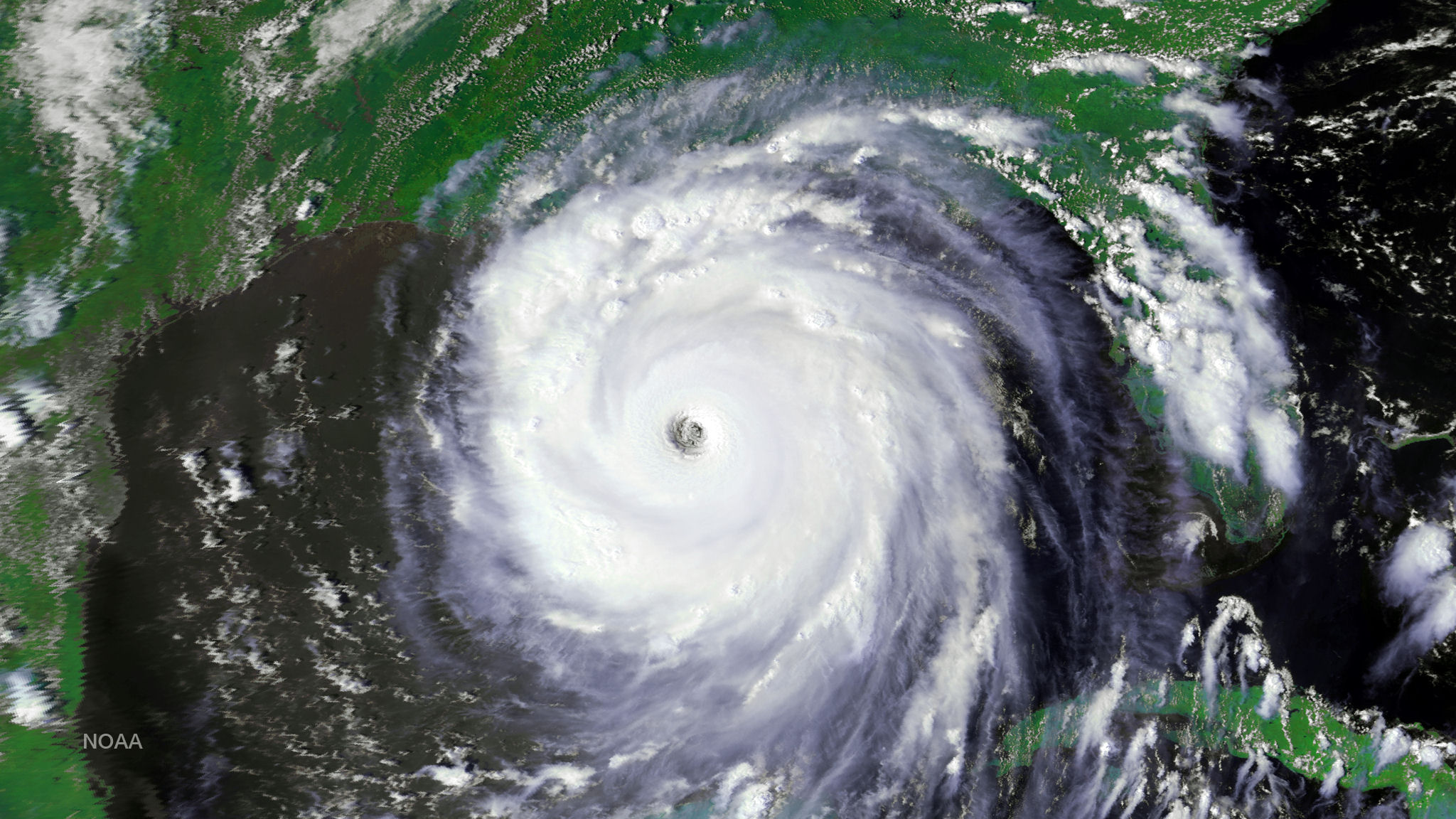
Image of Hurricane Katrina taken by NOAA-16 AVHRR instrument at 2010Z on August 28, 2005

The AVHRR/3 on the Advanced TIROS-N (ATN) NOAA K-N series of polar orbiting meteorological satellites is an improved instrument over previous AVHRRs. The AVHRR/3 adds a sixth channel and is a cross-track scanning instrument providing imaging and radiometric data in the visible, near-IR and infrared of the same area on the Earth. Data from the visible and near-IR channels provide information on vegetation, clouds, snow, and ice. Data from the near-IR and thermal channels provide information on the land and ocean surface temperature and radiative properties of clouds. Only five channels can be transmitted simultaneously with channels 3A and 3B being switched for day/night operation. The instrument produces data in High Resolution Picture Transmission (HRPT) mode at 1.1 km resolution or in Automatic Picture Transmission (APT) mode at a reduced resolution of 4 km. The AVHRR/3 scans 55.4° per scan line on either side of the orbital track and scans 360 lines per minute. The six channels are: 1) channel 1, visible (0.58-0.68 μm); 2) channel 2, near-IR (0.725-1.0 μm); 3) channel 3A, near-IR (1.58-1.64 μm); 4) channel 3B, infrared (3.55-3.93 μm; 5) channel 4, infrared (10.3-11.3 μm); and 6) channel 5 (11.5-12.5 μm).

=== High Resolution Infrared Sounder (HIRS/3) ===
The improved HIRS/3 on the Advanced TIROS-N (ATN) NOAA K-N series of polar orbiting weather satellites is a 20-channel, step-scanned, visible and infrared spectrometer designed to provide atmospheric temperature and moisture profiles. The HIRS/3 instrument is basically identical to the HIRS/2 flown on previous spacecraft except for changes in six spectral bands to improve the sounding accuracy. The HIRS/3 is used to derive water vapor, ozone, and cloud liquid water content. The instrument scans 49.5° on either side of the orbital track with a ground resolution at nadir of 17.4 km. The instrument produces 56 IFOVs for each 1,125 km scan line at 42 km between IFOVs along-track. The instrument consists of 19 infrared and 1 visible channel centered at 14.95, 14.71, 14.49, 14.22, 13.97, 13.64, 13.35, 11.11, 9.71, 12.45, 7.33, 6.52, 4.57, 4.52, 4.47, 4.45, 4.13, 4.0, 3.76, and 0.69 μm.

=== Advanced Microwave Sounding Unit (AMSU-A) ===
The AMSU was an instrument on the Advanced TIROS-N (ATN) NOAA K-N series of operational meteorological satellites. The AMSU consisted of two functionally independent units, AMSU-A and AMSU-B. The AMSU-A was a line-scan instrument designed to measure scene radiance in 15 channels, ranging from 23.8 to 89 GHz, to derive atmospheric temperature profiles from the Earth's surface to about 3 millibar pressure height. The instrument was a total power system having a field of view (FOV) of 3.3° at half-power points. The antenna provided cross track scan 50° on either side of the orbital track at nadir with a total of 30 IFOVs per scan line. The AMSU-A was calibrated on-board using a blackbody and space as references. The AMSU-A was physically divided into two separate modules which interface independently with the spacecraft. The AMSU-A1 contained all of the 5 mm oxygen channels (channels 3-14) and the 80 GHz channel. The AMSU-A2 module consisted of two low-frequency channels (channels 1 and 2). The 15 channels had a center frequency at: 23.8, 31.4, 50.3, 52.8, 53.6, 54.4, 54.94, 55.5, six at 57.29, and 89 GHz.

=== Advanced Microwave Sounding Unit (AMSU-B) ===
The AMSU was an instrument on the Advanced TIROS-N (ATN) NOAA K-N series of operational meteorological satellites. The AMSU consisted of two functionally independent units, AMSU-A and AMSU-B. The AMSU-B was a line-scan instrument designed to measure scene radiance in five channels, ranging from 89 GHz to 183 GHz for the computation of atmospheric water vapor profiles. The AMSU-B was a total power system with a field of view (FOV) of 1.1° at half-power points. The antenna provided a cross-track scan, scanning 50° on either side of the orbital track with 90 IFOVs per scan line. On-board calibration was accomplished with blackbody targets and space as references. The AMSU-B channels at the center frequency (GHz) were: 90, 157, and 3 channels at 183.31.

=== Space Environment Monitor-2 (SEM-2) ===
The SEM-2 on the Advanced TIROS-N (ATN) NOAA K-N series of polar orbiting meteorological satellites provides measurements to determine the population of the Earth's radiation belts and data on charged particle precipitation in the upper atmosphere as a result of solar activity. The SEM-2 consists of two separate sensors the Total Energy Detector (TED) and the Medium Energy Proton/Electron Detector (MEPED). In addition, the SEM-2 includes a common Data Processing Unit (DPU). The TED uses eight programmed swept electrostatic curved-plate analyzers to select particle type and energy and Channeltron detectors to measure the intensity in the selected energy bands. The particle energies range from 50 eV to 20 keV. The MEPED detects protons, electrons, and ions with energies from 30keV to several tens of MeV. The MEPED consists of four directional solid-state detector telescopes and four omnidirectional sensors. The DPU sorts and counts the events and the results are multiplexed and incorporated into the satellite telemetry system. Once received on the ground, the SEM-2 data is separated from the rest of the data and sent to the NOAA Space Environment Laboratory in Boulder, Colorado, for processing and dissemination.

=== Search and Rescue Satellite Aided Tracking System (SARSAT) ===
The SARSAT on the Advanced TIROS-N NOAA K-N series of polar orbiting meteorological satellites is designed to detect and locate Emergency Locator Transmitters (ELTs) and Emergency Position-Indicating Radio Beacons. The SARSAT instrumentation consists of two elements: the Search and Rescue Repeater (SARR) and the Search and Rescue Processor (SARP-2). The SARR is a radiofrequency (RF) system that accepts signals from emergency ground transmitters at three very high frequency (VHF/UHF) ranges (121.5 MHz, 243 MHz and 406.05 MHz) and translates, multiplexes, and transmits these signals at L-band frequency (1.544 GHz) to local Search and Rescue stations (LUTs or Local User Terminals) on the ground. The location of the transmitter is determined by retrieving the Doppler information in the relayed signal at the LUT. The SARP-2 is a receiver and processor that accepts digital data from emergency ground transmitters at UHF and demodulates, processes, stores, and relays the data to the SARR where they are combined with the three SARR signals and transmitted via L-band frequency to local stations.

=== ARGOS Data Collection System (Argos DCS-2) ===
The DCS-2 on the Advanced TIROS-N (ATN) NOAA K-N series of polar orbiting meteorological satellites is a random-access system for the collection of meteorological data from in situ platforms (moveable and fixed). The Argos DCS-2 collects telemetry data using a one-way RF link from data collection platforms (such as buoys, free-floating balloons and remote weather stations) and processes the inputs for on-board storage and later transmission from the spacecraft. For free-floating platforms, the DCS-2 system determines the position to within 5 to 8 km RMS and velocity to an accuracy of 1.0 to 1.6 mps RMS. The DCS-2 measures the in-coming signal frequency and time. The formatted data are stored on the satellite for transmission to NOAA stations. The DCS-2 data is stripped from the GAC data by NOAA / NESDIS and sent to the Argos center at CNES in France for processing, distribution to users, and archival.

=== Solar Backscatter Ultraviolet Radiometer (SBUV/2) ===
The SBUV/2 on the Advanced TIROS-N (ATN) NOAA K-N series of polar orbiting meteorological satellites is a dual monochromator ultraviolet grating spectrometer for stratospheric ozone measurements. The SBUV/2 is designed to measure scene radiance and solar spectral irradiance in the ultraviolet spectral range from 160 to 406 nm. Measurements are made in discrete mode or sweep mode. In discrete mode, measurements are made in 12 spectral bands from which the total ozone and vertical distribution of ozone are derived. In the sweep mode, a continuous spectral scan from 160 to 406 nm is made primarily for computation of ultraviolet solar spectral irradiance. The 12 spectral channels are (μm): 252.0, 273.61, 283.1, 287.7, 292,29, 297.59, 301.97, 305.87, 312.57, 317.56, 331.26, and 339.89.

== Telecommunications ==
The TIP formats low bit rate instruments and telemetry to tape recorders and direct read-out. The MIRP process high data rate AVHRR to tape recorders (GAC) and direct read-out (HRPT and LAC). On-board recorders can store 110 minutes of GAC, 10 minutes HRPT and 250 minutes TIP.

== Anomaly, Decommissioning and Breakup ==
The Automatic Picture Transmission (APT) of NOAA-16 became inoperable due to sensor degradation on 15 November 2000, and the High Resolution Picture Transmission (HRPT) was done via STX-1 (1698 MHz) starting on 9 November 2010.

On June 6, 2014, NOAA-16 controllers were unable to establish contact with the satellite due to an undefined "critical anomaly". After extensive engineering analysis and recovery efforts it was determined that recovery of the mission was not possible. It was decommissioned on 9 June 2014. On 25 November 2015, at 08:16 UTC, the Combined Space Operations Center (JSpOC) identified a possible breakup of NOAA 16 (#26536). All associated objects have been added to conjunction assessment screenings, and satellite operators was notified of close approaches between the debris and active satellites. The JSpOC catalogs the debris objects when sufficient data is available. As of 26 March 2016, 275 pieces of debris were being tracked.

The debris caused no danger for other satellites at the time and there was no indication that a collision had caused the breakup of NOAA 16.

Debris distribution suggested that battery rupture as a possible cause of the breakup similar to Defense Meteorological Satellite Program's DMSP F-13, F-11, and NOAA 17 breakups. DMSP F-13 was known to have battery overcharge issues.
