= Defense Weather Satellite System =

The Defense Weather Satellite System (DWSS) was a United States Department of Defense weather satellite system to have been built by Northrop Grumman Corporation projected for launch in 2018. In January 2012, the US Air Force cancelled the program. It was replaced with the Weather System Follow-on Microwave (WSF-M).

DWSS was a follow-on for the Defense Meteorological Satellite Program (DMSP) mission. The DWSS, together with the still continuing Joint Polar Satellite System (JPSS) project, was to replace the National Polar-orbiting Operational Environmental Satellite System (NPOESS) project which itself was cancelled in January 2010.
