= Defense Meteorological Satellite Program =

United States Department of Defense weather monitoring program

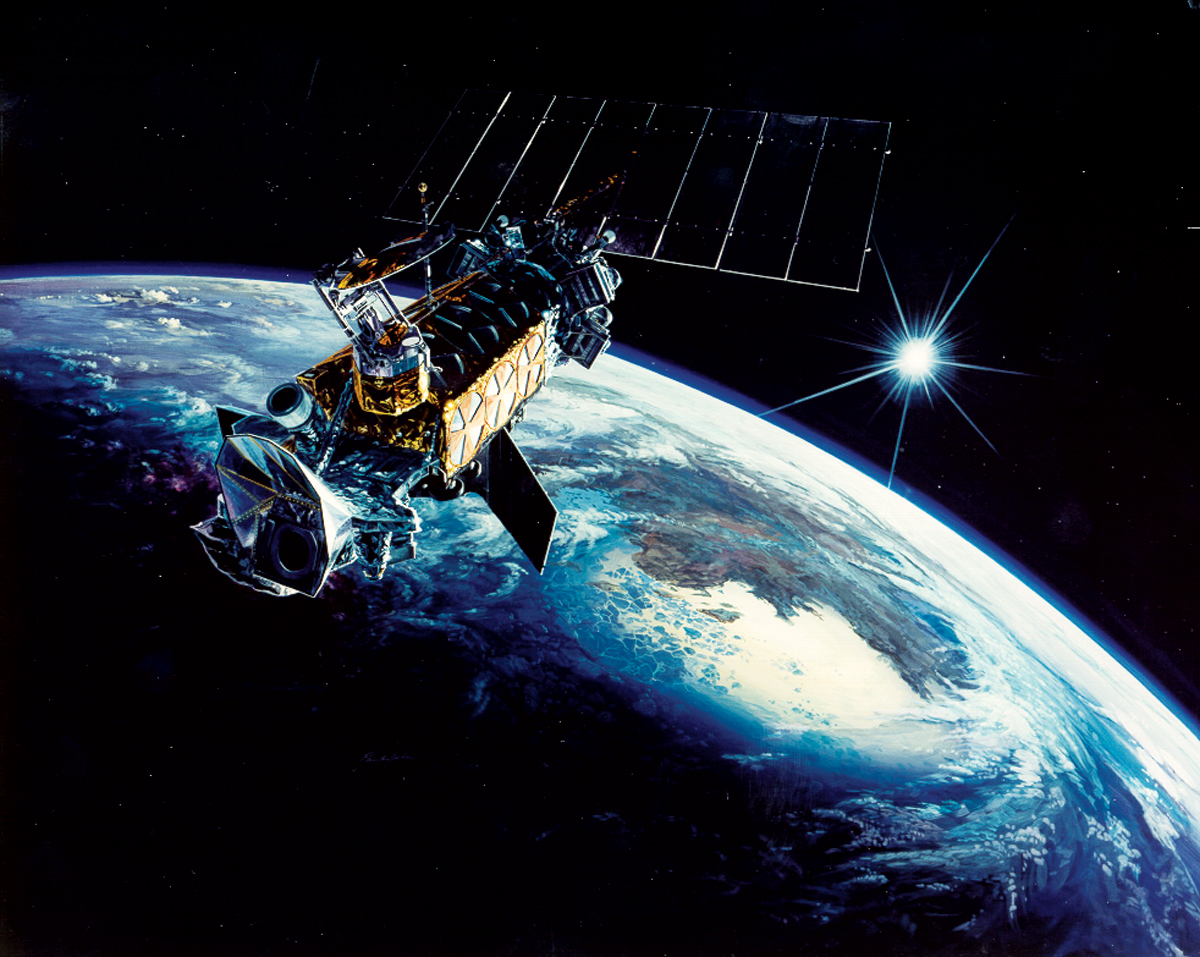
- Artist rendition of a DMSP-5D2 satellite in orbit

Program overview
- Country: United States
- Organization: United States Space Force
- Purpose: Earth monitoring
- Status: Ongoing

Program history
- First flight: DMSP-1 F2; 23 August 1962
- Last flight: DMSP 5D-3/F19; 3 April 2014
- Launch site: Vandenberg Space Force Base

The Defense Meteorological Satellite Program (DMSP) monitors meteorological, oceanographic, and solar-terrestrial physics for the United States Department of Defense. The program is managed by the United States Space Force with on-orbit operations provided by the National Oceanic and Atmospheric Administration (NOAA). The (originally classified) mission of the satellites was revealed in March 1973. They provide cloud cover imagery from polar orbits that are Sun-synchronous at nominal altitude of 830 km (520 mi).

All data ingestion, processing, and distribution by Fleet Numerical Meteorology and Oceanography Center (FNMOC) was set to be permanently terminated as of June 30, 2025 due to a "significant cybersecurity risk." However, the Earth Science Division Director at NASA, Dr. Karen St. Germain, requested that the decommission be delayed due to the short notice provided. FNMOC now expects to continue to ingest and disseminate data until July 31, 2025.

== History ==
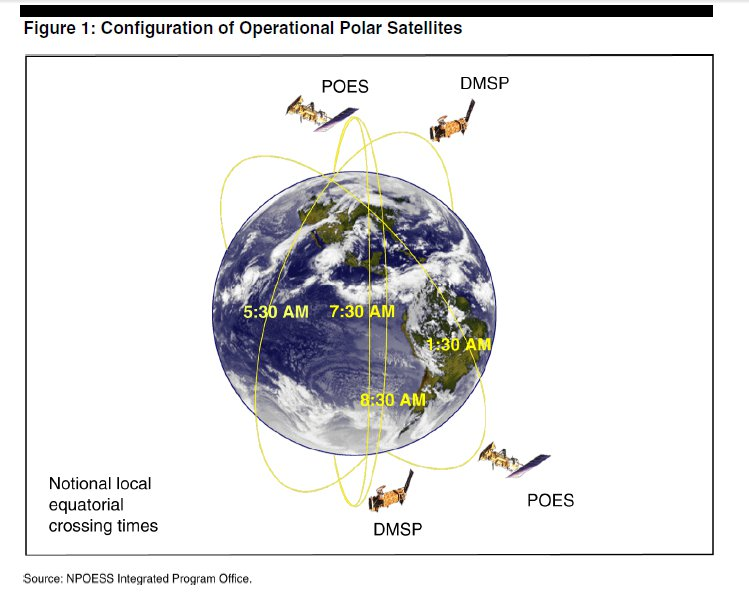
DMSP and POES orbits shown in a GAO diagram

Early in 1963 The Aerospace Corporation recommended that the U.S. Air Force develop a dedicated military meteorological satellite, and the Defense Department agreed. The main emphasis would be on cloud-cover photography, but planners expected to add more sophisticated equipment when it became available. Later, when civilian weather satellites improved their capabilities and could satisfy most military requirements, the Defense Department continued to prefer a separate system responsive to the "dynamic" needs of the military. As a result, the Air Force embarked on the first segment of what became known initially as the Defense Satellite Applications Program (DSAP), or Program 417.

During the 1960s, one of the most important projects that the United States civil space program was involved in dealt with meteorology and weather forecasting. Unbeknownst to many, the U.S. military services were also starting up a weather satellite program. This program, the DMSP, would relay important weather and climate data to the military for more effective operations. From the onset of the DMSP program, knowledge of its existence was limited to "need-to-know" personnel. The United States Congress had assigned a substantial budget towards the civil weather satellite program; if knowledge of a second military program came out, it would have been hard for the military to justify it.

FAIR Operations room c. 1977

Initial operations of early DMSP systems provided radio return of cloud-cover imagery for planning of U.S. high-resolution photographic reconnaissance and surveillance missions, which utilized film-return systems. DMSP satellites operated in a Sun-synchronous orbit; passing over the north and south poles, the satellite would see different strips of the Earth at the same local time each day. The DMSP satellites had periods of roughly 101.0 minutes, so they would orbit the Earth 14.3 times in 24 hours. This period combined with the Sun-synchronous orbit would have the satellite pass over the whole surface of the planet twice a day.

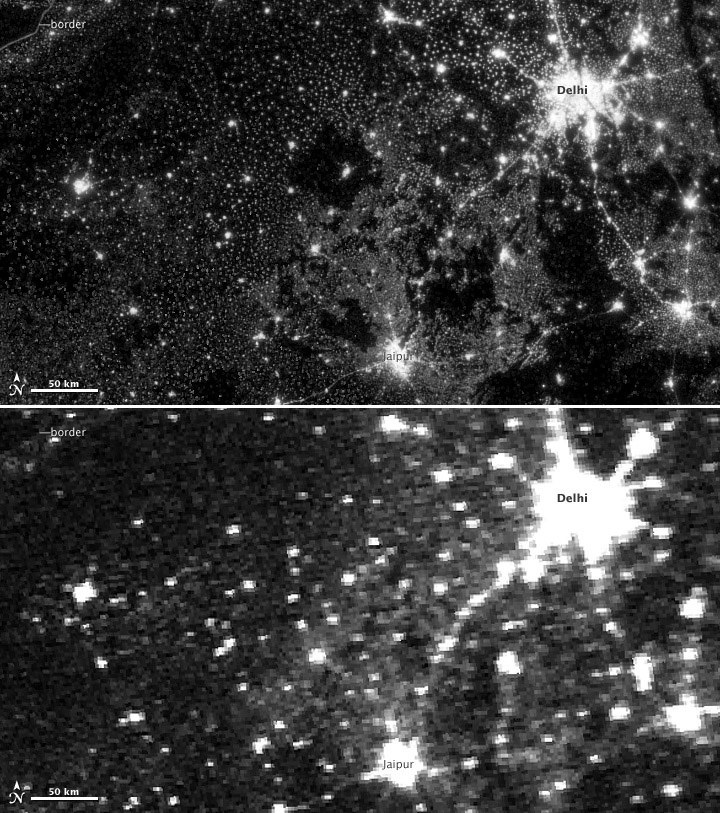
Comparison of Visible Infrared Imaging Radiometer Suite (VIIRS) and Operational Linescan System (OLS)

The images acquired were relayed to the Earth and received by two command and readout stations during each pass over the continental United States, established at retired Nike missile sites located near Fairchild Air Force Base in Washington State and Loring Air Force Base in Maine. From these sites, the images were then sent to Air Force Global Weather Central (AFGWC) located at Offutt Air Force Base, Nebraska. Images would then be processed, forming a mosaic representing the cloud patterns that were observed from the orbiting satellites. Meteorologists could then provide flight crews and other commanders with up-to-date observations for their particular missions. Further advancements enabled data to be collected in the visual spectrum, down to a half-moonlit scene. Infrared processing enabled night viewing. Other enhancements increased on-board processing; this includes multiple on-board computers and expanded power requirements.

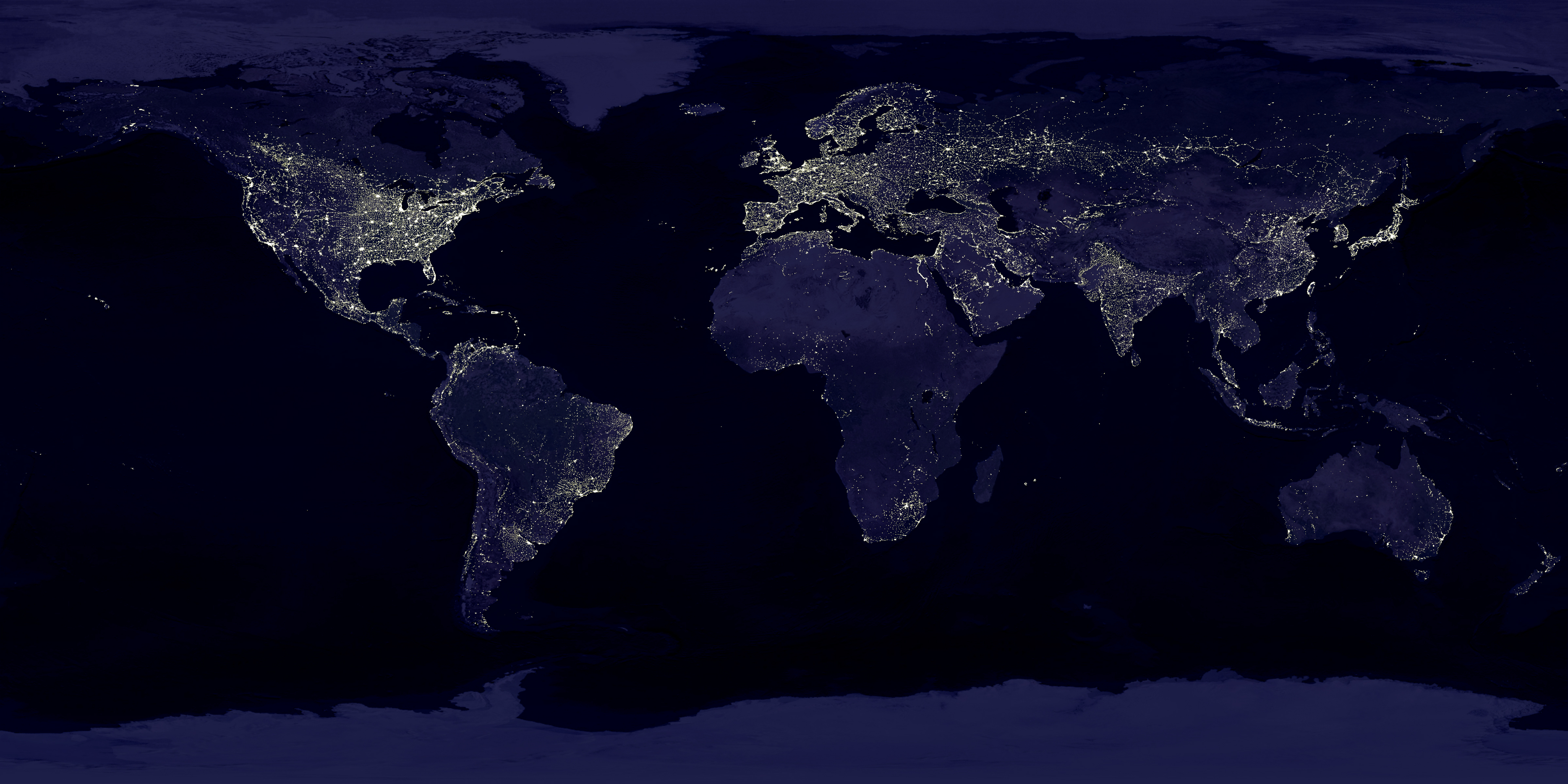
Rendering of lights on Earth's surface created using DMSP observations between 1994 and 1995

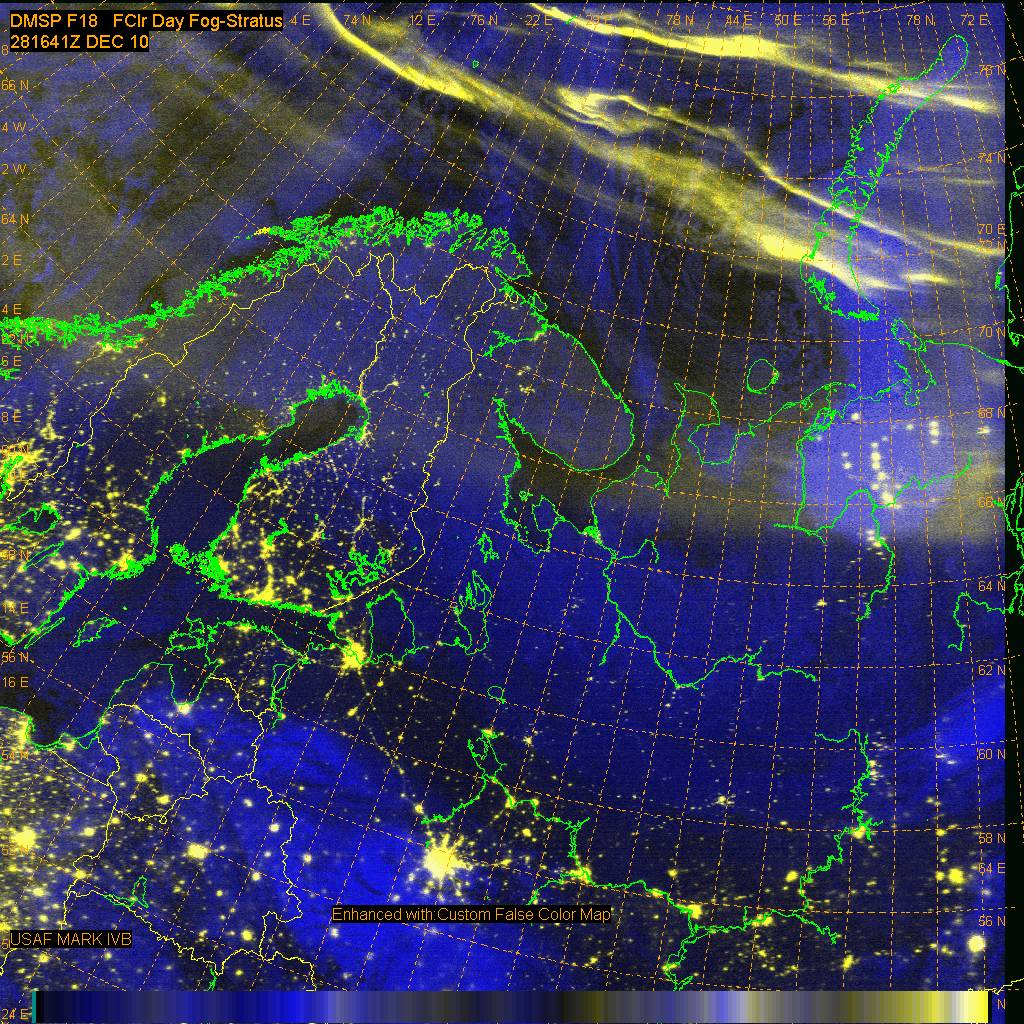
DMSP images of Auroral bands circling north of Scandinavia in December 2010

Now in its fifth decade of service, the DMSP program has proven itself to be a valuable tool in scheduling and protecting military operations on land, at sea, and in the air. Because the Air Force weather satellite program began with the mission of providing weather data for Strategic Air Command and National Reconnaissance Office (NRO), DSAP remained classified until 17 April 1973, when Secretary of the Air Force Dr. John L. McLucas decided that the Defense Department's decision to use satellite weather data in the Vietnam conflict and to provide it to both the Commerce Department and the general scientific community warranted declassification of the DSAP mission and release of some of its performance data. In December 1973 the Defense Department changed the name to the Defense Meteorological Satellite Program (DMSP). On 1 June 1998, the control and maintenance of the satellites were transferred to National Oceanic and Atmospheric Administration (NOAA) in order to reduce costs.

DMSP was to be replaced by the Defense Weather Satellite System (DWSS) but that was cancelled in 2012. In 2017, the Air Force awarded a contract to build the first of the new defense weather satellites, the Weather System Follow-on Microwave (WSF-M) satellite.

== Losses of satellites ==
=== 2004 explosion ===
In 2004 the USAF weather satellite DMSP Block 5D-2 F-11 (S-12) or DMSP-11, launched in 1991 and retired in 1995, exploded in orbit with debris objects generated. It seems likely the fragmentation was due to either a battery explosion or to residual fuel in the attitude control system. Later, propulsion was identified as the "assessed cause" of DMSP-11 explosion.

=== 2015 explosion and debris field ===
On 3 February 2015, the 13th DMSP satellite — DMSP-F13 launched in 1995 — exploded while in a Sun-synchronous polar orbit leaving a debris field of at least 43 to 100 large fragments and more than 50,000 pieces smaller than 1 millimeter. The Joint Space Operations Center at Vandenberg Space Force Base, Lompoc, California is monitoring the expanding debris field, and "will issue conjunction warnings if necessary". The cause of the explosion was the rupturing of an onboard battery due to a design flaw (no collision with another object took place).

=== 2016 failure of DMSP 19 without replacement ===
On 11 February 2016, a power failure left both the command-and-control subsystem and its backup without the ability to reach the satellite's processor, according to the U.S. Air Force Space Command investigation released in July 2016 that also announced that DMSP 5D-3/F19 was considered to be 'lost'. The satellite's data can still be used, until it ceases pointing the sensors towards the Earth. The satellite was the most recent on-orbit, having been launched on 3 April 2014.

The failure only left F16, F17 and F18 – all significantly past their expected 3–5 year lifespan – operational. F19's planned replacement was not carried out because Congress ordered the destruction of the already constructed F20 probe to save money by not having to pay its storage costs. It is unlikely that a new DMSP satellite would be launched before 2023; by then the three remaining satellites should no longer be operational.

=== 2016 explosion ===
In October 2016, the 12th DMSP satellite - DMSP-F12 launched in 1994 - exploded in orbit. The satellite had similar battery as the one that exploded in the DMSP-13 satellite, thus raising suspicions that DMSP-12 explosion was also caused by battery problems. At the time the cause of DMSP-12's explosion was however unknown, although a collision with another object did not seem to be the cause. Apparently, very little debris (just one trackable piece) was generated in DMSP-12 explosion. DMSP-12 was decommissioned in 2008.

=== Near collision ===
In January 2017, the Joint Space Operations Center announced that two non-maneuverable satellites would come dangerously close, with a collision probability as high as 44%. DMSP F15 and Meteor 1-26 were considered to be the prime candidates for the encounter. The operations center, which announced the possible collision, didn't identify the satellites involved but third party observers determined the most likely candidates. The two did not collide.

=== NOAA 16 and 17 ===
The NOAA-16 and NOAA-17 weather satellites were based on the same technology as DMSP satellites. NOAA-16 broke up in November 2015, and NOAA-17 disintegrated in orbit on 10 March 2021.

=== 2024 explosion ===
The DMSP 5D-2/F14 (USA-131), launched 4 Apr 1997 and decommissioned in 2020, exploded in orbit in December 2024.

== Launch history ==
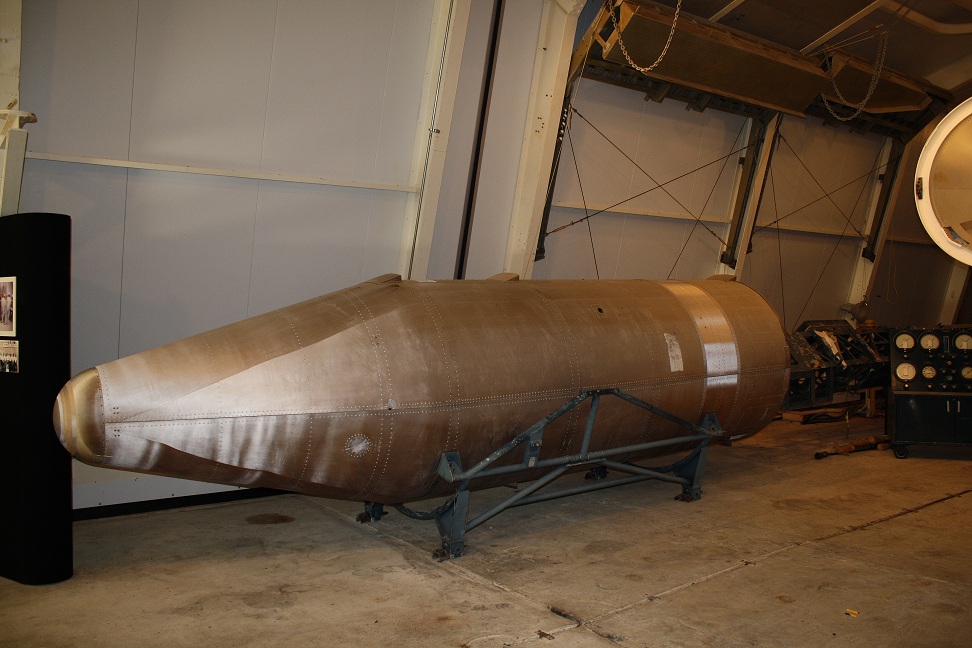
DMSP 4A shroud at SLC-10

DMSP was initially known as Program 35. The first successful launch of a Program 35 spacecraft used a Scout X-2 rocket lifting off from Point Arguello near Vandenberg Space Force Base on 23 August 1962. This was P35-2, the earlier P35-1 launch on 24 May 1962 had failed to reach orbit. All five Program 35 launch attempts using Scout launch vehicle, including the two successes, were made from Vandenberg SLC-5. Other early launches were conducted using Thor-Burner launch vehicles, with Altair or Burner II upper stages. Program 35 had by this time been renamed the Data Acquisition and Processing Program, and the DAPP acronym is sometimes used for these satellites. Eight satellites were launched using Atlas E launch vehicles between 1982 and 1995. Three were launched aboard Titan II vehicles between 1997 and 2003. One has been launched on a Delta IV rocket.

The most recent launch of a DMSP satellite, DMSP-F19, occurred on 3 April 2014, from Vandenberg aboard an Atlas V launch vehicle.

=== Block 1 ===
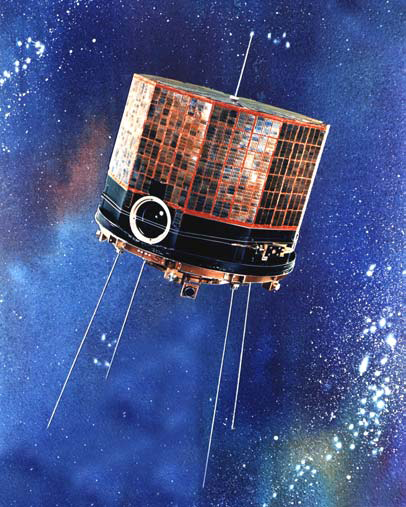
DMSP 1 Satellite

The DSAP-1 (Defense Satellite Application Program Block 1) satellites series, also known as P-35, was the first series of military meteorological satellites of the United States. The project designation P-698BH was used concurrently with P-35 from June 1962 and P-35 became P-417 in October 1962. The designation DMSP-1 (Defense Meteorological Satellite Program Block 1) was retroactively assigned to these satellites.

Block 1
Name	ID NORAD #	Launch date	Launch vehicle	Launch site	Mass (kg)	Period (min)	Perigee (km)	Apogee (km)	Inclination (degrees)	Status	Alt. names
DMSP-1 F1		23 May 1962	Scout	Va LC-D	45-55					Failed to orbit; 2nd stage exploded	Program 35 F-1, P-698BH F1, DSAP-1 F1
DMSP-1 F2	1962-039A; 00369	23 August 1962	Scout	Va LC-D	45-55	97	557	694	98.4	Success; EOM 11 Jun 1963	Program 35 F-2, P-698BH F2, DSAP-1 F2
DMSP-1 F3	1963-005A; 00533	19 February 1963	Scout	Va LC-D	45-55					Improper orbit; first DMSP with infrared system	Program 35 F-3, P-417 F3, DSAP-1 F3
DMSP-1 F4		26 April 1963	Scout	Va LC-D	45-55					Failed to orbit; 3rd stage exploded	Program 35 F-4, P-417 F4, DSAP-1 F4
DMSP-1 F5		27 September 1963	Scout	Va LC-D	45-55					Failed to orbit; 3rd stage failure	Program 35 F-5, P-417 F5, DSAP-1 F5
DMSP-1 F6	1964-002B; 00734	19 January 1964	Thor-DM21 Agena-D	Va 75-1-2	45-55	100	785	807	99	EOM 10 July 1964	Program 35 F-6, DSAP-1 F6, OPS 3367A, P-417 F6
DMSP-1 F7	1964-002C; 00735	19 Jan 1964	Thor-DM21 Agena-D	Va 75-1-2	45-55	100	788	811	99	EOM 17 Mar 1965	Program 35 F-7, DSAP-1 F7, OPS 3367B, P-417 F7
DMSP 1 F8	1964-031A; 00812	17 Jun 1964	Thor-DM21 Agena-D	Va 75-3-4	45-55	101	809	817	99.7	EOM 16 Feb 1966	Program 35 F-8, DSAP-1 F8, OPS 4467A, P-417 F8
DMSP-1 F9	1964-031B; 00813	17 Jun 1964	Thor-Agena D	Va 75-3-4	45-55	101	811	820	99.7	EOM 15 Oct 1965	Program 35 F-9, DSAP-1 F9, OPS 4467B, P-417 F9
DMSP-1 F10	1965-003A; 00973	19 Jan 1965	Thor-LV2D Burner-1(1), (Thor-DSV2S MG-18)	Va 4300-B6	45-55					failed to separate from upper stage	Program 35 F-10, DSAP-1 F10, OPS 7040, P-417 F10
DMSP-1 F11	1965-021A; 01273	18 Feb 1965	Thor-LV2D Burner-1(1), (Thor-DSV2S MG-18)	Va 4300-B6	45-55					EOM 15 Oct 1965	Program 35 F-11, DSAP-1 F11, OPS 7353, P-417 F11

=== Block 2 ===
The DSAP-2 (Defense Satellite Application Program Block 2) satellites series consisted of three modified DSAP-1 satellites, retaining the shape and dimension of the earlier series, featuring improved infrared radiometers. The designation DMSP-2 (Defense Meteorological Satellite Program Block 2) was retroactively assigned to these satellites.

Block 2
Name	ID NORAD #	Launch date	Launch vehicle	Launch site	Mass (kg)	Period (min)	Perigee (km)	Apogee (km)	Inclination (deg)	Status	Alt. name
DMSP-2 F1	1965-072A; 01580	10 Sep 1965	Thor-LV2D Burner-1(2), (Thor-DSV2S Altair-3)	Va 4300-B6	73	100	632	971	98.7		DSAP-2 F1, OPS 8068
DMSP-2 F2		6 Jan 1966	Thor-LV2D Burner-1(2), (Thor-DSV2S Altair-3)	Va 4300-B6	73					Launch failed	DSAP-2 F2, OPS 2394
DMSP-2 F3	1966-026A; 02125	31 Mar 1966	Thor-LV2D Burner-1(2), (Thor-DSV2S Altair-3)	Va 4300-B6	73	98	594	820	98.3		DSAP-2 F3, OPS 0340

=== Block 3 ===
The single DSAP-3 (Defense Satellite Application Program Block 3) was a modified DSAP-2 satellite to provide experimental tactical access to weather data, for which a tactical readout station was built near Saigon. The designation DMSP-3 (Defense Meteorological Satellite Program Block 3) was retroactively assigned to this satellite.

Block 3
Name	ID NORAD #	Launch date	Launch vehicle	Launch site	Mass (kg)	Period (min)	Perigee (km)	Apogee (km)	Inclination (deg)	Status	Alt. name
DMSP-3 F1	1965-038A; 01377	20 May 1965	Thor-LV2D Burner-1(2), (Thor-DSV2S Altair-3)	Va 4300-B6						Tactical orientation for use over Vietnam	DSAP-3 F1, OPS 8386

=== Block 4A ===
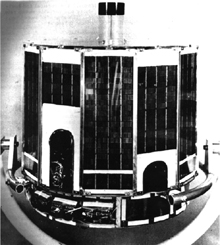
DMSP 4 Satellite

The DSAP-4A (Defense Satellite Application Program Block 4A) satellites series consisted of ten satellites, launched between 1965 and 1967. The designation DMSP-4A (Defense Meteorological Satellite Program Block 4A) was retroactively assigned to these satellites.

Block 4A
Name	ID/Reference NORAD #	Launch date	Launch vehicle	Mass (kg)	Period (min)	Perigee (km)	Apogee (km)	Inclination (deg)	Status	Alt. name
DMSP 4A 1	1965-003A; 00973	19 Jan 1965	Thor-Altair	250	97.7	471	822	98.8	Decayed 13 Jul 1979; 1st use of Thor-Altair	OPS-7040
DMSP 4A 2	1965-021A; 01273	18 Mar 1965	Thor-Altair	250	94.4	442	533	99.0	Decayed 31 Dec 1989	OPS-7353
DMSP 4A 3	1965-038A; 01377	20 May 1965	Thor-Altair	250	98.7	527	829	98.2	Decayed 09 Mar 2012	OPS-8386
DMSP 4A 4	1965-072A; 01580	10 Sep 1965	Thor-Altair	250	101.5	639	1,013	99.0	In orbit	OPS-8068
DMSP 4A 5	None	6 Jan 1966	Thor-Altair	250	-----	-----	-----	-----	Failed to orbit	-----
DMSP 4A 6	1966-026A; 02125	30 Mar 1966	Thor-Altair	250	99.9	613	883	98.5	In orbit	OPS-0340
DMSP 4A 7	1966-082A; 02418	16 Sep 1966	Thor-Burner II	420	100.4	680	872	98.8	In orbit; 1st use of Burner II	OPS-6026
DMSP 4A 8	1967-010A; 02669	8 Feb 1967	Thor-Burner II	420	101.3	778	854	98.9	In orbit	OPS-6073
DMSP 4A 9	1967-080A; 02920	23 Aug 1967	Thor-Burner II	420	102.2	822	878	98.8	In orbit	OPS-7202
DMSP 4A 10	1967-096A; 02980	11 Oct 1967	Thor-Burner II	420	99.5	650	822	99.2	In orbit	OPS-1264

=== Block 5A ===
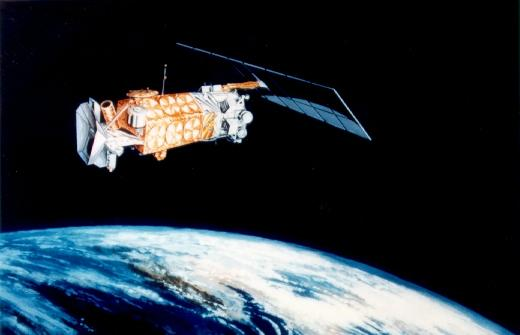
DMSP 5 Satellite

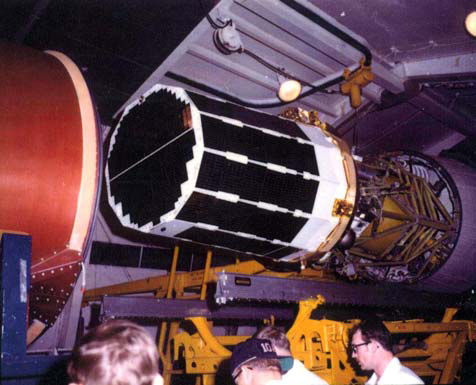
DMSP Block-5A Satellite

The DSAP-5A (Defense Satellite Application Program Block 5A) satellites series consisted of six satellites, launched between 1968 and 1971. The designation DMSP-5A (Defense Meteorological Satellite Program Block 5A) was retroactively assigned to these satellites.

Block 5A
Name	ID/Reference NORAD #	Launch date	Launch vehicle	Mass (kg)	Period (min)	Perigee (km)	Apogee (km)	Inclination (deg)	Status	Alt. name
DMSP 5A 1	1968-042A; 03266	23 May 1968	Thor-Burner II	420	101.9	809	888	98.8	In orbit	OPS-7869
DMSP 5A 2	1968-092A; 03510	23 Oct 1968	Thor-Burner II	420	101.2	792	838	98.5	In orbit	OPS-4078
DMSP 5A 3	1969-062A; 04047	23 Jul 1969	Thor-Burner II	420	101.1	775	844	98.5	In orbit	OPS-1127
DMSP 5A 4	1970-012A; 04331	11 Feb 1970	Thor-Burner II	420	101.1	759	850	98.8	In orbit	OPS-0054
DMSP 5A 5	1970-070A; 04512	3 Sep 1970	Thor-Burner II	420	101.9	764	874	99.1	Reentered 21 Sep 1970	OPS-0203
DMSP 5A 6	1971-012A; 04953	17 Feb 1971	Thor-Burner II	420	100.6	755	817	98.3	In orbit	OPS-5268

=== Block 5B ===
The DSAP-5B (Defense Satellite Application Program Block 5B) satellites series consisted of five satellites, launched between 1971 and 1974. The designation DMSP-5B (Defense Meteorological Satellite Program Block 5B) was assigned to these satellites.

Block 5B
Name	ID NORAD #	Launch date	Launch vehicle	Mass (kg)	Period (min)	Perigee (km)	Apogee (km)	Inclination (deg)	Status	Alt. name
DMSP 5B 1	1971-087A; 05557	14 Oct 1971	Thor-Burner II	513	101.4	782	865	99.1	In orbit	OPS-4311
DMSP 5B 2	1972-018A; 05903	24 Mar 1972	Thor-Burner II	513	101.5	787	868	99.1	In orbit	OPS-5058
DMSP 5B 3	1972-089A; 06275	9 Nov 1972	Thor-Burner II	513	101.4	797	855	98.8	In orbit	OPS-7323
DMSP 5B 4	1973-054A; 06787	17 Aug 1973	Thor-Burner II	513	101.2	795	839	98.5	In orbit	OPS-8364
DMSP 5B 5	1974-015A; 07218	16 Mar 1974	Thor-Burner IIA	513	101.2	767	859	99.0	In orbit	OPS-8579

=== Block 5C ===
The DSAP-5C (Defense Satellite Application Program Block 5C) satellites series consisted of three satellites, launched between 1974 and 1976. The designation DMSP-5C (Defense Meteorological Satellite Program Block 5C) was assigned to these satellites.

Block 5C
Name	ID NORAD #	Launch date	Launch vehicle	Mass (kg)	Period (min)	Perigee (km)	Apogee (km)	Inclination (deg)	Status	Alt. name	End of Mission
DMSP 5C 1	1974-063A; 07411	9 Aug 1974	Thor-Burner IIA	513	101.5	792	862	98.7	In orbit	OPS-6983	1 Dec 1977
DMSP 5C 2	1975-043A; 07816	24 May 1975	Thor-Burner II	513	101.7	797	881	98.7	In orbit	OPS-6229	30 November 1977
DMSP 5C 3	1976-016A; 08696	19 Feb 1976	Thor-Burner II	513	89.0	90	355	98.9	Decayed 19 Feb 1976	OPS-5140	Failed to orbit. Improper Fuel Loading

=== Block 5D ===
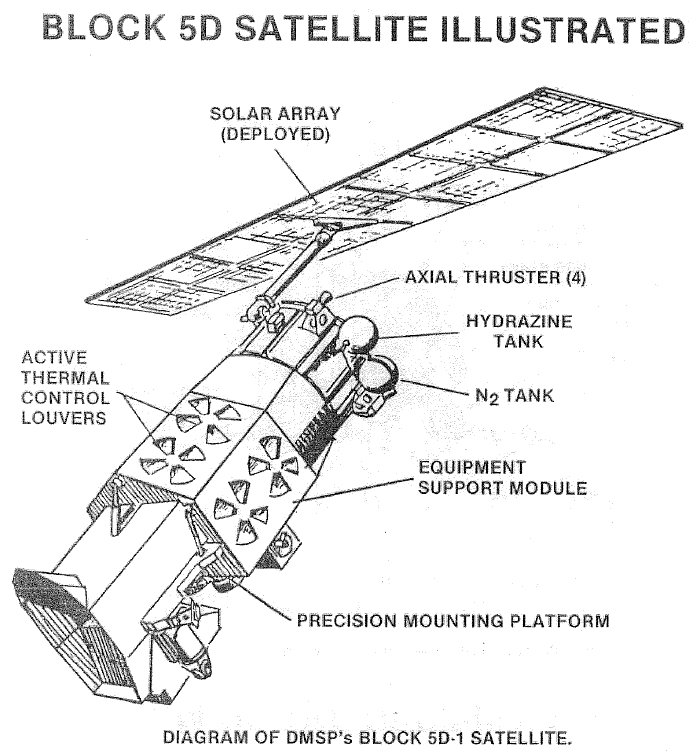
DMSP 5D-1 diagram

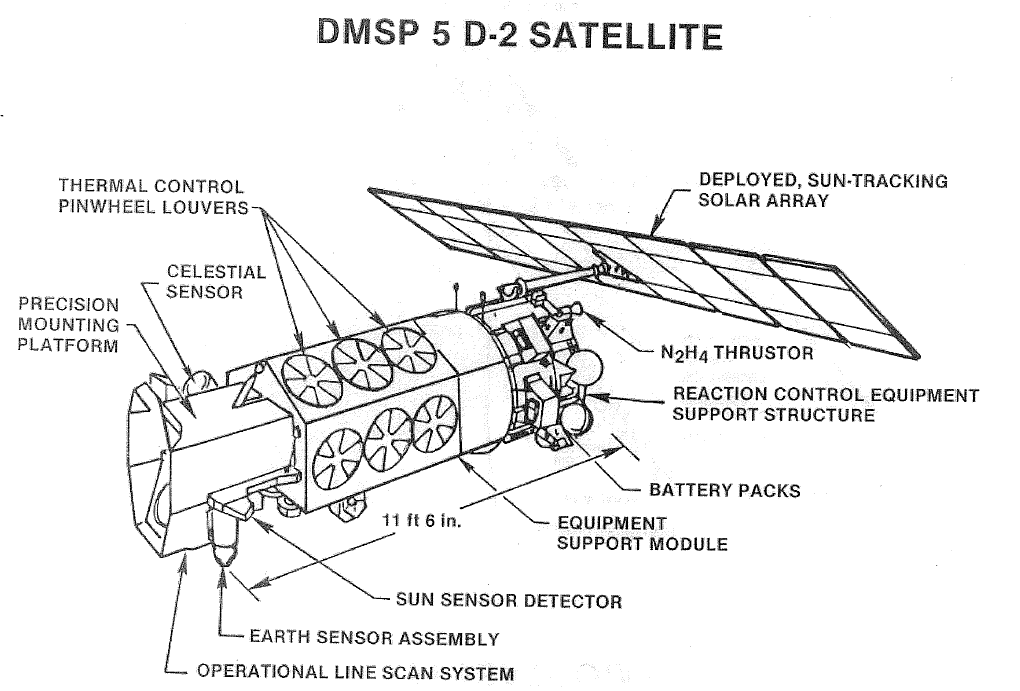
DMSP 5D-2 diagram

The DSAP-5D (Defense Satellite Application Program Block 5D) satellites series consisted of nineteen satellites, launched between 1976 and 2014. The designation DMSP-5D (Defense Meteorological Satellite Program Block 5D) was assigned to these satellites.

In 2015, Congress voted to terminate the DMSP program and to scrap the DMSP 5D-3/F20 satellite, ordering the Air Force to move on to a next-generation system. The Air Force had intended to keep DMSP F20 in climate-controlled storage at a Lockheed Martin clean room in Sunnyvale, California, for a time in case it needed to be called up for launch in the coming years, and in the aftermath of the failure of DMSP 5D-3/F19, the USAF was reconsidering the future of DMSP-5D3 F-20. However, in late 2016, the USAF began scrapping DMSP-5D3 F-20.

Block 5D
Name	ID NORAD #	Launch date	Launch vehicle	Mass (kg)	Period (min)	Perigee (km)	Apogee (km)	Inclination (deg)	Status	Alt. name
DMSP 5D-1/F1	1976-091A; 09415	11 Sep 1976	Thor-Burner II	513	101.3	806	834	98.6	In orbit; aka AMS 1	OPS-5721
DMSP 5D1/F2	1977-044A; 10033	5 Jun 1977	Thor-Burner II	513	101.3	789	853	99.0	In orbit; aka AMS 2	OPS-5644
DMSP 5D-1/F3	1978-042A; 10820	1 May 1978	Thor-Burner II	513	101.1	804	817	98.6	In orbit; aka AMS 3	OPS-6182
DMSP 5D-1/F4	1979-050A; 11389	6 Jun 1979	Thor-Burner II	513	101.2	806	828	98.7	In orbit; aka AMS 4	OPS-5390
DMSP 5D-1/F5	None	14 July 1980	Thor	513	-----	-----	-----	-----	Failed to orbit	-----
DMSP 5D-2/F6	1982-118A; 13736	21 Dec 1982	Atlas E	751	101.2	811	823	98.7	In orbit; aka AMS 5	OPS-9845
DMSP 5D-2/F7	1983-113A; 14506	18 Nov 1983	Atlas E	751	101.4	815	832	98.7	In orbit	OPS-1294
DMSP 5D-2/F8	1987-053A; 18123	20 Jun 1987	Atlas E	823	96.89	564	653	97.6	In orbit; first to carry SSM/I microwave imaging sensor to see through clouds	USA-26
DMSP 5D-2/F9	1988-006A; 18822	3 Feb 1988	Atlas E	823	101.3	815	826	98.7	In orbit	USA-29
DMSP 5D-2/F10	1990-105A; 20978	1 Dec 1990	Atlas E	823	100.6	729	845	98.9	Operational, but not in desired orbit	USA-68
DMSP 5D-2/F11	1991-082A; 21798	28 Nov 1991	Atlas E	823	101.9	835	855	98.9	Exploded in orbit in 2004	USA-73
DMSP 5D-2/F12	1994-057A; 23233	29 Aug 1994	Atlas E	830	101.9	839	856	98.9	Exploded in orbit in 2016	USA-106
DMSP 5D-2/F13	1995-015A; 23533	24 March 1995	Atlas E	830	101.9	845	854	98.8	Exploded in orbit in February 2015	USA-109
DMSP 5D-2/F14	1997-012A; 24753	4 Apr 1997	Titan 23G	830	101.9	842	855	98.9	Decommissioned in 2020. Exploded in orbit in December 2024	USA-131
DMSP 5D-3/F15	1999-067A; 25991	12 Dec 1999	Titan 23G		101.8	837	851	98.9	In orbit and decommissioned in 2020 (5D-2 suite of instruments)	USA-147
DMSP 5D-3/F16	2003-048A; 28054	18 Oct 2003	Titan 23G		101.9	843	853	98.9	In orbit	USA-172
DMSP 5D-3/F17	2006-050A; 29522	04 Nov 2006	Delta IV		102	841	855	98.8	In orbit	USA-191
DMSP 5D-3/F18	2009-057A; 35951	18 Oct 2009	Atlas V	1200	101.9	843	857	98.9	In orbit. Included a 2.4 hour post-spacecraft mission test of cryogenic fluid management on the Centaur upper stage.	USA-210
DMSP 5D-3/F19	2014-015A; 39630	3 Apr 2014	Atlas V		101.85	840	853	98.85	F19 stopped responding to commands on 11 February 2016 due to a power failure affecting an encrypted command-and-control system. The satellite continued to report telemetry and some real-time weather data, but could no longer be commanded. The data was reported as tactical data to field units. The attitude control was lost in October 2017, thus ending the mission. F19 has started to break apart, creating several pieces of debris.	USA-249

== See also ==
- NPOESS - the National Polar-orbiting Operational Environmental Satellite System
- Space debris
