= NPOESS =

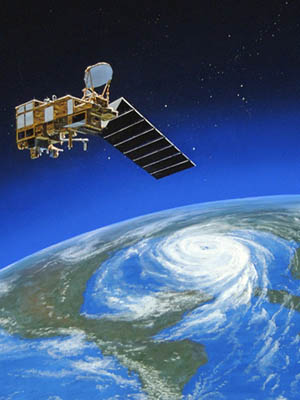
Artist's concept of a future NPOESS satellite, 2006.

The National Polar-orbiting Operational Environmental Satellite System (NPOESS) was to be the United States' next-generation satellite system that would monitor the Earth's weather, atmosphere, oceans, land, and near-space environment. NPOESS satellites were to host proven technologies and operational versions of sensors that were under operational-prototyping by NASA, at that time. The estimated launch date for the first NPOESS satellite, "C1" or "Charlie 1" was around 2013. Issues with sensor developments were the primary cited reason for delays and cost-overruns.

NPOESS was a tri-agency program led by an Integrated Program Office (IPO) containing staff from the US Department of Defense, National Oceanic and Atmospheric Administration, and NASA. NPOESS was to be operated by the NOAA/National Environmental Satellite, Data, and Information Service (NESDIS) / NPOESS Program Executive Office Flight Operations at the NOAA Satellite Operations Facility (NSOF) in Suitland, MD. TRW, later Northrop Grumman Aerospace Systems (NGAS) after TRW was acquired by Northrop Grumman, was the primary system integrator for the NPOESS project. Raytheon, Ball Aerospace & Technologies Corp. and Boeing were developing the sensors.

The NPOESS satellites were intended to be a replacement for both the United States Department of Defense's Defense Meteorological Satellite Program (DMSP) and the NOAA Polar Operational Environmental Satellites (POES) series. The NPOESS Preparatory Project (NPP) was planned as a pathfinder mission for NPOESS. The project had to go through three Nunn-McCurdy reviews, Congressional hearings that are automatically triggered when a program goes over budget by more than 25%. Suomi NPP was launched five years behind schedule, on October 28, 2011.

The White House announced on February 1, 2010, that the NPOESS satellite partnership was to be dissolved, and that two separate lines of polar-orbiting satellites to serve military and civilian users would be pursued instead:

- The NOAA/NASA portion is called the Joint Polar Satellite System (JPSS). The first satellite in the program – originally called JPSS-1, but now known as NOAA-20 – was constructed by Ball Aerospace & Technologies Corp., under a fixed price contract of $248 million with a performance period through Feb. 1, 2015. The common ground system was constructed by Raytheon. NOAA-20 launched on November 18, 2017.
- The Defense Department's portion was called the Defense Weather Satellite System (DWSS). In January 2012, the US Air Force cancelled the program.
