= List of weather instruments =

This is a list of devices used for recording and give output readings of various aspects of the weather.

== Typical instruments ==
Weather stations typically have these following instruments:

- Thermometer for measuring air and sea surface temperature
- Barometer for measuring atmospheric pressure
- Hygrometer for measuring humidity
- Anemometer for measuring wind speed
- Pyranometer for measuring solar radiation
- Rain gauge for measuring liquid precipitation over a set period of time
- Wind sock for measuring general wind speed and wind direction
- Wind vane (also called a weather vane or a weathercock) for showing the wind direction
- Present Weather/Precipitation Identification Sensor for identifying falling precipitation
- Disdrometer for measuring drop size distribution
- Transmissometer for measuring visibility
- Ceilometer for measuring cloud ceiling

== Observation systems ==
- Argo
- Global Atmosphere Watch
- Automatic weather station
- Remote Automated Weather Stations (RAWS)
- Automated Surface Observing System (ASOS)
- NEXRAD radar
- Global Sea Level Observing System
- SST buoys
- Hurricane Hunters
- Dropsonde
- SNOTEL
- Weather balloon
- Weather vane
- Windsock
- Thermometer
- Anemometer
- Hygrometer
- Automated Meteorological Data Acquisition System

=== Obsolete observation systems ===
- WSR-57
- WSR-74

== Orbital instrumentation ==
- AIRS
- AMSU-A
- ASTER
- Aqua
- Aura
- AVHRR
- CALIPSO
- CloudSat
- CERES
- DMC
- Envisat
- EROS
- GOES
- GOMOS
- GRACE
- Hydros
- ICESat
- IKONOS
- Jason-1
- Landsat
- MERIS
- MetOp
- Meteor
- Meteosat
- MLS
- MIPAS
- MISR
- MODIS
- MOPITT
- MTSAT
- NMP
- NOAA-N'
- NPOESS
- OMI
- OCO
- PARASOL
- QuickBird
- QuikSCAT
- RADARSAT-1
- SCIAMACHY
- SeaWiFS
- SORCE
- SPOT
- TES
- Terra
- TRMM

=== Obsolete orbital instrumentation ===
- ERS
- Nimbus program
- Project Vanguard
- Seasat
- TOPEX/Poseidon
- TIROS

== See also ==
- Automated Quality control of meteorological observations
- Convective storm detection
- Earth Observing System
- Environmental monitoring
- Geographic information system (GIS)
- Glossary of meteorology
- Mesonet
- Meteorology
- Radiosonde
- Rocketsonde
- Surface weather observation
- Timex Expedition WS4
- Tropical cyclone observation
- Weather reconnaissance
- Weather radar
- Weather satellite
