= Generic Earth Observation Metadata Standard =

GEOMS – Generic Earth Observation Metadata Standard is a metadata standard used for archiving data from groundbased networks, like the Network for the Detection of Atmospheric Composition Change (NDACC), and for using this kind of data for the validation of NASA and ESA satellite data.

== Introduction ==
The Generic Earth Observation Metadata Standard (GEOMS) outlines the metadata and data structure requirements developed to facilitate the use of geophysical datasets by improving their portability and accessibility, and by making their contents self-describing. This approach was originally selected to deal with atmospheric and oceanographic datasets, but has been recently expanded to support all measurements from Earth observation instruments. The definitions have been carefully chosen to allow applicability to other scientific endeavors. GEOMS metadata and data structure requirements may be applied to any project where data are to be exchanged.

== Motivation ==
For geophysical validation, independent observations are performed by a large number of in-situ, remote sensing, and satellite instruments for comparison with satellite based geophysical data products. To enhance the usability of the diverse correlative datasets collected for the EOS-Aura validation program and the Envisat calibration and validation campaign (Cal/Val), metadata definitions, covering a broad range of instrument types and geophysical parameters, have been established. In support of these efforts, relational databases have been designed to store the metadata and to allow extensive quality assurance (QA) and quality control (QC) of the submitted files, while enabling easy data mining and retrieval of selected datasets. This development was initiated in 1998 through the European Commission (EC) project COSE, Compilation of Atmospheric Observations in Support of Satellite Measurements over Europe, and extended in collaboration with ESA, NASA, principal investigators (PI) of the Envisat and Aura validation campaign, and selected PIs from NDACC, for the implementation of a uniform data exchange standard.

== Application ==
The current GEOMS guidelines describe the standard metadata definitions adopted for the correlative, experimental and model data archived for the EOS-Aura validation program, the Envisat calibration and validation efforts, data from NDACC, and the GECA project, which supports existing and future ESA calibration and validation programs.

The first application for earlier versions of GEOMS was the definition of metadata requirements for the calibration and validation activities of the Advanced Along Track Scanning Radiometer (AATSR), the Global Ozone Monitoring by Occultation of Stars (GOMOS), the MEdium Resolution Imaging Spectrometer (MERIS), the Michelson Interferometer for Passive Atmospheric Sounding (MIPAS) and the SCanning Imaging Absorption SpectroMeter for Atmospheric CHartographY (SCIAMACHY) sensors flying on the European Space Agency (ESA) Envisat platform. These metadata requirements are as well applied to the validation program of the National Aeronautics and Space Administration (NASA) Earth Observing System (EOS) Aura mission carrying the High Resolution Dynamic Limb Sounder (HIRDLS), the Microwave Limb Sounder (MLS), the Ozone Monitoring Experiment (OMI) and the Tropospheric Emission Spectrometer (TES) atmospheric instruments. The scope of GEOMS has been broadened to NASA A-train satellite instruments, to data from the Network for the Detection of Atmospheric Composition Change (NDACC) and additional ESA Earth observation missions. The latter are supported by the Generic Environment for Calibration/Validation Analysis (GECA) project.

== Supported Instruments ==
As of summer 2011 the GEOMS format has been completely defined via templates for the following instrument data:

- OMI - Ozone monitoring instrument (selected datasets)
- LIDAR - Light Detection And Ranging
- MWR - Microwave radiometer
- FTIR - Fourier Transform Infrared Spectroscopy
- Radio occultation (RO) (selected datasets)
- UVVIS.DOAS - UV/Vis Differential Optical Absorption Spectroscopy
- Sondes (selected datasets)
- Buoys (selected datasets)

== Implementation ==
In recent years, the Hierarchical Data Format has become the de facto satellite data exchange format for the ESA and the NASA Earth observation missions. HDF was originally developed by the National Center for Supercomputing Applications (NCSA) and is currently supported by the non-profit HDF Group. Next to HDF, another hierarchical data format, netCDF, is extensively used in Earth observation. The netCDF format is maintained by Unidata. To facilitate the validation of space borne measurements by correlative data from heterogeneous sources, the use of a common file format becomes a necessity. The metadata guidelines defined in this document are implemented using the HDF4, HDF5 or netCDF file formats, but are not limited to these formats. Special care must be given to the submission of files to GEOMS supporting data centers. Some data centers may not have native support to all discussed data formats.

== Members ==
Currently, the GEOMS group consists of representatives of NASA, ESA, the NDACC and related universities and organizations. The GEOMS group invites interested persons to subscribe to the GEOMS email list.
