= Atmospheric chemistry observational databases =

Aspect of atmospheric sciences

Over the last two centuries many environmental chemical observations have been made from a variety of ground-based, airborne, and orbital platforms and deposited in databases. Many of these databases are publicly available. All of the instruments mentioned in this article give online public access to their data. These observations are critical in developing our understanding of the Earth's atmosphere and issues such as climate change, ozone depletion and air quality. Some of the external links provide repositories of many of these datasets in one place. For example, the Cambridge Atmospheric Chemical Database, is a large database in a uniform ASCII format. Each observation is augmented with the meteorological conditions such as the temperature, potential temperature, geopotential height, and equivalent PV latitude.

== Ground-based and balloon observations ==
- NDSC observations. The Network for the Detection for Stratospheric Change (NDSC) is a set of high-quality remote-sounding research stations for observing and understanding the physical and chemical state of the stratosphere. Ozone and key ozone-related chemical compounds and parameters are targeted for measurement. The NDSC is a major component of the international upper atmosphere research effort and has been endorsed by national and international scientific agencies, including the International Ozone Commission, the United Nations Environment Programme (UNEP), and the World Meteorological Organization (WMO). The primary instruments and measurements are: Ozone lidar (vertical profiles of ozone from the tropopause to at least 40 km altitude; in some cases tropospheric ozone will also be measured). Temperature lidar (vertical profiles of temperature from about 30 to 80 km). Aerosol lidar (vertical profiles of aerosol optical depth in the lower stratosphere). Water vapor lidar (vertical profiles of water vapor in the lower stratosphere). Ozone microwave (vertical profiles of stratospheric ozone from 20 to 70 km). H_{2}O microwave (vertical profiles water vapor from about 20 to 80 km). ClO microwave (vertical profiles of ClO from about 25 to 45 km, depending on latitude). Ultraviolet/Visible spectrograph (column abundance of ozone, NO_{2}, and, at some latitudes, OClO and BrO). Fourier Transform Infrared spectrometer (column abundances of a broad range of species including ozone, HCl, NO, NO_{2}, ClONO_{2}, and HNO_{3}).
- MkIV observations. The MkIV Interferometer is a Fourier Transform Infra-Red (FTIR) Spectrometer, designed and built at the Jet Propulsion Laboratory in 1984, to remotely sense the composition of the Earth's atmosphere by the technique of solar absorption spectrometry. This was born out of concern that man-made pollutants (e.g. chlorofluorocarbons, aircraft exhaust) might perturb the ozone layer. Since 1984, the MkIV Interferometer has participated in 3 NASA DC-8 polar aircraft campaigns, and has successfully completed 15 balloon flights. In addition, the MkIV Interferometer made over 900 days of ground-based observations from many different locations, including McMurdo, Antarctica in 1986.
- Sonde observations. The World Ozone and Ultraviolet Radiation Data Centre (WOUDC) is one of five World Data Centres which are part of the Global Atmosphere Watch (GAW) programme of the World Meteorological Organization (WMO). The WOUDC is operated by the Experimental Studies Division of the Meteorological Service of Canada (MSC) — formerly Atmospheric Environment Service (AES), Environment Canada and is located in Toronto. The WOUDC began as the World Ozone Data Centre (WODC) in 1960 and produced its first data publication of Ozone Data for the World in 1964. In June 1992, the AES agreed to a request from the WMO to add ultraviolet radiation data to the WODC. The Data Centre has since been renamed to the World Ozone and Ultraviolet Radiation Data Centre (WOUDC) with the two component parts: the WODC and the World Ultraviolet Radiation Data Centre (WUDC).

== Airborne observations ==
- Aircraft observations. Many aircraft campaigns have been conducted as part of the Suborbital Science Program and by the Earth Science Project Office an overview of these campaigns is available. The data can be accessed from the Earth Science Project Office archives.
- MOZAIC observations. The MOZAIC program (Measurement of OZone and water vapour by AIrbus in-service airCraft) was initiated in 1993 by European scientists, aircraft manufacturers and airlines to collect experimental data. Its goal is to help understand the atmosphere and how it is changing under the influence of human activity, with particular interest in the effects of aircraft. MOZAIC consists of automatic and regular measurements of ozone and water vapour by five long range passenger airliners flying all over the world. The aim is to build a large database of measurements to allow studies of chemical and physical processes in the atmosphere, and hence to validate global chemistry transport models. MOZAIC data provide, in particular, detailed ozone and water vapour climatologies at 9–12 km where subsonic aircraft emit most of their exhaust and which is a very critical domain (e.g. radiatively and S/T exchanges) still imperfectly described in existing models. This will be valuable to improve knowledge about the processes occurring in the upper troposphere/ lower stratosphere (UT/LS), and the model treatment of near tropopause chemistry and transport. The MOZAIC data is restricted access, to obtain access the forms need to be filled out.
- CARIBIC observations. The CARIBIC (Civil Aircraft for the Regular Investigation of the atmosphere Based on an Instrument Container) project is an innovative scientific project to study and monitor important chemical and physical processes in the Earth's atmosphere. Detailed and extensive measurements are made during long distance flights on board the Airbus A340-600 "Leverkusen" (http://www.flightradar24.com/data/airplanes/D-AIHE/). We deploy an airfreight container with automated scientific apparatuses, which are connected to an air and particle (aerosol) inlet underneath the aircraft. In contrast to MOZAIC, CARIBIC is only installed on one aircraft, but it measures a much wider spectrum of atmospheric constituents (CARIBIC -> instrumentation). Both, CARIBIC and MOZAIC are integrated in IAGOS. Data exist from 1998-2002 and from 2004-today. It can be requested via CARIBIC -> data access.

== Space shuttle observations ==
- ATMOS observations. The Atmospheric Trace Molecule Spectroscopy experiment (ATMOS) is an infrared spectrometer (a Fourier transform interferometer) that is designed to study the chemical composition of the atmosphere. In this section you will be able to read both general and detailed information as to why and how the instrument works. The ATMOS instrument has flown four times on the Space Shuttle since 1985. The predecessor to ATMOS, flown on aircraft and high-altitude balloon platforms, was born in the early 1970s out of concern for the effects of Super Sonic Transport exhaust products on the ozone layer. The experiment was redesigned for the Space Shuttle when the potential for ozone destruction by man-made chlorofluorocarbons was discovered and the need for global measurements became crucial.
- CRISTA observations. CRISTA is short for CRyogenic Infrared Spectrometers and Telescopes for the Atmosphere. It is a limb-scanning satellite experiment, designed and developed by the University of Wuppertal to measure infrared emissions of the Earth's atmosphere. Equipped with three telescopes and four spectrometers and cooled with liquid helium, CRISTA acquires global maps of temperature and atmospheric trace gases with very high horizontal and vertical resolution. The design enables the observation of small scale dynamical structures in the 15–150 km altitude region.

== Satellite observations ==
- ACE observations. The Atmospheric Chemistry Experiment (ACE) satellite, also known as SCISAT-1, is a Canadian satellite that makes measurements of the Earth's atmosphere and follows in heritage of ATMOS.
- Aura observations. Aura flies in formation with the NASA EOS "A Train," a collection of several other satellites (Aqua, CALIPSO, CloudSat and the French PARASOL). Aura carries four instruments for studies of atmospheric chemistry: MLS, HIRDLS, TES and OMI.
- ILAS observations. ILAS (Improved Limb Atmospheric Spectrometer) developed by MOE (the Ministry of the Environment) (formerly EA - Environment Agency of Japan) is boarded on ADEOS (Advanced Earth Observing Satellite). On August 17, 1996, ADEOS was launched by the H-II rocket from the Tanegashima Space Center of Japan (ADEOS was renamed as "MIDORI") and stopped its operation on June 30, 1997. Data obtained by ILAS are processed, archived, and distributed by NIES (National Institute for Environmental Studies).
- POAM observations. The Polar Ozone and Aerosol Measurement II (POAM II) instrument was developed by the Naval Research Laboratory (NRL) to measure the vertical distribution of atmospheric ozone, water vapor, nitrogen dioxide, aerosol extinction, and temperature. POAM II measures solar extinction in nine narrow band channels, covering the spectral range from approximately 350 to 1060 nm.
- Sulfate aerosol observations from SAGE and HALOE. The SAGE II (Stratospheric Aerosol and Gas Experiment II) sensor was launched into a 57 degree inclination orbit aboard the Earth Radiation Budget Satellite (ERBS) in October 1984. During each sunrise and sunset encountered by the orbiting spacecraft, the instrument uses the solar occultation technique to measure attenuated solar radiation through the Earth's limb in seven channels centered at wavelengths ranging from 0.385 to 1.02 micrometers. The retrieval of stratospheric aerosol size distributions based on HALOE multi-wavelength particle extinction measurements was described by Hervig et al. [1998]. That approach yields unimodal lognormal size distributions, which describe the aerosol concentration versus radius using three parameters: total aerosol concentration, median radius, and distribution width. This site offers results based on the Hervig et al. [1998] technique, with one exception. The retrieval results reported here are based on sulfate refractive indices for 215 K, where Hervig et al. [1998] used room temperature indices adjusted to stratospheric temperatures using the Lorentz-Lorenz rule. Size distributions were only retrieved at altitudes above tropospheric cloud tops. Clouds were identified using techniques described by Hervig and McHugh [1999]. The HALOE size distributions are offered in NetCDF files containing data for a single year. The results are reported on a uniform altitude grid ranging from 6 to 33 km at 0.3 km spacing. The native HALOE altitude spacing is 0.3 km, so this interpolation has little or no effect on the data. The files report profile data including: altitude, pressure, temperature, aerosol concentration, median radius, distribution width, aerosol composition. Aerosol surface area and volume densities can be easily calculated from the size distribution parameters using the relationships given here.
- Upper Atmosphere Research Satellite (UARS) observations. Data from the UARS is available from the GES Distributed Active Archive Center (DAAC). The UARS satellite was launched in 1991 by the Space Shuttle Discovery. It is 35 feet (11 m) long, 15 feet (4.6 m) in diameter, weighs 13,000 pounds, and carries 10 instruments. UARS orbits at an altitude of 375 miles (604 km) with an orbital inclination of 57 degrees. UARS measured ozone and chemical compounds found in the ozone layer which affect ozone chemistry and processes. UARS also measured winds and temperatures in the stratosphere as well as the energy input from the Sun. Together, these helped define the role of the upper atmosphere in climate and climate variability.

== Related observations ==
- Surface albedo. The surface reflectivity is of importance for atmospheric photolysis. Instruments such as the Total Ozone Mapping Spectrometer (TOMS) and the Ozone Monitoring Instrument (OMI) provide daily global fields.

== See also ==
- Acid rain
- Atmospheric chemistry
- Greenhouse gas
- International Global Atmospheric Chemistry
- Ozone
- Pollution
- Scientific Assessment of Ozone Depletion
