= MOPITT =

Canadian scientific instrument aboard NASA's Terra satellite

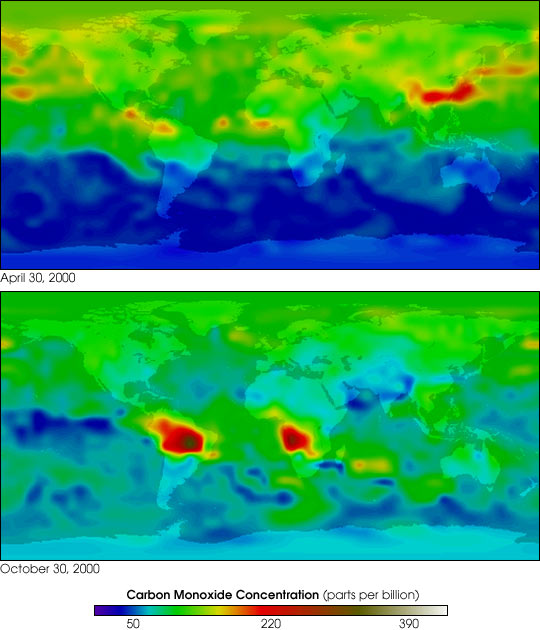
MOPITT 2000 global carbon monoxide.

MOPITT (Measurements of Pollution in the Troposphere) is an ongoing astronomical instrument aboard NASA's Terra satellite that measures global tropospheric carbon monoxide levels. It is part of NASA's Earth Observing System (EOS), and combined with the other payload remote sensors on the Terra satellite, the spacecraft monitors the Earth's environment and climate changes. Following its construction in Canada, MOPITT was launched into Earth's orbit in 1999 and utilizes gas correlation spectroscopy to measure the presence of different gases in the troposphere. The fundamental operations occur in its optical system composed of two optical tables holding the bulk of the apparatus. Results from the MOPITT enable scientists to better understand carbon monoxide's effects on a global scale, and various studies have been conducted based on MOPITT's measurements.

== Background ==
The National Research Council Canada founded the MOPITT project following its initial proposal in 1989. After the establishment of the Canadian Space Agency (CSA), MOPITT shifted into the agency where it received financial support from the Space Science Division of CSA. It was successfully launched from the Vandenberg Air Force Base on December 18, 1999, and began scientific measurements in March 2000. Before its execution, the only existing global carbon monoxide dataset was measured by the MAPS instrument aboard space shuttles. MOPITT is the first tool to measure global concentrations and variations in carbon monoxide. It is part of a series of five payloads on the Terra satellite that oversees global environmental changes:

- ASTER (Advanced Spaceborne Thermal Emission and Reflection Radiometer)
- CERES (Clouds and the Earth's Radiant Energy System)
- MISR (Multi-angle Imaging Spectroradiometer)
- MODIS (Moderate Resolution Imaging Spectroradiometer)
- MOPITT (Measurements of Pollution in the Troposphere)

Despite the initial five-year term plan, the satellite has continued to operate for over 20 years, and researchers expected all five of these instruments to maintain their functionality and transmit information and data past 2026.

On April 9, 2025 MOPITT was finally switched off in order to conserve power on the ailing spacecraft.

== Technology ==
=== Instrument Methodology ===
MOPITT is a nadir-sounding (vertically downward pointing) instrument that measures upwelling infrared radiation and utilizes correlation spectroscopy (comparison of wavelengths or absorption between a known and unknown sample) to measure concentrations of carbon monoxide. Essentially, MOPITT takes carbon monoxide as an optical filter to measure the signal of the same gas in the troposphere. The sensor quantifies radiance emitted and reflected from Earth through three spectral bands:

- 4.7 μm channels are referred to as the carbon monoxide thermal channels because the signals stem from the thermal emissions from Earth's surface and the atmosphere
- The 2.3 μm channels are termed the carbon monoxide solar channel because they absorb the dominant signal from reflected sunlight
- 2.2 μm channels refer to the methane solar channels because reflected sunlight is the major signal, similar to the 2.3 μm channels

These channels absorb different amounts of energy, leading to differences in the resulting signals that correlate to the spectral sample of carbon monoxide. To further analyze carbon monoxide levels, MOPITT adjusts the path length or gaseous pressure of the gas sample, causing the frequency of these spectral lines to vary, which will give a difference and an average transmission. The difference specifies the gases measured, whereas the average signal indicates the overall radiation minus the initial gas measured.

MOPITT's spatial resolution is 22 km horizontally and about 5 km vertically and scans Earth at a broad area of 640 km wide. The carbon monoxide measurement profiles are created through the upwelling of thermal radiance in 4.6-μm absorption. MOPITT can view different layers of the troposphere by varying modulated cells: Pressure-modulated cells (PMCs) are used to observe upper layers while length-modulated cells (LMCs) can view lower layers of the troposphere.

=== Instrument Description ===
At the heart of MOPITT lies the optical system, which is composed of two identical "mirror imaged" optical tables that include the calibration sources, scan mirrors, choppers, LMCs, PMCs, modulators, and dewar cooler assemblies containing cold optics and thermal and solar detectors. A pair of low-vibration Stirling Cycle coolers chill the dewar. Considerable heat-emitting units like the cooler are placed intentionally on the coldplate, and other critical electronic pieces are placed near it as well. The coldplate, located under MOPITT's baseplate, provides a stable thermal environment for the instrument. It utilizes capillary action with ammonia as its working fluid.

In the two optical systems referred to above, eight channels measure carbon monoxide or methane. Channels one, two, three, five, six, and seven focus on carbon monoxide. The six channels for carbon monoxide vary in cell pressures from 25 to 800 mb, and their cell lengths range from 2 to 10 mm. Their center wavelength also differs between channels, and the modulator types are either LMCs or PMCs. In contrast, channels four and eight measure methane, and their only difference is the different LMCs used. All channels operate at 300 K.

== Applications ==
Before MOPITT's release, data on carbon monoxide was limited. With MOPITT's comprehensive measurements of carbon monoxide throughout the past two decades, scientists are better equipped to predict the potential consequences of carbon monoxide pollution. Its applications include:

- A better understanding of the increase in ozone concentration in the troposphere allows scientists to perform interim pollution methods
- Assessment of antipollution practices such as automobile emission reduction standards
- Analysis of environmental pollution influenced by human activities
- Generating maps of pollution transport, such as the direction of carbon monoxide emissions after large fires
- Confirmation of newly developed climate models that portray areas producing or reducing carbon monoxide

=== Studies ===
Many studies utilizing MOPITT's data have been completed. Notable ones include:

- The analysis of the variation in vertical structure of carbon monoxide caused by Asian summer monsoons
- The examination of seasonal carbon monoxide climatology in the Northern Hemisphere
- The observation of large horizontal gradients in carbon monoxide at the synoptic scale
- The study of carbon monoxide variability in the Southern Hemisphere
- Observation of enhanced carbon monoxide over the Zagros Mountains in Iran
- Detection and analysis of carbon monoxide emitted by cities and urban areas to demonstrate rising carbon monoxide pollution
- Breakdown of carbon monoxide trends in varying regions

In the year 2022 alone, more than 250 studies have used measurements from MOPITT.
