= High-resolution dynamics limb sounder =

The high-resolution dynamics limb sounder (HIRDLS) is an instrument on board the NASA Aura. It follows in the heritage of LRIR (Nimbus-6), LIMS and SAMS (Nimbus-7), ISAMS and CLAES (UARS). It was designed to observe global distribution of temperature and concentrations of O_{3}, H_{2}O, CH_{4}, N_{2}O, NO_{2}, HNO_{3}, N_{2}O_{5}, CFC-11, CFC-12, ClONO_{2}, and aerosols in the upper troposphere, stratosphere, and mesosphere.

After launch, activation of the HIRDLS instrument revealed that the optical path was blocked so that only 20% of the aperture could view the Earth's atmosphere. Engineering studies suggest that a piece of thermal blanketing material ruptured from the back of the instrument during the explosive decompression of launch. Attempts to remove this material mirror failed. However, even with the 80% blockage, measurements at high vertical resolution can be made at one scan angle. HIRDLS failed in March 2008.

== See also ==
- Atmospheric chemistry observational databases
- International Global Atmospheric Chemistry
- Microwave limb sounder
