= GEIA =

GEIA or Geia may refer to:

- Ge'a, a moshav in Israel
- Global Emissions InitiAtive
- Government Electronics and Information Technology Association

== People ==
- Jeremy Geia (born 1974), Yidindji man, former journalist and Australian Aboriginal activist
- Joe Geia (born 1959), Aboriginal Australian musician
- Obe Geia (born 1989), Australian professional rugby league footballer
