= Tropical Rainfall Measuring Mission =

Joint space mission between NASA and JAXA

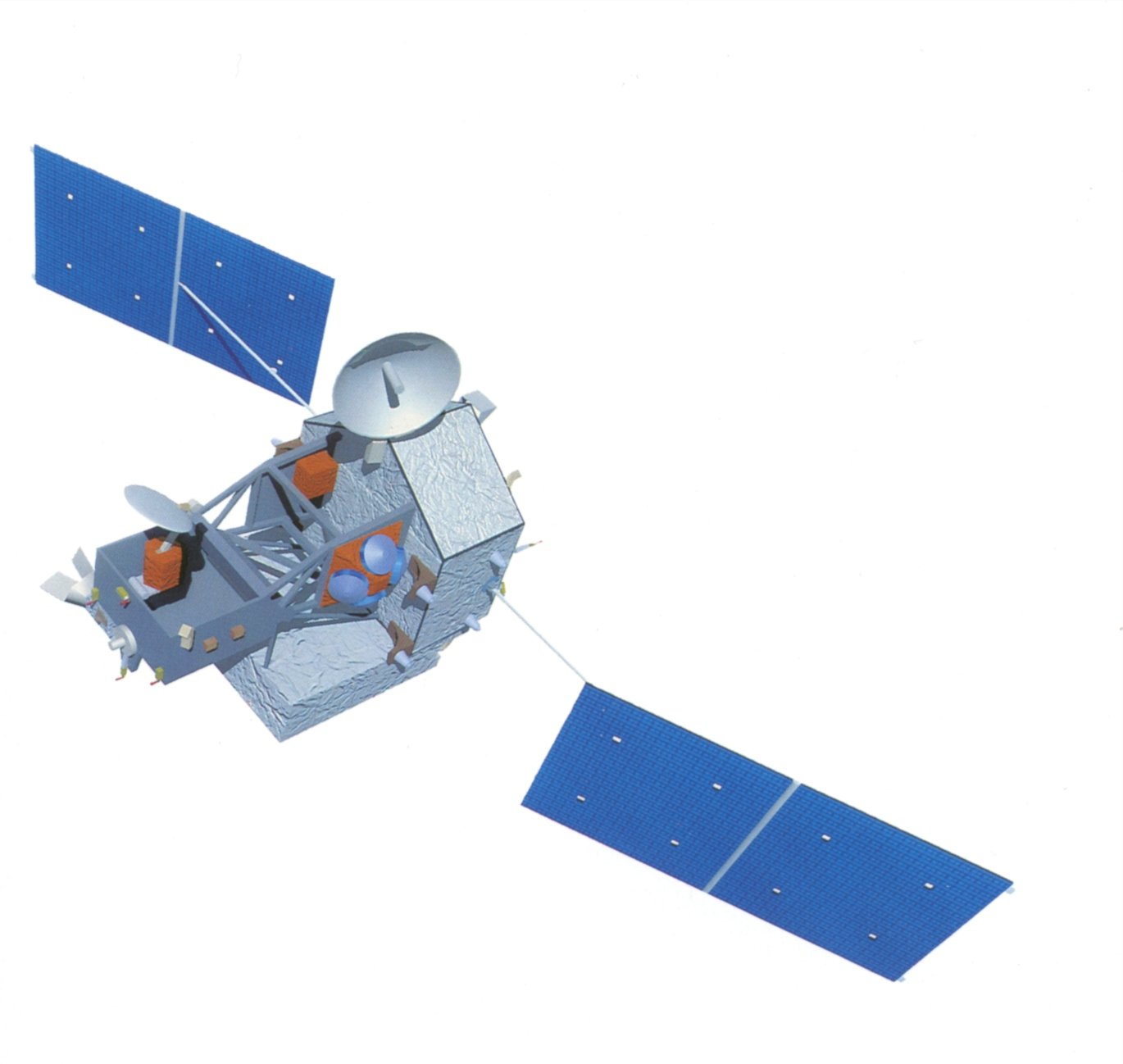
- Artist conception of the TRMM satellite
- Mission type: Environmental research
- Operator: NASA
- COSPAR ID: 1997-074A
- SATCAT no.: 25063
- Mission duration: 18 years

Spacecraft properties
- Launch mass: 3524 kg
- Dry mass: 2634 kg
- Power: 1100 watts

Start of mission
- Launch date: 27 November 1997, 21:27 UTC
- Rocket: H-II
- Launch site: Tanegashima, LA-Y1
- Contractor: Mitsubishi Heavy Industries

End of mission
- Disposal: Deorbited
- Deactivated: 15 April 2015
- Decay date: 16 June 2015, 06:54 UTC

Orbital parameters
- Reference system: Geocentric orbit
- Regime: Low Earth orbit
- Perigee altitude: 366 km (227 mi)
- Apogee altitude: 381 km (237 mi)
- Inclination: 35.0°
- Period: 92.0 minutes
- Programme NASA Earth Probe

The Tropical Rainfall Measuring Mission (TRMM) was a joint space mission between NASA and JAXA designed to monitor and study tropical rainfall. The term refers to both the mission itself and the satellite that the mission used to collect data. TRMM was part of NASA's Mission to Planet Earth, a long-term, coordinated research effort to study the Earth as a global system. The satellite was launched on 27 November 1997 from the Tanegashima Space Center in Tanegashima, Japan. TRMM operated for 17 years, including several mission extensions, before being decommissioned on 15 April 2015. TRMM re-entered Earth's atmosphere on 16 June 2015.

== Background ==
Tropical precipitation is a difficult parameter to measure, due to large spatial and temporal variations. However, understanding tropical precipitation is important for weather and climate prediction, as this precipitation contains three-fourths of the energy that drives atmospheric wind circulation. Prior to TRMM, the distribution of rainfall worldwide was known to only a 50% of certainty.

The concept for TRMM was first proposed in 1984. The science objectives, as first proposed, were:

- To advance understanding of the global energy and water cycles by providing distributions of rainfall and latent heating over the global Tropics.
- To understand the mechanisms through which changes in tropical rainfall influence global circulation and to improve ability to model these processes in order to predict global circulations and rainfall variability at monthly and longer timescales.
- To provide rain and latent heating distributions to improve the initialization of models ranging from 24-hour forecasts to short-range climate variations.
- To help to understand, to diagnose, and to predict the onset and development of the El Niño, El Niño–Southern Oscillation, and the propagation of the 30- to 60-day oscillations in the Tropics.
- To help to understand the effect that rainfall has on the ocean thermohaline circulations and the structure of the upper ocean.
- To allow cross calibration between TRMM and other sensors with life expectancies beyond that of TRMM itself.
- To evaluate the diurnal variability of tropical rainfall globally.
- To evaluate a space-based system for rainfall measurements.

Japan joined the initial study for the TRMM mission in 1986. Development of the satellite became a joint project between the space agencies of the United States and Japan, with Japan providing the Precipitation Radar (PR) and H-II launch vehicle, and the United States providing the satellite bus and remaining instruments. The project received formal support from the United States Congress in 1991, followed by spacecraft construction from 1993 through 1997. TRMM launched from Tanegashima Space Center on 27 November 1997.

== Spacecraft ==
The Tropical Rainfall Measuring Mission (TRMM), one of the spacecraft in the NASA Earth Probe series of research satellites, is a highly focused, limited-objective program aimed at measuring monthly and seasonal rainfall over the global tropics and subtropics. TRMM is a joint project between the United States and Japan to measure rainfall between 35.0° North and 35.0° South at 350 km altitude.

== Mission extensions and de-orbit ==
To extend TRMM's mission life beyond its primary mission, NASA boosted the spacecraft's orbit altitude to 402.5 km in 2001.

In 2005, NASA director Michael Griffin decided to extend the mission again by using the propellant originally intended for a controlled descent. This came after a 2002 NASA risk review put the probability of a human injury or death caused by TRMM's uncontrolled re-entry at 1-in-5,000, about twice the casualty risk deemed acceptable for re-entering NASA satellites; and a subsequent recommendation from the National Research Council panel that the mission be extended despite the risk of an uncontrolled entry.

Battery issues began to limit the spacecraft in 2014 and the mission operations team had to make decisions about how to ration power. In March 2014, the VIRS instruments was turned off to extend the battery life.

In July 2014, with propellant on TRMM running low, NASA decided to cease station-keeping maneuvers and allow the spacecraft's orbit to slowly decay, while continuing to collect data. The remaining fuel, initially reserved to avoid collisions with other satellites or space debris, was depleted in early March 2015. Re-entry was originally expected sometime between May 2016 and November 2017, but occurred sooner due to heightened solar activity. The probe's primary sensor, the precipitation radar, was switched off for the final time on 1 April 2015 and the final scientific sensor, LIS, was turned off on 15 April 2015. Re-entry occurred on 16 June 2015 at 06:54 UTC.

== Instruments aboard the TRMM ==
=== Precipitation Radar ===
The Precipitation Radar (PR) was the first space-borne instrument designed to provide three-dimensional maps of storm structure. The measurements yielded information on the intensity and distribution of the rain, on the rain type, on the storm depth and on the height at which the snow melts into rain. The estimates of the heat released into the atmosphere at different heights based on these measurements can be used to improve models of the global atmospheric circulation. The PR operated at 13.8 GHz and measured the 3-D rainfall distribution over land and ocean surfaces. It defined a layer depth of perception and hence measured rainfall that actually reached the latent heat of atmosphere. It had a 4.3 km resolution at radii with 220 km swath.

=== TRMM Microwave Imager ===
The TRMM Microwave Imager (TMI) was a passive microwave sensor designed to provide quantitative rainfall information over a wide swath under the TRMM satellite. By carefully measuring the minute amounts of microwave energy emitted by the Earth and its atmosphere, TMI was able to quantify the water vapor, the cloud water, and the rainfall intensity in the atmosphere. It was a relatively small instrument that consumed little power. This, combined with the wide swath and the quantitative information regarding rainfall made TMI the "workhorse" of the rain-measuring package on Tropical Rainfall Measuring Mission. TMI is not a new instrument. It is based on the design of the highly successful Special Sensor Microwave/Imager (SSM/I) which has been flying continuously on Defense Meteorological Satellites since 1987. The TMI measures the intensity of radiation at five separate frequencies: 10.7, 19.4, 21.3, 37.0, 85.5 GHz. These frequencies are similar to those of the SSM/I, except that TMI has the additional 10.7 GHz channel designed to provide a more-linear response for the high rainfall rates common in tropical rainfall. The other main improvement that is expected from TMI is due to the improved ground resolution. This improvement, however, is not the result of any instrument improvements, but rather a function of the lower altitude of TRMM 402 kilometers compared to 860 kilometers of SSM/I). TMI has a 878-kilometer wide swath on the surface. The higher resolution of TMI on TRMM, as well as the additional 10.7 GHz frequency, makes TMI a better instrument than its predecessors. The additional information supplied by the Precipitation Radar further helps to improve algorithms. The improved rainfall products over a wide swath will serve both TRMM as well as the continuing measurements being made by the SSM/I and radiometers flying on the NASA's EOS-PM (Aqua (satellite)) and the Japanese ADEOS II satellites.

=== Visible and Infrared Scanner ===
The Visible and Infrared Scanner (VIRS) was one of the three instruments in the rain-measuring package and serves as a very indirect indicator of rainfall. VIRS, as its name implies, sensed radiation coming up from the Earth in five spectral regions, ranging from visible to infrared, or 0.63 to 12 mm. VIRS was included in the primary instrument package for two reasons. First was its ability to delineate rainfall. The second, and even more important reason, was to serve as a transfer standard to other measurements that are made routinely using Polar Operational Environmental Satellites (POES) and Geostationary Operational Environmental Satellite (GOES) satellites. The intensity of the radiation in the various spectral regions (or bands) can be used to determine the brightness (visible and near infrared) or temperature (infrared) of the source.

=== Clouds and the Earth's Radiant Energy Sensor ===
Clouds and the Earth's Radiant Energy System (CERES) measured the energy at the top of the atmosphere, as well as estimates energy levels within the atmosphere and at the Earth's surface. The CERES instrument was based on the successful Earth Radiation Budget Experiment (ERBS) which used three satellites to provide global energy budget measurements from 1984 to 1993. Using information from very high resolution cloud imaging instruments on the same spacecraft, CERES determines cloud properties, including cloud-amount, altitude, thickness, and the size of the cloud particles. These measurements are important to understanding the Earth's total climate system and improving climate prediction models.

It only operated during January–August 1998, and in March 2000, so the available data record is quite brief (although later CERES instruments were flown on other missions such as the Earth Observing System (EOS) AM (Terra) and PM (Aqua) satellites.)

=== Lightning Imaging Sensor ===
The Lightning Imaging Sensor (LIS) was a small, highly sophisticated instrument that detects and locates lightning over the tropical region of the globe. The lightning detector was a compact combination of optical and electronic elements including a staring imager capable of locating and detecting lightning within individual storms. The imager's field of view allowed the sensor to observe a point on the Earth or a cloud for 80 seconds, a sufficient time to estimate the flashing rate, which told researchers whether a storm was growing or decaying.

== See also ==
- Global Precipitation Measurement (GPM), successor spacecraft launched in February 2014.
