= Global Emissions InitiAtive =

Climatological research group

GEIA logo

Global Emissions InitiAtive (GEIA) is a community effort dedicated to atmospheric emissions information exchange and competence building. GEIA was created in 1990 under the (IGBP) and is a joint IGAC / iLEAPS / AIMES activity. GEIA is governed by an international steering committee and hosts biennial conferences.

== Goals ==
- Access: Make emissions data and information about emissions more readily available
- Analysis: Improve the scientific basis for emissions information and policy making
- Community: Strengthen the science and policy relationships to enhance access to and analysis of emissions

information

== Partnerships ==
- Emissions of atmospheric Compounds & Compilation of Ancillary Data (ECCAD) provides data access to many emissions inventory datasets.
