= Network for the Detection of Atmospheric Composition Change =

The Network for the Detection of Atmospheric Composition Change (NDACC) is composed of more than 70 globally distributed, ground-based, remote-sensing stations with more than 160 instruments making high-quality measurements of atmospheric composition in the stratosphere and upper troposphere for assessing the impact of stratosphere changes on the underlying troposphere and on global climate. It started out as The Network for Detection of Stratospheric Change (NDSC) in 1991 and was renamed to NDACC in 1995. Instrumentation includes lidar, microwave radiometers, Fourier-transform infrared, UV-visible DOAS (differential optical absorption spectroscopy)-type, and Dobson-Brewer spectrometers, as well as spectral UV radiometers.
