= Clouds and the Earth's Radiant Energy System =

NASA satellite climate data instruments

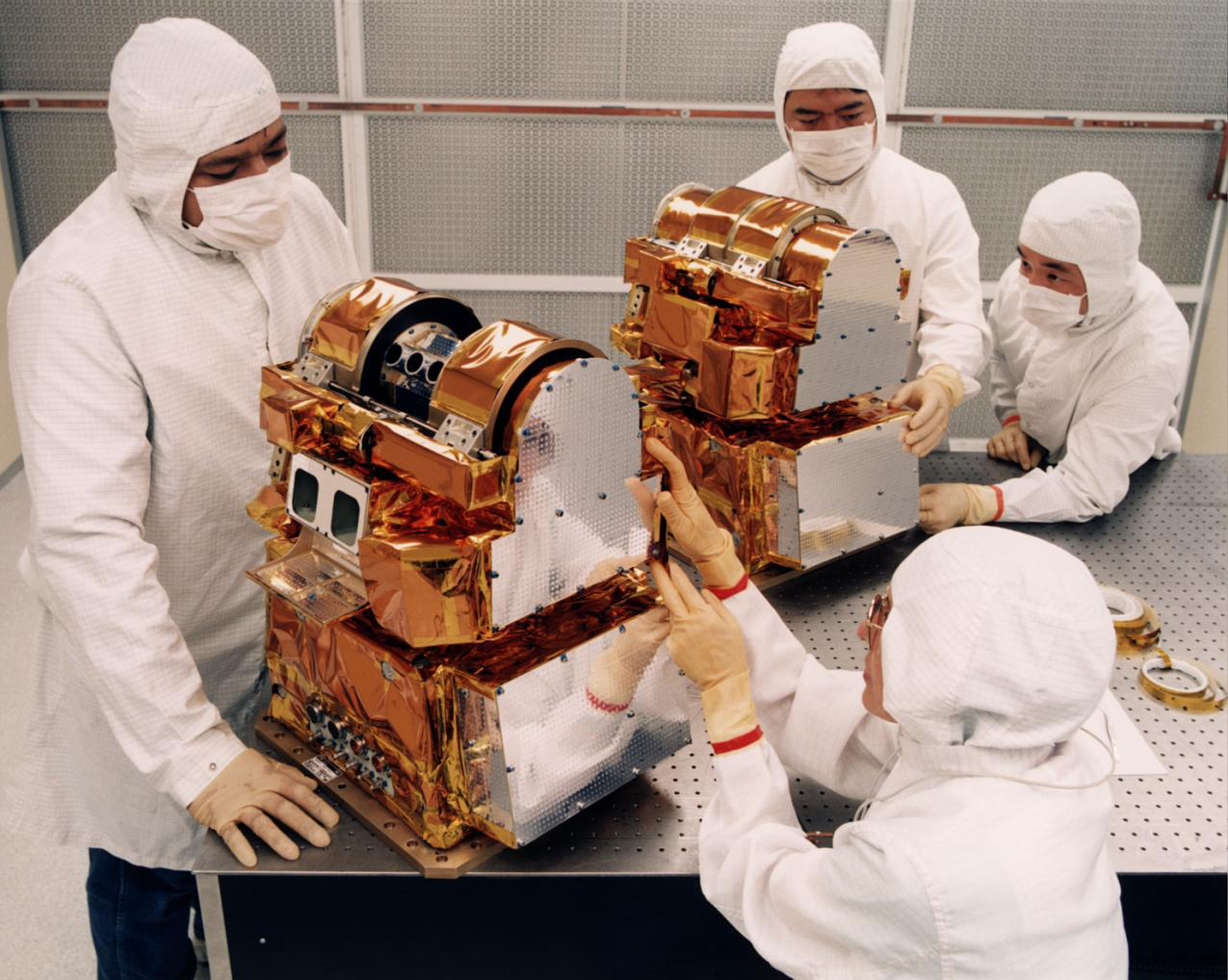
The CERES FM1 and FM2 instruments prior to installation on Terra

Clouds and the Earth's Radiant Energy System (CERES) is an ongoing NASA climatological experiment from Earth orbit. The CERES are scientific satellite instruments, part of NASA's Earth Observing System (EOS), designed to measure solar-reflected and Earth-emitted radiation from the top of the atmosphere (TOA) to the Earth's surface. Cloud properties are determined using simultaneous measurements by other EOS instruments such as the Moderate Resolution Imaging Spectroradiometer (MODIS). Results from the CERES and other NASA missions, such as the Earth Radiation Budget Experiment (ERBE), could enable near-real-time tracking of Earth's energy imbalance (EEI) and better understanding of the role of clouds in global climate change.

Incoming, top-of-atmosphere (TOA) shortwave flux radiation shows energy received from the sun (Jan 26–27, 2012).

Outgoing, longwave flux radiation at the top-of-atmosphere (Jan 26–27, 2012). Heat energy radiated from Earth (in watts per square meter) is shown in shades of yellow, red, blue, and white. The brightest-yellow areas are the hottest and are emitting the most energy out to space, while the dark blue areas and the bright white clouds are much colder, emitting the least energy.

== Scientific goals ==
The CERES experiment has four main objectives:

- Continuation of the ERBE record of radiative fluxes at the top of the atmosphere (TOA) for climate change analysis.
- Doubling the accuracy of estimates of radiative fluxes at TOA and the Earth's surface.
- Provide the first long-term global estimates of the radiative fluxes within the Earth's atmosphere.
- Provide cloud property estimates consistent with the radiative fluxes from surface to TOA.

Each CERES instrument is a radiometer which has three channels – a shortwave (SW) channel to measure reflected sunlight in 0.2–5 μm region, a channel to measure Earth-emitted thermal radiation in the 8–12 μm "window" or "WN" region, and a Total channel to measure entire spectrum of outgoing Earth's radiation (>0.2 μm). The CERES instrument was based on the successful Earth Radiation Budget Experiment, which used three satellites to provide global energy budget measurements from 1984 to 1993.

== Missions ==
=== First launch ===
The first CERES instrument Proto-Flight Module (PFM) was launched aboard the NASA Tropical Rainfall Measuring Mission (TRMM) in November 1997 from Japan. However, this instrument failed to operate after 8 months due to an onboard circuit failure.

=== CERES on the EOS and JPSS mission satellites ===
Six more CERES instruments were launched on the Earth Observing System and the Joint Polar Satellite System. The Terra satellite, launched in December 1999, carried two (Flight Module 1 (FM1) and FM2), and the Aqua satellite, launched in May 2002, carried two more (FM3 and FM4). A fifth instrument (FM5) was launched on the Suomi NPP satellite in October 2011 and a sixth (FM6) on NOAA-20 in November 2017.

=== Decommissioning ===
The mission lifetime of each FM1-FM6 CERES instrument was originally planned for a nominal five years. With the failure of the PFM on TRMM and the 2005 loss of the SW channel of FM4 on Aqua, five of the CERES Flight Modules remained fully operational as of 2017. In 2023 the Aqua and Terra missions were extended into 2026 and 2027 respectively. FM2 was turned off in January 2025 due to degradation of Terra's solar power generation.

== Operating modes ==
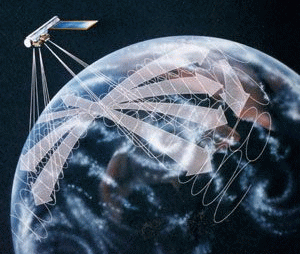
Artist representation of CERES instruments scanning Earth in Rotating Azimuth Plane mode.

CERES operates in three scanning modes: across the satellite ground track (cross-track), along the direction of the satellite ground track (along-track), and in a Rotating Azimuth Plane (RAP). In RAP mode, the radiometers scan in elevation as they rotate in azimuth, thus acquiring radiance measurements from a wide range of viewing angles. Until February 2005, on Terra and Aqua satellites, one of the CERES instruments scanned in cross-track mode while the other was in RAP or along-track mode. The instrument operating in RAP scanning mode took two days of along-track data every month. The multi-angular CERES data is used derive new models which account for the anisotropy of the viewed scene and enable TOA radiative flux retrieval with enhanced precision.

All CERES instruments are in Sun-synchronous orbit. Comparable geostationary data between 60°S and 60°N are also applied within "balanced and filled" data products to provide a diurnally complete representation of the radiation budget and to account for cloud changes between CERES observation times.

== Calibration methods ==
The CERES instruments were designed to provide enhanced measurement stability and precision; however, achieving and ensuring absolute accuracy over time was also known to remain an ongoing challenge. Despite the more advanced capability of CERES to monitor Earth's TOA radiative fluxes globally and with relative accuracy, the only practical way to estimate the absolute magnitude of EEI (as of 2020) is through an inventory of the energy change in the climate system. Consequently, an important constraint within CERES data products has been the anchoring of EEI at one point in time to a value which corresponds to several years of ARGO data.

=== Ground absolute calibration ===
For a climate data record (CDR) mission like CERES, accuracy is highly important and achieved for pure infrared nighttime measurements using a ground laboratory SI traceable blackbody to determine total and WN channel radiometric gains. This, however, was not the case for CERES solar channels such as SW and the solar portion of the Total telescope, which have no direct unbroken chain to SI traceability. This is because CERES solar responses were measured on the ground using lamps whose output energy was estimated by a cryo-cavity reference detector, which used a silver Cassegrain telescope identical to CERES devices to match the satellite instrument's field of view. The reflectivity of this telescope, built and used since the mid-1990s, was never actually measured; it was estimated only based on witness samples (see slide 9 of Priestley et al. (2014)). Such difficulties in ground calibration, combined with suspected on-ground contamination events have resulted in the need to make unexplained ground to flight changes in SW detector gains as big as 8%, to make the ERB data seem somewhat reasonable to climate science (note that CERES currently claims a one sigma SW absolute accuracy of 0.9%).

=== In-flight calibration ===
CERES spatial resolution at nadir view (equivalent footprint diameter) is 10 km for CERES on TRMM, and 20 km for CERES on Terra and Aqua satellites. Perhaps of greater importance for missions such as CERES is calibration stability, or the ability to track and partition instrumental changes from Earth data so it tracks true climate change with confidence. CERES onboard calibration sources intended to achieve this for channels measuring reflected sunlight include solar diffusers and tungsten lamps. However, the lamps have very little output in the important ultraviolet wavelength region where degradation is greatest, and they have been seen to drift in energy by over 1.4% in ground tests, without a capability to monitor them on-orbit (Priestley et al. (2001)). The solar diffusers have also degraded greatly in orbit, that they have been declared unusable by Priestley et al. (2011). A pair of black body cavities that can be controlled at different temperatures are used for the Total and WN channels, but these have not been proved stable to better than 0.5%/decade. Cold space observations and internal calibration are performed during normal Earth scans.

=== Intercalibration ===
Data is compared between CERES instruments on different mission satellites, as well as compared to scan reference data from accompanying spectroradiometers (e.g., MODIS on Aqua). The planned CLARREO Pathfinder mission aims to provide a state-of-the-art reference standard for several existing EOS instruments, including CERES.

A study of annual changes to Earth's energy imbalance (EEI) spanning 2005-2019 showed good agreement between the CERES observation and EEI inferred from in-situ measurements of ocean heat uptake by the Argo float network. A concurrent pair of studies measuring global ocean heat uptake, ice melting, and sea level rise with a combination of space altimetry and gravimetry suggested similar agreements.

== Scientific findings ==
Growth trend in Earth's energy imbalance per CERES annual average values

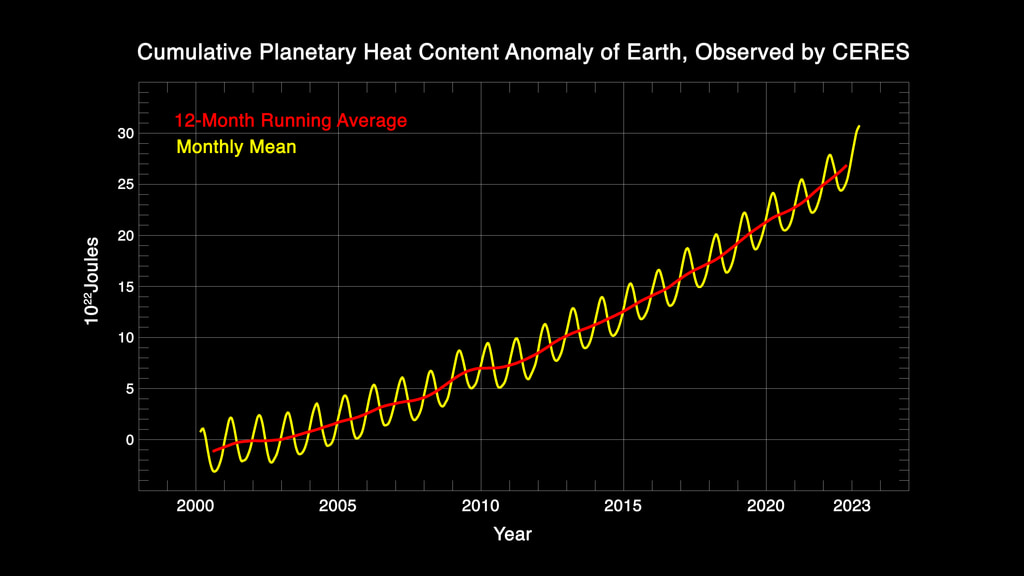
Cumulative planetary heat content anomaly of Earth observed by CERES

Earth's albedo as monitored by CERES. The northern hemisphere has darkened at a faster rate.

== Follow-on instruments ==
The 40+ year TOA radiation data record begun with ERBE in 1984 is at risk of a gap at the end of CERES missions.

=== Radiation Budget Instrument ===
The measurements of the CERES instruments were to be furthered by the Radiation Budget Instrument (RBI) to be launched on Joint Polar Satellite System-2 (JPSS-2) in 2021, JPSS-3 in 2026, and JPSS-4 in 2031. The project was cancelled on January 26, 2018; NASA cited technical, cost, and schedule issues and the impact of anticipated RBI cost growth on other programs.

=== Libera ===
NASA announced in February 2020 its selection of the Libera instrument to launch on JPSS-3 by the end of 2027. Libera is planned to provide data continuity and updated capabilities. LASP is the lead instrument developer.

=== Athena/Demeter ===
NASA also began in 2020 a project to develop ERB measurements integrated onto a SmallSat utilizing an ~10x reduced instrument size. The Athena EPIC demonstration launched in July 2025.

== See also ==
- Earth's energy budget
- Geostationary Earth Radiation Budget
- Radiometry
- Remote sensing
