= Tropospheric Emission Spectrometer =

Instrument on NASA's Aura satellite

Tropospheric Emission Spectrometer or TES was a satellite instrument designed to measure the state of the earth's troposphere.

== Overview ==
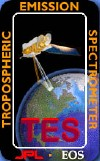
TES Mission Logo

TES was a high-resolution infrared Fourier Transform spectrometer and provided key data for studying tropospheric chemistry, troposphere-biosphere interaction, and troposphere-stratosphere exchanges. It was built for NASA by the Jet Propulsion Laboratory, California Institute of Technology in Pasadena, California. It was successfully launched into polar orbit by a Delta II 7920-10L rocket aboard NASA's third Earth Observing Systems spacecraft (EOS-Aura) at 10:02 UTC on July 15, 2004. Originally planned as a 5-year mission, it was decommissioned after almost 14 years on January 31, 2018.
