= Terra (satellite) =

NASA climate research satellite (1999–present)

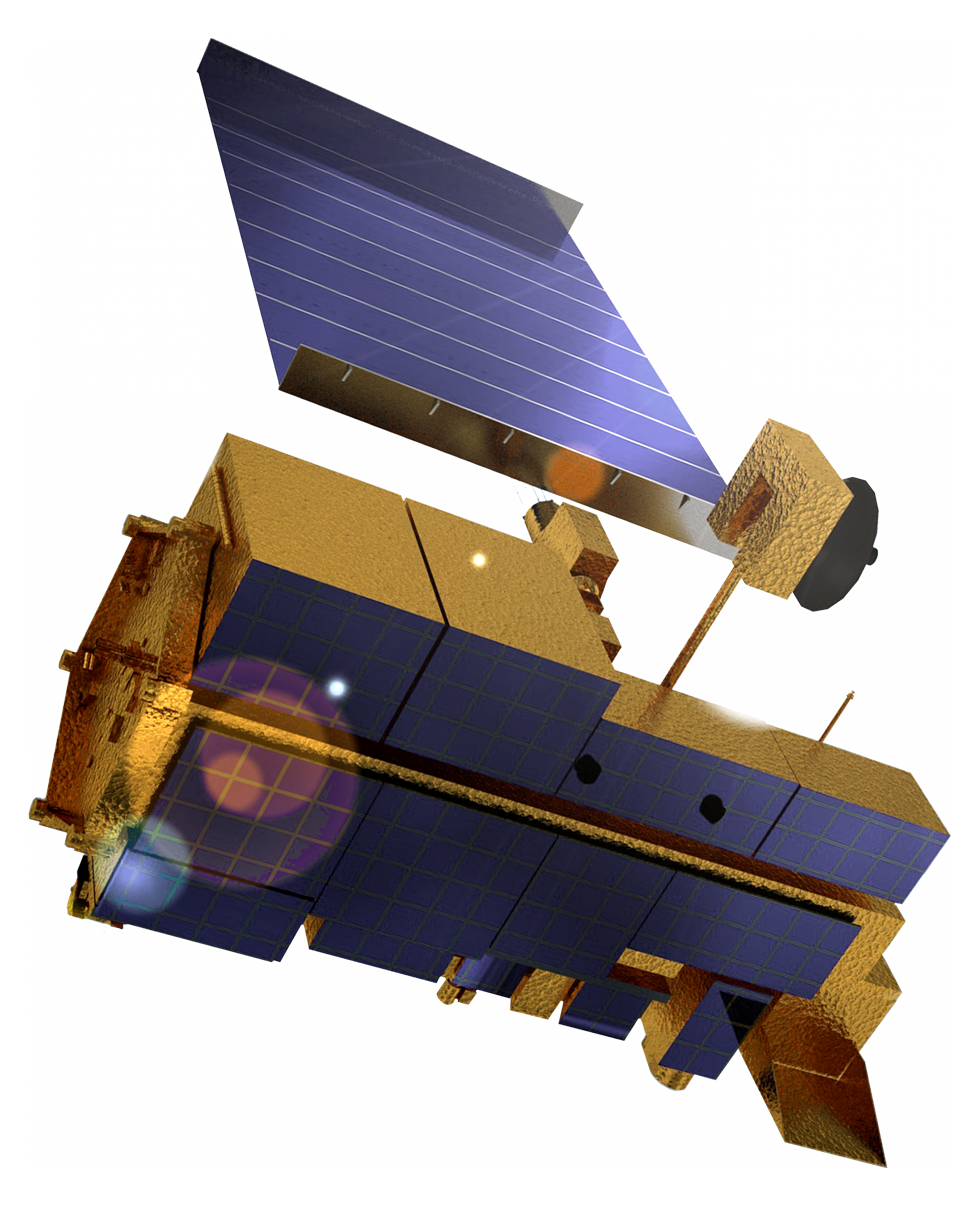
- Artistic rendering of the Terra satellite
- Names: EOS AM-1
- Mission type: Climate research
- Operator: NASA
- COSPAR ID: 1999-068A
- SATCAT no.: 25994
- Website: terra.nasa.gov
- Mission duration: 6 years (planned); 26 years, 11 months, 1 day (elapsed)

Spacecraft properties
- Manufacturer: NASA
- Launch mass: 4,864 kg (10,723 lb)

Start of mission
- Launch date: December 18, 1999, 18:57:39 UTC
- Rocket: Atlas IIAS; AC-141
- Launch site: Vandenberg SLC-3E
- Contractor: ILS

End of mission
- Disposal: Decommissioned
- Last contact: January 2027 (planned)

Orbital parameters
- Reference system: Geocentric
- Regime: Low Earth
- Semi-major axis: 7,080.0 km (4,399.3 mi)
- Eccentricity: 0.0001392
- Perigee altitude: 708.7 km (440.4 mi)
- Apogee altitude: 710.6 km (441.5 mi)
- Inclination: 98.2098°
- Period: 98.8 minutes
- RAAN: 251.31°
- Argument of perigee: 83.770°
- Mean anomaly: 276.37°
- Mean motion: 14.57110250
- Epoch: 25 June 2016, 02:58:27 UTC
- Revolution no.: 87,867
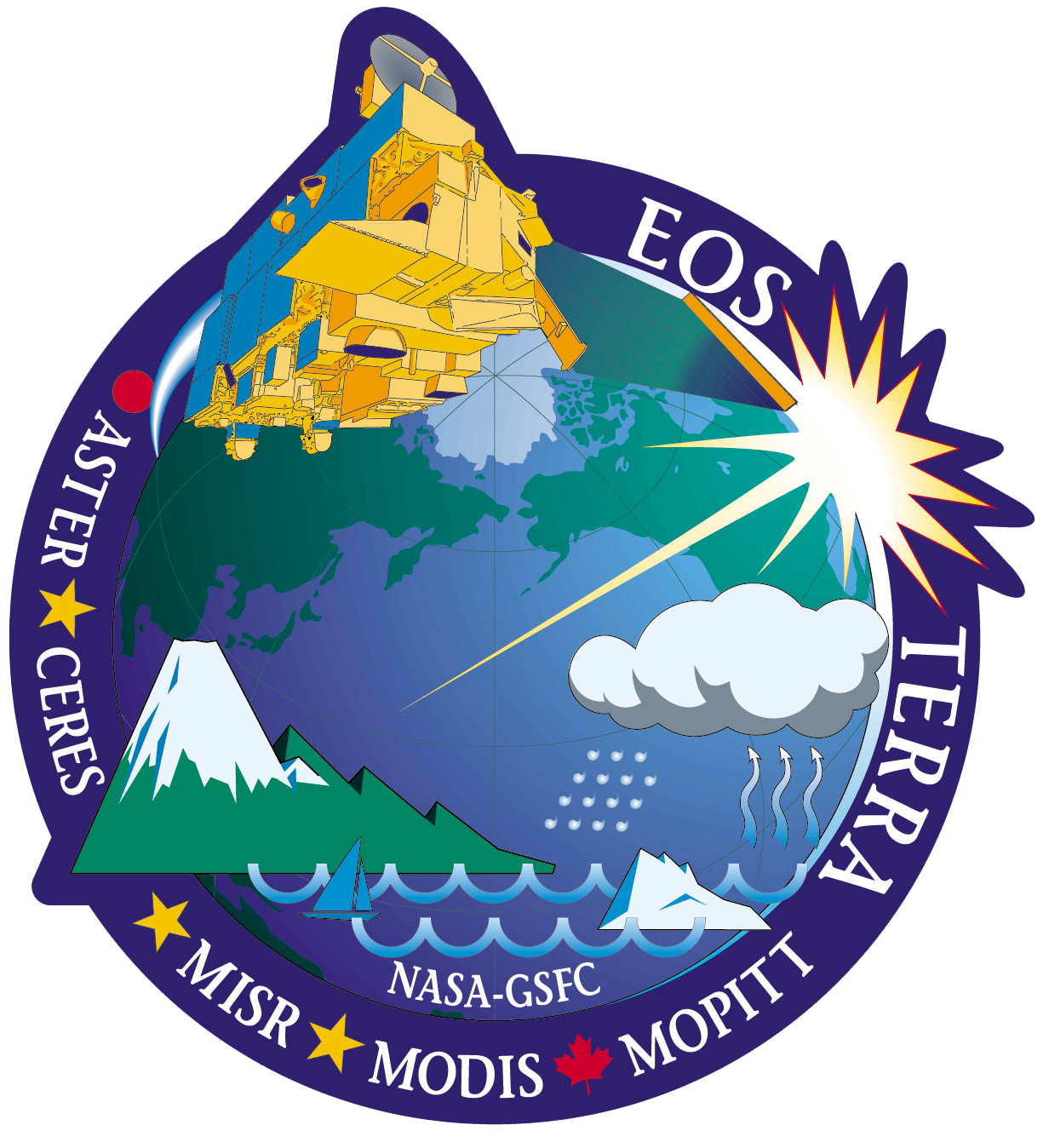
- Large Strategic Science Missions; Earth Science Division Earth Observing System

Terra (EOS AM-1) is a multi-national scientific research satellite operated by NASA in a Sun-synchronous orbit around the Earth. It takes simultaneous measurements of Earth's atmosphere, land, and water to understand how Earth is changing and to identify the consequences for life on Earth. It is the flagship of the Earth Observing System (EOS) and the first satellite of the system which was followed by Aqua (launched in 2002) and Aura (launched in 2004). Terra was launched in 1999, and is scheduled to be decommissioned on December 1, 2026.

The name "Terra" comes from the Latin word for Earth. A naming contest was held by NASA among U.S. high school students. The winning essay was submitted by Sasha Jones of Brentwood, Missouri. The identifier "AM-1" refers to its orbit, passing over the equator in the morning.

== Launch ==
The satellite was launched from Vandenberg Air Force Base on December 18th, 1999, aboard an Atlas IIAS vehicle and began collecting data on February 24th, 2000. It was placed into a near-polar, sun-synchronous orbit at an altitude of 705 km (438 mi), with a 10:30am descending node.

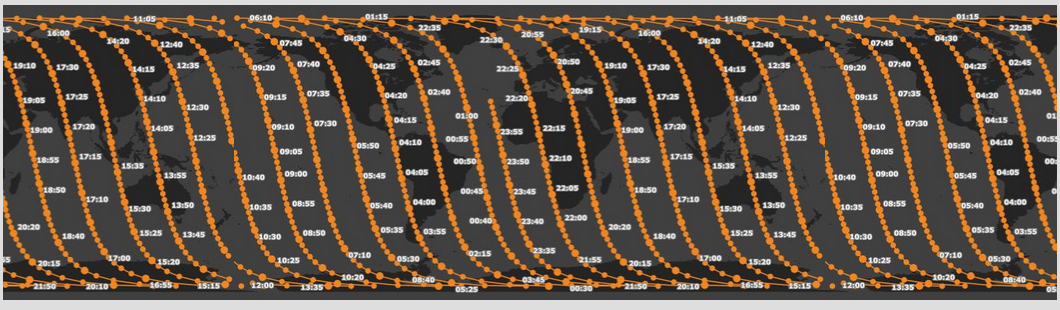
Terra's ascending orbital path in 2021

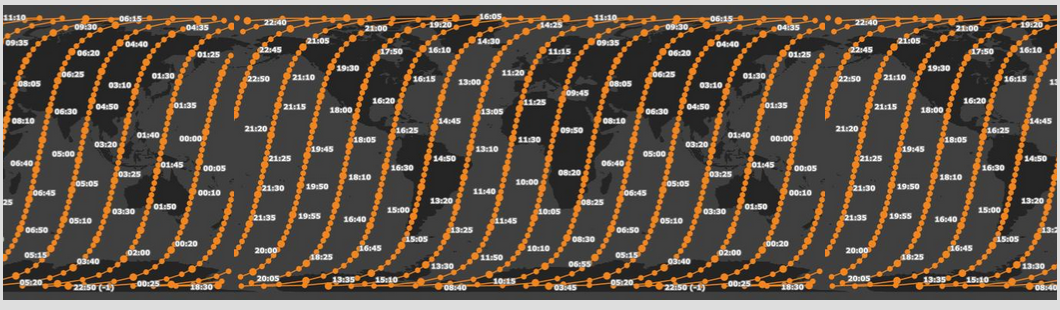
Terra's descending orbital path in 2021

== Instruments ==
Fireball over the Bering Sea viewed from space by the Terra satellite (December 18, 2018)

Terra carries a payload of five remote sensors designed to monitor the state of Earth's environment and ongoing changes in its climate system:

- ASTER (Advanced Spaceborne Thermal Emission and Reflection Radiometer) ASTER was provided by Japan's Ministry of Economy, Trade, and Industry. It creates high-resolution images of clouds, ice, water and the land surface using 3 different sensor subsystems: the Shortwave Infrared (SWIR); Thermal Infrared (TIR); and Visible and Near Infrared (VNIR). They cover 14 multi-spectral bands from visible to the thermal infrared. The SWIR stopped working in 2008.
- CERES (Clouds and the Earth's Radiant Energy System) Consisted of FM1 and FM2. The FM2 instrument was shut down in 2025.
- MISR (Multi-angle Imaging SpectroRadiometer)
- MODIS (Moderate-resolution Imaging Spectroradiometer)
- MOPITT (Measurements of Pollution in the Troposphere) The MOPITT was turned off in 2025.

Data from the satellite helps scientists better understand the spread of pollution around the globe. Studies have used instruments on Terra to examine trends in global carbon monoxide and aerosol pollution. The data collected by Terra will ultimately become a new, 15-year global data set.

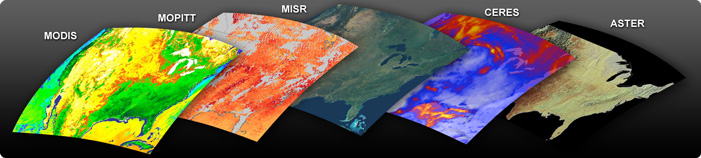
Instruments of EOS-AM1

== Operations ==
After launch, operators observed that high energy protons like those found over the South Atlantic Anomaly or the poles could induce single-event upsets that would cause the Motor Drive Assembly (MDA) Built-In Test Equipment (BITE) to turn off the MDA. These false shut-downs occurred 12–14 times a month and eventually the operations team automated the recovery to reduce the impact of these shut-downs.

Starting in 2007, increased thermal resistance in the SWIR cryocooler of the ASTER instrument caused the temperature to gradually increase. By 2008, despite frequent attempts to recycle the cryocooler, the data began to significantly degrade and on January 12, 2009, ASTER managers declared the SWIR no longer functional due to anomalously high SWIR detector temperatures. Data gathered after April 2008 was declared not usable.

On October 13, 2009, Terra suffered a single battery cell failure anomaly and a battery heater control anomaly likely the result of a Micrometeoroid or Orbital Debris (MMOD) strike.

On February 27, 2020, the Terra flight operations team conducted Terra's last inclination adjust maneuver due to the satellite's limited remaining fuel. With no more such maneuvers, Terra's mean local time began to drift starting in April 2021 and with it, its data quality began to decrease. By October of 2022, Terra had started to exceed a 10:15 AM MLT crossing and so on October 12th and October 19th Terra's flight operators performed Constellation Exit Maneuvers to lower Terra's orbit to 694km and exit the constellation. Despite earlier indications that this would lead to decommissioning, operations continued with only minor adjustments.

Decommissioning finally began in 2025. In January the CERES(FM2) instrument was turned off due to battery constraints. On February 1 the MOPITT instrument was switched to safe mode and then turned off on April 9, 2025, also for power conservation reasons.

As of late 2025, Terra was expected to continue operating until February 2027.

== Malicious cyber activities ==
In June and October 2008 the spacecraft was targeted by hackers who gained unauthorized access to its command and control systems, but did not issue any commands.

== Gallery of images by Terra ==
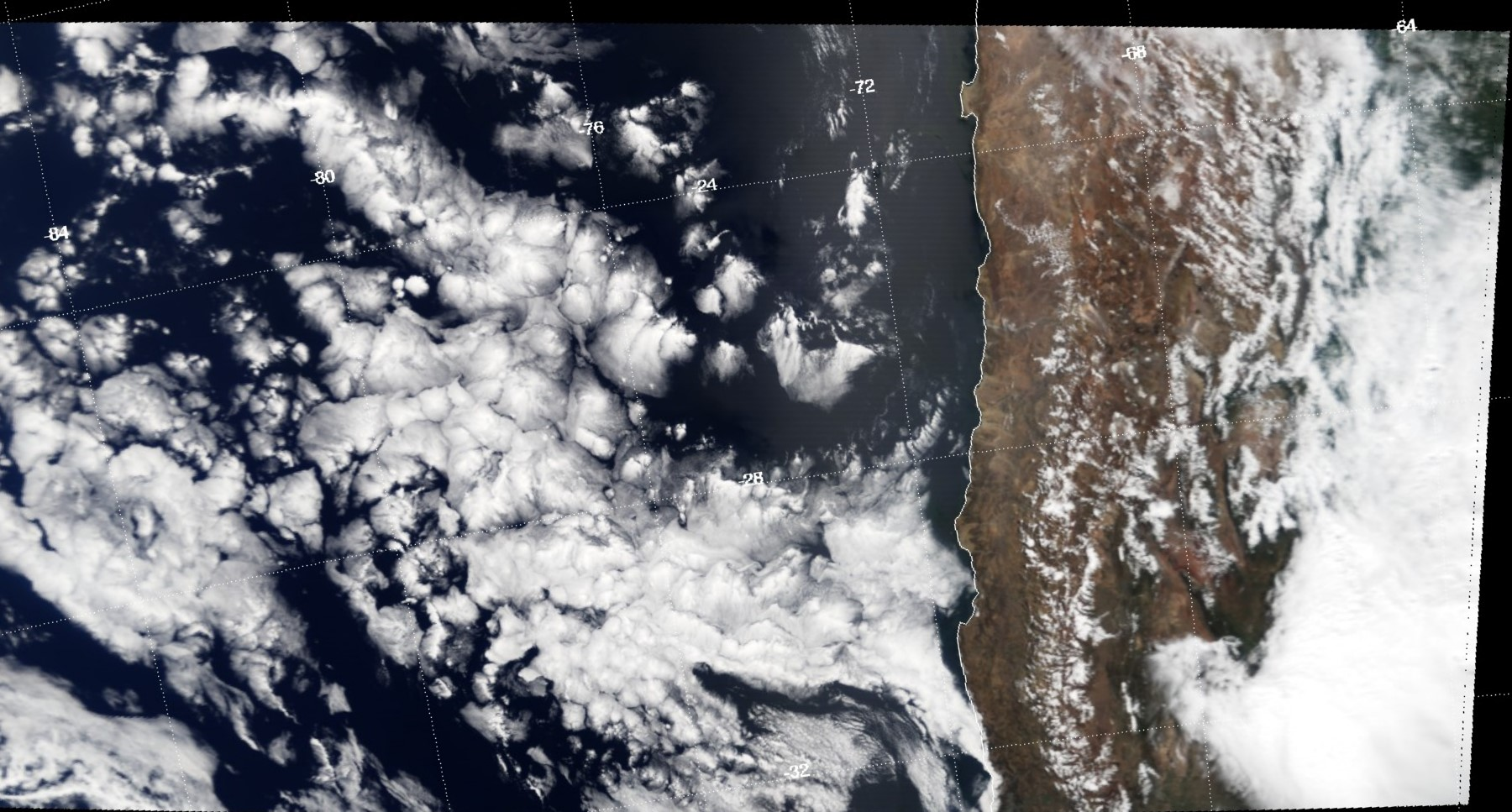
The first image taken by Terra.

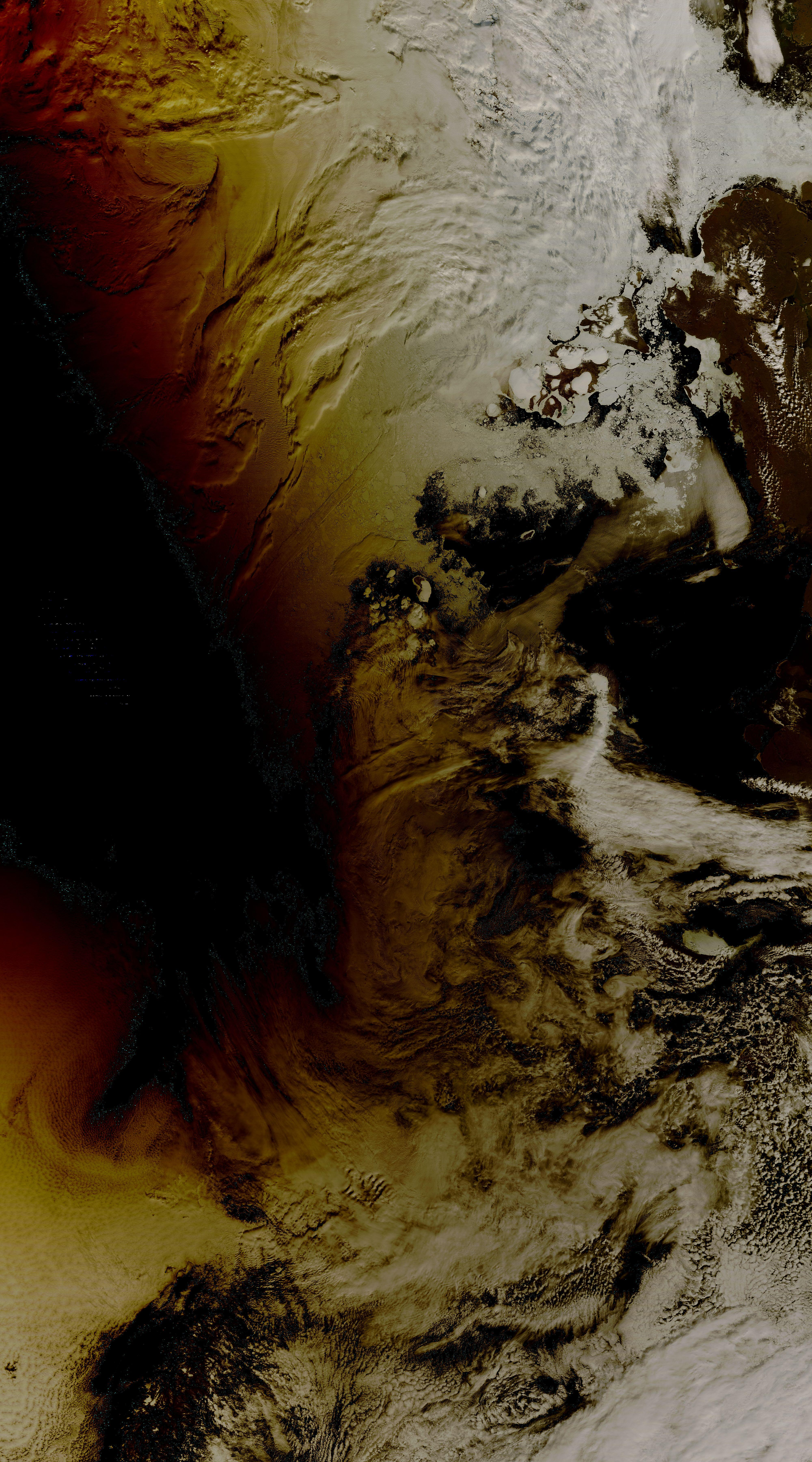
The Solar eclipse of August 1, 2008, over Russia, Norway, and the Arctic Ocean as seen from NASA's Terra satellite.

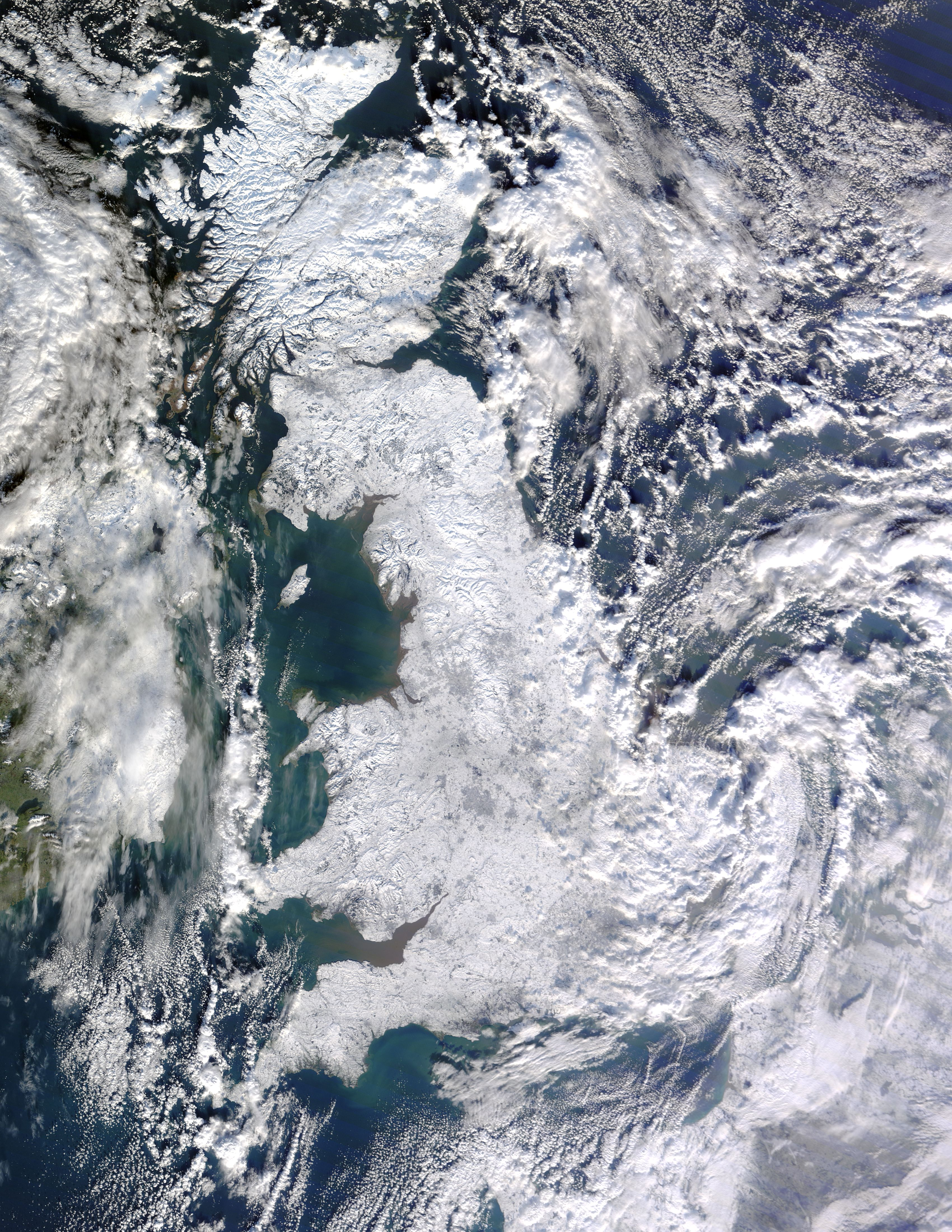
The effects of the European winter storms of 2009–2010 on Great Britain, seen from Terra.

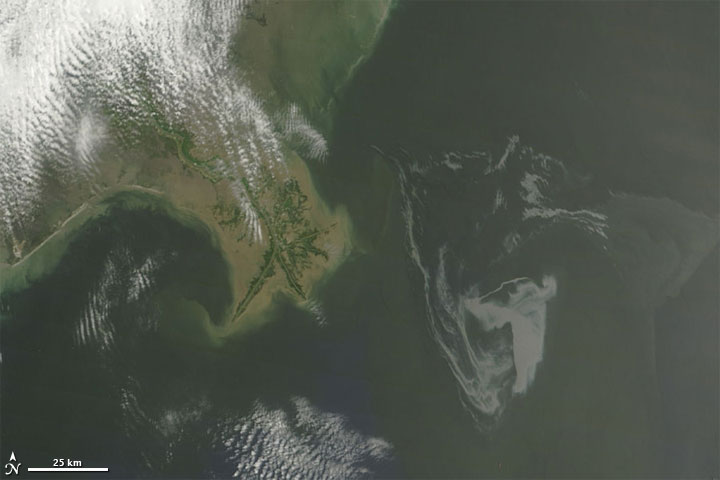
The Deepwater Horizon oil spill oil slick as seen from space by NASA's Terra satellite on May 1, 2010.

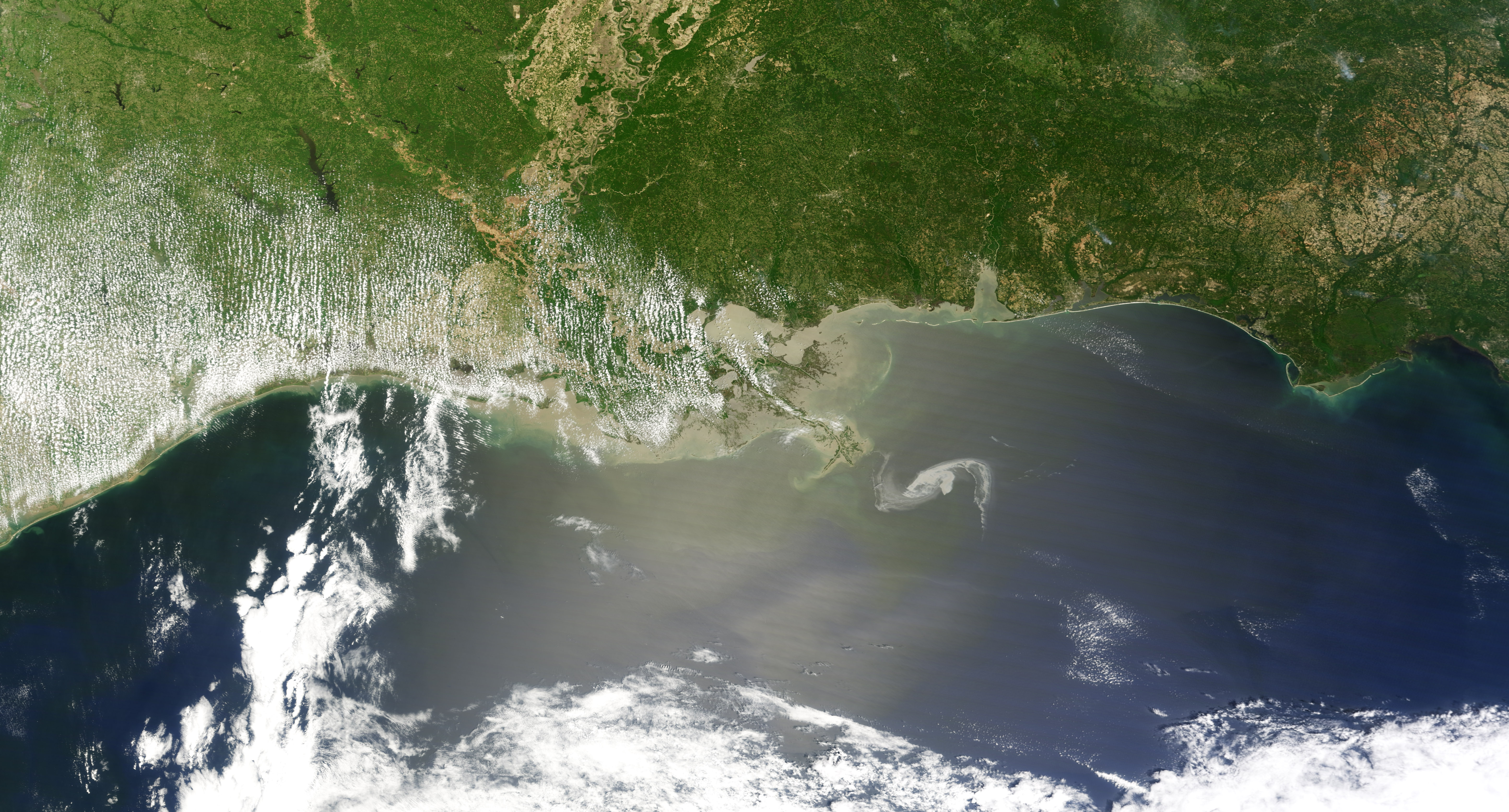
The Deepwater Horizon oil slick just off the Louisiana coast on April 30, 2010, visible from space.

Hurricane Karl, the most destructive hurricane of the 2010 Atlantic Hurricane Season, approaches Mexico on September 16.

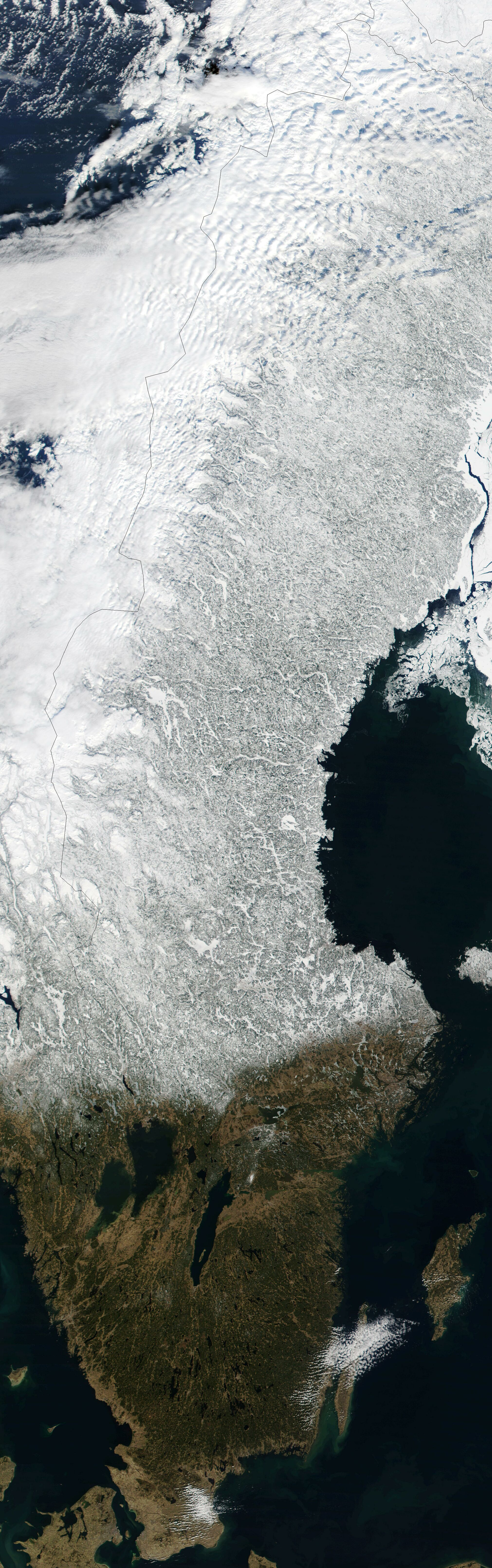
Satellite image of Sweden in March 2002.

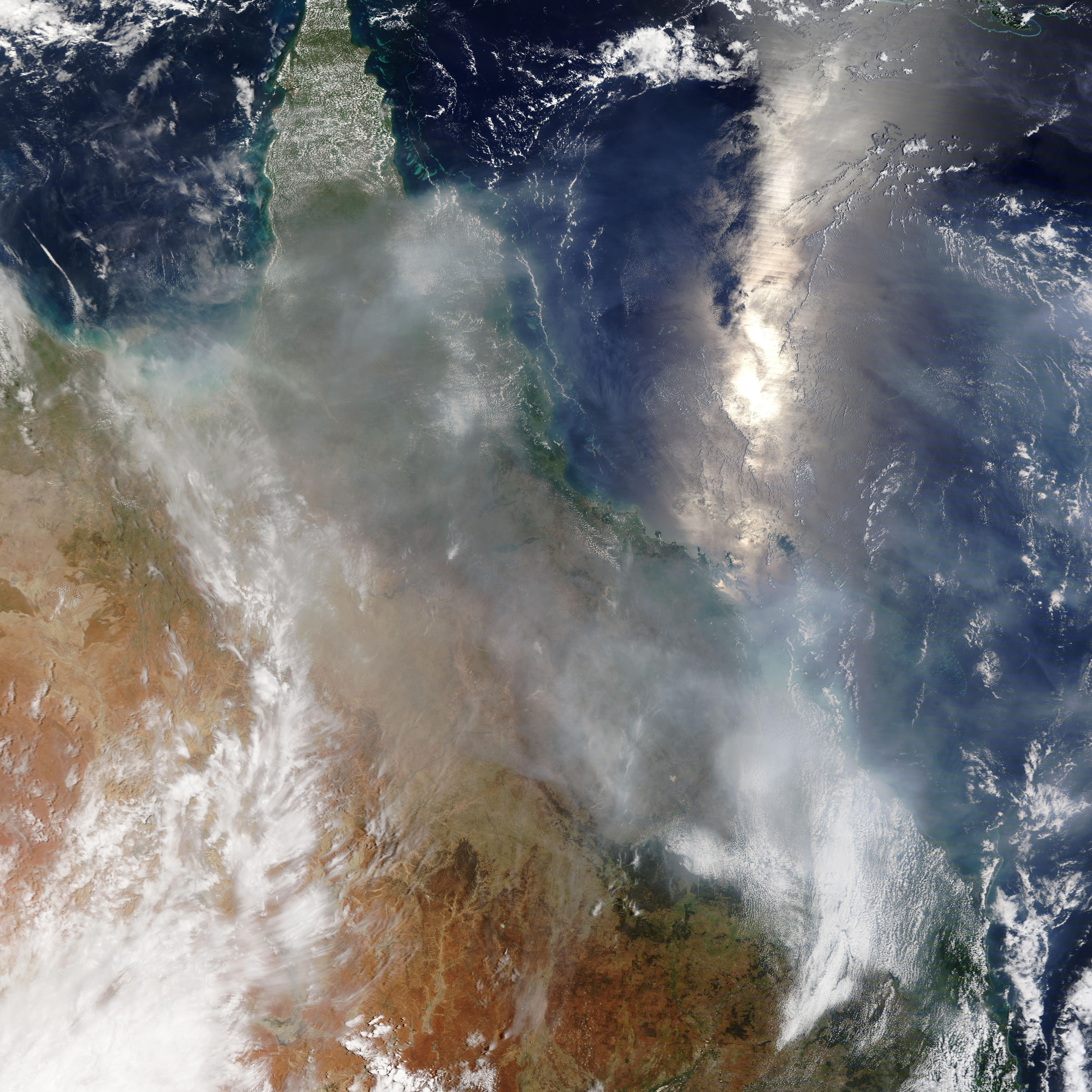
Satellite image of the Ash distribution over Australia from the 2022 Hunga Tonga–Hunga Ha'apai eruption.

Animation of Terra's orbit around the Earth. Earth is not shown.

== See also ==
- Aqua (satellite)
- Artificial structures visible from space
- Aura (satellite)
- Fire Information for Resource Management System (FIRMS) – provides information on active fire locations as part of NASA's Earth Science Data Systems program
