= Aura (satellite) =

NASA Earth observation satellite (2004–present)

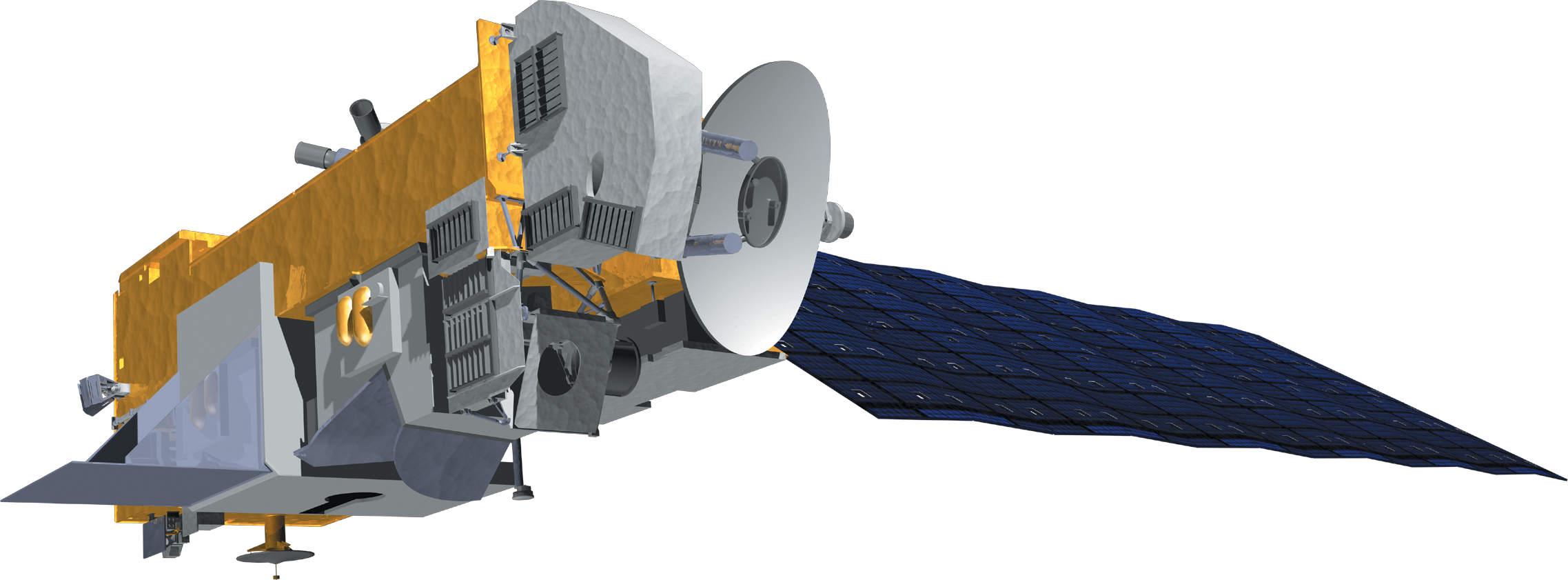
- Artist's rendering of the Aura satellite
- Names: EOS CH-1
- Mission type: Earth Observation
- Operator: NASA
- COSPAR ID: 2004-026A
- SATCAT no.: 28376
- Website: aura.gsfc.nasa.gov
- Mission duration: 22 years, 2 months, 11 days (elapsed)

Spacecraft properties
- Bus: T330 (AB-1200)
- Manufacturer: Northrop Grumman
- Launch mass: 2,970 kilograms (6,550 lb)
- Dimensions: 4.70 m x 17.37 m x 6.91 m
- Power: 4.6 kW

Start of mission
- Launch date: July 15, 2004, 10:01:51 UTC
- Rocket: Delta II 7920-10L; D-306
- Launch site: Vandenberg SLC-2W

End of mission
- Last contact: 2036 (planned)
- Decay date: 2048 (planned)

Orbital parameters
- Reference system: Geocentric
- Regime: Sun-synchronous
- Semi-major axis: 7,080.7 kilometers (4,399.7 mi)
- Eccentricity: 0.0001111
- Perigee altitude: 708 kilometers (440 mi)
- Apogee altitude: 710 kilometers (440 mi)
- Inclination: 98.22 degrees
- Period: 98.83 minutes
- RAAN: 96.8126 degrees
- Argument of perigee: 89.5089 degrees
- Mean anomaly: 270.6277 degrees
- Mean motion: 14.57112850
- Epoch: 25 January 2015, 03:15:27 UTC
- Large Strategic Science Missions; Earth Science Division Earth Observing System

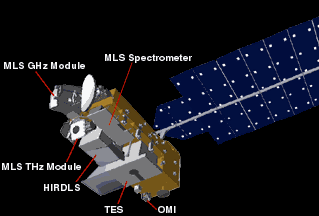
Aura instruments.

Aura (EOS CH-1) is a multi-national NASA scientific research satellite in orbit around the Earth, studying the Earth's ozone layer, air quality and climate. It is the third major component of the Earth Observing System (EOS) following on Terra (launched 1999) and Aqua (launched 2002). Aura follows on from the Upper Atmosphere Research Satellite (UARS). Aura is a joint mission between NASA, the Netherlands, Finland, and the U.K. The Aura spacecraft is healthy and is expected to operate until at least 2028, possibly beyond, however only two of its four instruments are functioning nominally.

The name "Aura" comes from the Latin word for air. The satellite was launched from Vandenberg Air Force Base on July 15, 2004, aboard a Delta II 7920-10L rocket.

The Aura spacecraft has a mass of about 1,765 kg (3,891 lb). The body is 6.9 m (23 ft) long with the extended single solar panel about 15 m (49 ft) long.

Aura originally flew in a Sun-synchronous orbit, in formation with three other satellites, collectively known as the "A Train"; it is last in the formation. The other satellites in the formation are:

- OCO-2
- GCOM-W1

All satellites have an equatorial crossing time at about 1:30 in the afternoon, thus the name 'A (Afternoon) Train'.

Aura's orbital inclination of 98.2° and right ascension of ascending node (RAAN, or longitude of ascending node) of 96.8126°, has its ascending node in daylight. With an orbital period of 98.83 minutes, it has a sixteen-day repeat cycle and 233 revolutions per cycle. Since 2023, Aura has been allowed to drift to save fuel.

== Mission ==
As of 2015, there had been 1589 Aura-related journal articles. The scientific findings of these studies address key NASA research objectives related to stratospheric composition, air quality, and climate change.

Aura has suffered some minor, non-mission ending anomalies.

On January 12, 2005, a solar array connector partially "unzipped" losing temperature telemetry and power from part of the solar array. On March 12, 2010, Aura lost power from one-half of one of the 11 solar panels and this was attributed to a Micrometeoroid Orbital Debris (MMOD) strike. These events, and 9 other anomalies in the array regulation electronics (ARE), have resulted in an estimated loss of 33 out of 132 solar strings. Nonetheless, the mission is estimated to have ample power capabilities to supply the mission until fuel runs out.

A Formatter Multiplexer Unit (FMU) / Solid State Recorder (SSR) anomaly was first detected in December 2007. New symptoms were detected in January 2017 and starting on March 21, 2017, Aura no longer recorded housekeeping data to partition 31.

In December 2016, reaction wheel #3 spun down. It was recovered 10 days later.

On January 31, 2018, the TES instrument was decommissioned due to degrading operations. A mechanical arm on the instrument began stalling intermittently in 2010, affecting TES's ability to collect data continuously. Despite the adaptations of TES operators, the degradation got worse with time and in 2017 the instrument lost operations for approximately half the year. It continues to receive enough power to keep it from getting too cold which could affect the two remaining functioning instruments. Operators initiated a series of End of Life tests of the TES laser that lasted into at least 2022.

Fuel depletion became a problem for the satellite in the 2020s. The final Drag Make-Up (DMU) maneuvers were performed in January 2023 and the final Inclination Adjust Maneuver(IAM) was performed in April 2023 to save remaining fuel for a safe de-orbit. As a result, the spacecraft has started to drift and lose altitude, but it should only lose a few kilometers of altitude by the end of the mission.

As of 2026, insufficient power generation by the solar array is conservatively predicted to be the life-limiting factor for the Aura satellite and instruments by July 2028. Predicted re-entry would be 2048. In its 2025 "skinny budget" request, the Trump Administration proposed terminating the Aura mission early, however in early 2026 NASA was requesting partners for operations and data collection for Aura, Aqua and Terra.

== Instruments ==
Aura carries four instruments for studies of atmospheric chemistry:

- HIRDLS — High Resolution Dynamics Limb Sounder — measures infrared radiation from ozone, water vapor, CFCs, methane and nitrogen compounds. Developed jointly with the United Kingdom Natural Environment Research Council. HIRDLS capabilities were compromised at launch when a piece of Kapton film in the instrument came loose and blocked much of the aperture, allowing only a partial view. The blockage prevented certain types of observations and necessitated the development of algorithms to remove the effects due to the blockage. This unanticipated algorithm developmental effort delayed data delivery. The HIRDLS chopper motor stalled on March 17, 2008, and HIRDLS has not produced science since.
- MLS — Microwave Limb Sounder — measures emissions from ozone, chlorine and other trace gases, and helps to clarify the role of water vapor in global warming. The MLS instrument package is divided into the THz, GHz, and spectrometer modules. The THz module was developed to measure the OH radical in the stratosphere and mesosphere using heterodyne detection of thermal emission. These modules observe emissions across 20 bands. In February 2006, band 13, the primary MLS band for measuring HCl, began to exhibit symptoms of aging and was deactivated to conserve life. It now only makes periodic observations. On August 6, 2013, band 12, which measures N_{2}O, shut down.
- OMI — Ozone Monitoring Instrument — uses ultraviolet and visible radiation to produce daily high-resolution maps. Developed by the Finnish Meteorological Institute and the Netherlands Agency for Aerospace Programmes. In 2007, OMI began to experience a "row anomaly" which affected the quality of the radiance data. The row anomaly has continued to progress since then, with periods of stability.
- TES — Tropospheric Emission Spectrometer — measured tropospheric ozone in infrared wavelengths, also carbon monoxide, methane and nitrogen oxides. TES's laser A, which was used for retrieving interferometer control, began operating below peak in 2007 but was resurrected to replace laser B which ceased operation in August 2016. Laser A then operated at only 10% power. In 2011, TES observations were shifted from global survey mode, in which it made continuous observations, to special operations mode, wherein it made high sample density observations over specific targets. Furthermore, the TES Interferometer Control System (ICS) motor began stalling in 2015. Each stall took days or weeks to recover from and as of 2018 there had been 19 of them. As a result, in early 2018 the instrument was decommissioned.

Animation of Aura's orbit around Earth. Earth is not shown

== See also ==
- Aqua (satellite)
- Terra (satellite)
