= International Global Atmospheric Chemistry =

The International Global Atmospheric Chemistry (IGAC) project is a non-profit organization created in the late 1980s to address growing international concerns over rapid changes observed in Earth's atmosphere.

It developed under joint sponsorship of the Commission on Atmospheric Chemistry and Global Pollution (CACGP) of the International Association of Meteorology and Atmospheric Sciences (IAMAS), and the International Geosphere-Biosphere Programme (IGBP).
