= Microwave limb sounder =

Satellite measurement technique

The microwave limb sounder (MLS) experiments measure (naturally occurring) microwave thermal emission from the limb (edge) of Earth's upper atmosphere. The data is used to create vertical profiles of atmospheric gases, temperature, pressure, and cloud ice.

== History ==
- 12 September 1991 – NASA launches Upper Atmosphere Research Satellite (UARS) STS-48 mission, largely in response to threat of chlorofluorocarbons to ozone layer.
- 15 July 2004 – NASA launches Earth Observing System (EOS) Aura mission with overall scientific objectives of determining whether global stratospheric ozone is recovering, measuring composition effects on climate variability, and studying pollution in the upper troposphere.

== See also ==
- Remote sensing
- Radio occultation
- Scatterometer
- High-resolution dynamics limb sounder
