= Moderate Resolution Imaging Spectroradiometer =

Payload imaging sensor

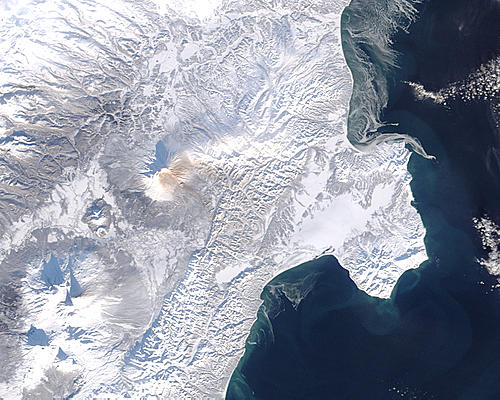
Ash plumes on Kamchatka Peninsula, eastern Russia.

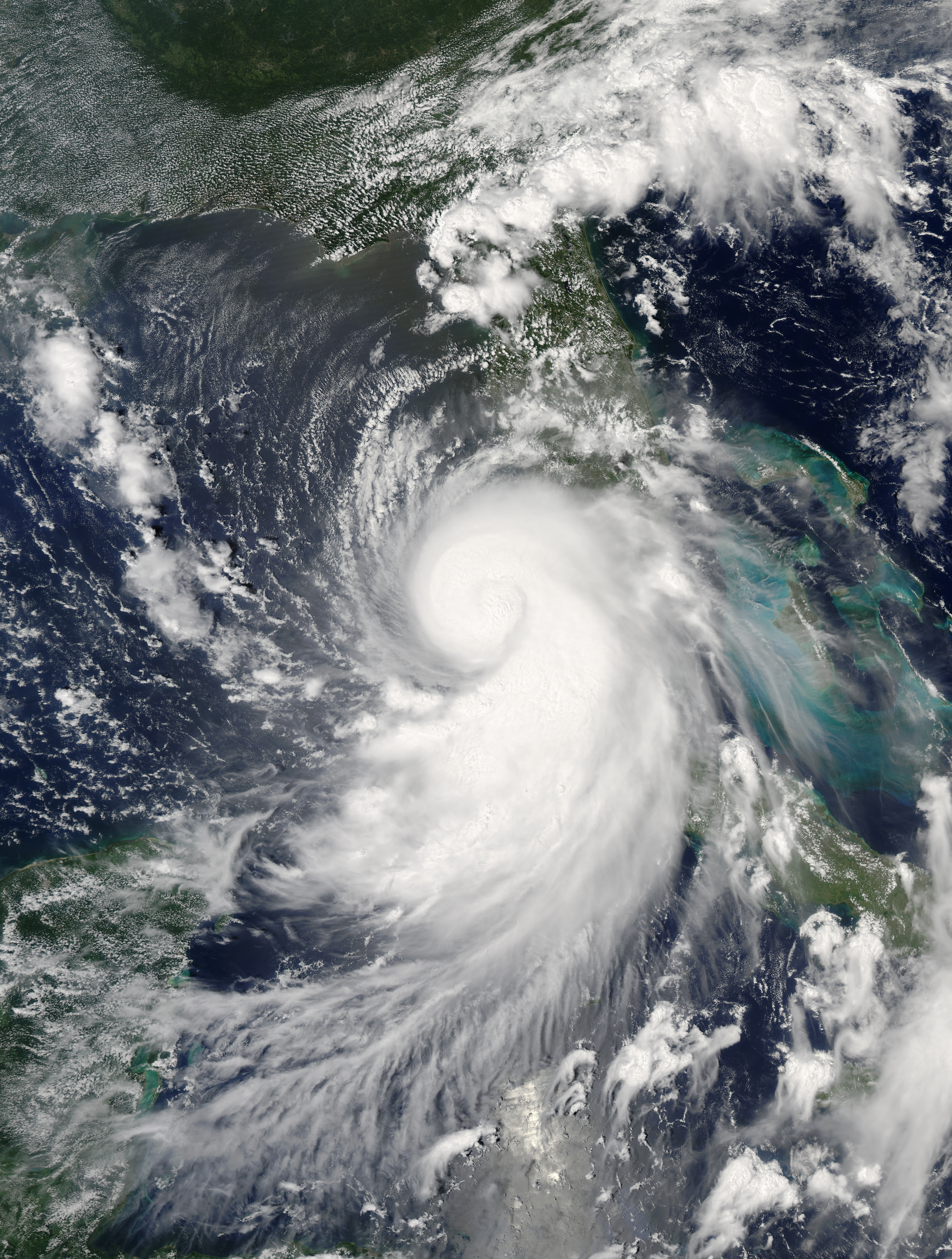
Hurricane Katrina near the Florida peninsula.

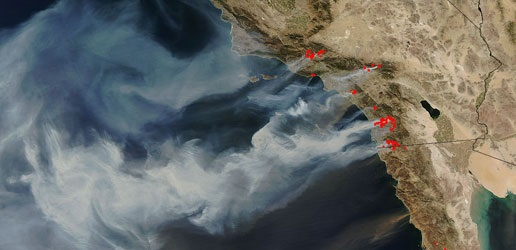
California wildfires.

Solar irradiance spectrum and MODIS bands.

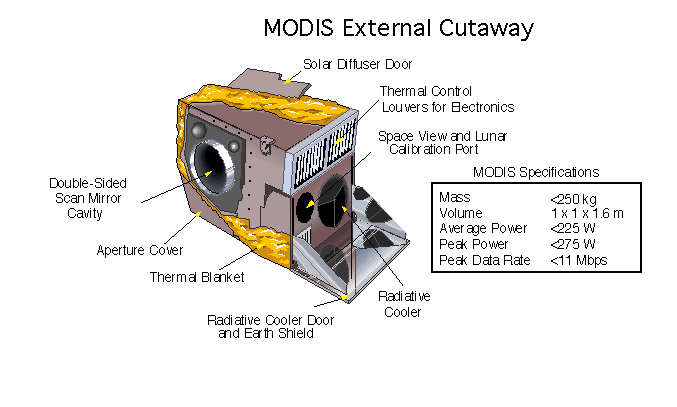
External view of the MODIS unit.

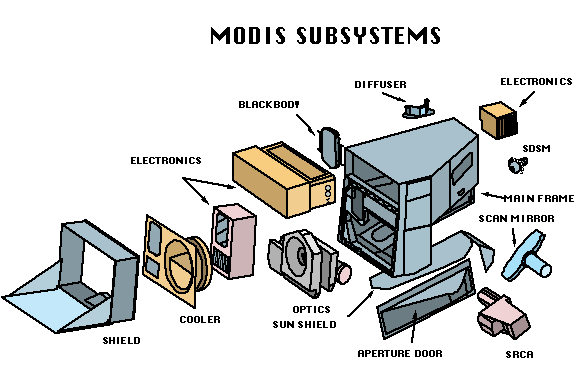
Exploded view of the MODIS subsystems.

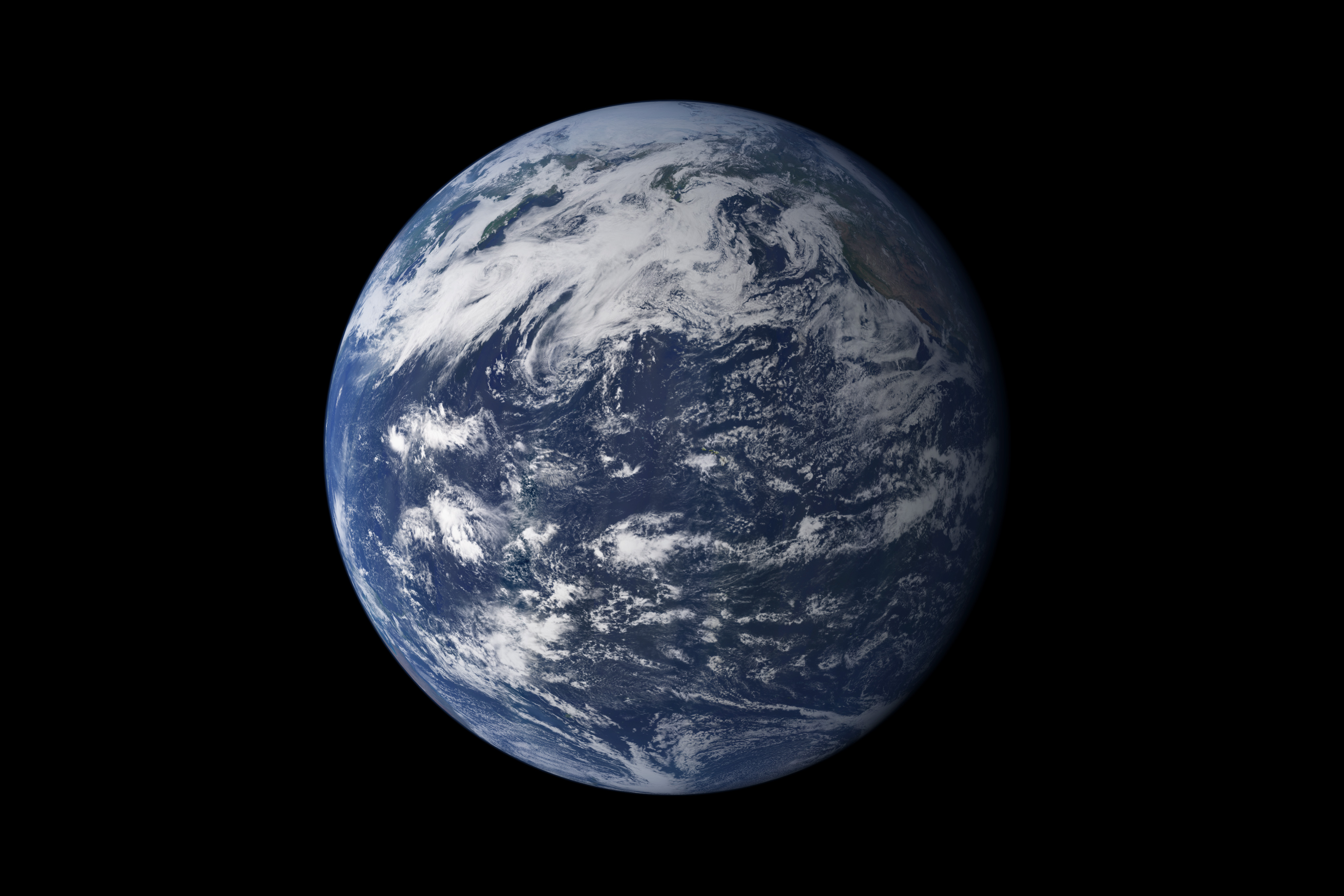
This detailed, photo-like view of Earth is based largely on observations from MODIS.

The Moderate Resolution Imaging Spectroradiometer (MODIS) is a satellite-based sensor used for earth and climate measurements. There are two MODIS sensors in Earth orbit: one on board the Terra (EOS AM) satellite, launched by NASA in 1999; and one on board the Aqua (EOS PM) satellite, launched in 2002. Since 2011, MODIS operations have been supplemented by VIIRS sensors, such as the one aboard Suomi NPP. The systems often conduct similar operations due to their similar designs and orbits (with VIIRS data systems designed to be compatible with MODIS), though they have subtle differences contributing to similar but not identical uses.

The MODIS instruments were built by Santa Barbara Remote Sensing. They capture data in 36 spectral bands ranging in wavelength from 0.4 μm to 14.4 μm and at varying spatial resolutions (2 bands at 250 m, 5 bands at 500 m and 29 bands at 1 km). Together the instruments image the entire Earth every 1 to 2 days. They are designed to provide measurements in large-scale global dynamics including changes in Earth's cloud cover, radiation budget and processes occurring in the oceans, on land, and in the lower atmosphere.

Support and calibration is provided by the MODIS characterization support team (MCST).

== Applications ==
With its high temporal resolution although low spatial resolution, MODIS data are useful to track changes in the landscape over time. Examples of such applications are the monitoring of vegetation health by means of time-series analyses with vegetation indices, long term land cover changes (e.g. to monitor deforestation rates), global snow cover trends, water inundation from pluvial, riverine, or sea level rise flooding in coastal areas, change of water levels of major lakes such as the Aral Sea, and the detection and mapping of wildland fires in the United States. The United States Forest Service's Remote Sensing Applications Center analyzes MODIS imagery on a continuous basis to provide information for the management and suppression of wildfires.

== Specifications ==
Specifications
Orbit	705 km, 10:30 a.m. descending node (Terra) or 1:30 p.m. ascending node (Aqua), Sun-synchronous, near-polar, circular
Scan rate	20.3 rpm, cross track
Swath	2330 km (cross track) by 10 km (along track at nadir)
Dimensions
Telescope	17.78 cm diam. off-axis, afocal (collimated), with intermediate field stop
Size	1.0 × 1.6 × 1.0 m
Weight	228.7 kg
Power	162.5 W (single orbit average)
Data rate	10.6 Mbit/s (peak daytime); 6.1 Mbit/s (orbital average)
Quantization	12 bits
Spatial resolution	250 m (bands 1–2) 500 m (bands 3–7) 1000 m (bands 8–36)
Temporal resolution	1–2 days
Design life	6 years

=== Calibration ===
MODIS utilizes four on-board calibrators in addition to the space view in order to provide in-flight calibration: solar diffuser (SD), solar diffuser stability monitor (SDSM), spectral radiometric calibration assembly (SRCA), and a v-groove black body. MODIS has used the marine optical buoy for vicarious calibration.

== MODIS bands ==
Band	Wavelength (nm)	Resolution (m)	Primary use
1	620–670	250	Land/cloud/aerosols boundaries
2	841–876	250	Land/cloud/aerosols boundaries
3	459–479	500	Land/cloud/aerosols properties
4	545–565	500	Land/cloud/aerosols properties
5	1230–1250	500	Land/cloud/aerosols properties
6	1628–1652	500	Land/cloud/aerosols properties
7	2105–2155	500	Land/cloud/aerosols properties
8	405–420	1000	Ocean color/ phytoplankton/ biogeochemistry
9	438–448	1000	Ocean color/ phytoplankton/ biogeochemistry
10	483–493	1000	Ocean color/ phytoplankton/ biogeochemistry
11	526–536	1000	Ocean color/ phytoplankton/ biogeochemistry
12	546–556	1000	Ocean color/ phytoplankton/ biogeochemistry
13	662–672	1000	Ocean color/ phytoplankton/ biogeochemistry
14	673–683	1000	Ocean color/ phytoplankton/ biogeochemistry
15	743–753	1000	Ocean color/ phytoplankton/ biogeochemistry
16	862–877	1000	Ocean color/ phytoplankton/ biogeochemistry
17	890–920	1000	Atmospheric water vapor
18	931–941	1000	Atmospheric water vapor
19	915–965	1000	Atmospheric water vapor
Band	Wavelength (μm)	Resolution (m)	Primary use
20	3.660–3.840	1000	Surface/cloud temperature
21	3.929–3.989	1000	Surface/cloud temperature
22	3.929–3.989	1000	Surface/cloud temperature
23	4.020–4.080	1000	Surface/cloud temperature
24	4.433–4.498	1000	Atmospheric temperature
25	4.482–4.549	1000	Atmospheric temperature
26	1.360–1.390	1000	Cirrus clouds water vapor
27	6.535–6.895	1000	Cirrus clouds water vapor
28	7.175–7.475	1000	Cirrus clouds water vapor
29	8.400–8.700	1000	Cloud properties
30	9.580–9.880	1000	Ozone
31	10.780–11.280	1000	Surface/cloud temperature
32	11.770–12.270	1000	Surface/cloud temperature
33	13.185–13.485	1000	Cloud top altitude
34	13.485–13.785	1000	Cloud top altitude
35	13.785–14.085	1000	Cloud top altitude
36	14.085–14.385	1000	Cloud top altitude

== MODIS data ==
=== MODIS Level 3 datasets ===
The following MODIS Level 3 (L3) datasets are available from NASA, as processed by the Collection 5 software.

Daily	8-day	16-day	32-day	Monthly	Yearly	Grid	Platform	Description
MxD08_D3	MxD08_E3	—	—	MxD08_M3	—	1° CMG	Terra, Aqua	Aerosol, cloud water vapor, ozone
MxD10A1	MxD10A2	—	—	—	—	500 m SIN	Terra, Aqua	Snow cover
MxD11A1	MxD11A2	—	—	—	—	1000 m SIN	Terra, Aqua	Land surface temperature/emissivity
MxD11B1	—	—	—	—	—	6000 m SIN	Terra, Aqua	Land surface temperature/emissivity
MxD11C1	MxD11C2	—	—	MxD11C3	—	0.05° CMG	Terra, Aqua	Land surface temperature/emissivity
—	—	MxD13C1	—	MxD13C2	—	0.05° CMG	Terra, Aqua	Vegetation indices
MxD14A1	MxD14A2	—	—	—	—	1000 m SIN	Terra, Aqua	Thermal anomalies, fire
—	—	—	—	MCD45A1	—	500 m SIN	Terra+Aqua	Burned area

250 m SIN	500 m SIN	1000 m SIN	0.05° CMG	1° CMG	Time window	Platform	Description
MxD09Q1	MxD09A1	—	—	—	8-day	Terra, Aqua	Surface reflectance
—	—	—	MxD09CMG	—	Daily	Terra, Aqua	Surface reflectance
—	MCD12Q1	—	MCD12C1	—	Yearly	Terra+Aqua	Land cover type
—	MCD12Q2	—	—	—	Yearly	Terra+Aqua	Land cover dynamics (global vegetation phenology)
MxD13Q1	MxD13A1	MxD13A2	MxD13C1	—	16-day	Terra, Aqua	Vegetation indices
—	—	MxD13A3	MxD13C2	—	Monthly	Terra, Aqua	Vegetation indices
—	MCD43A1	MCD43B1	MCD43C1	—	16-day	Terra+Aqua	BRDF/albedo model parameters
—	MCD43A3	MCD43B3	MCD43C3	—	16-day	Terra+Aqua	Albedo
—	MCD43A4	MCD43B4	MCD43C4	—	16-day	Terra+Aqua	Nadir BRDF-adjusted reflectance

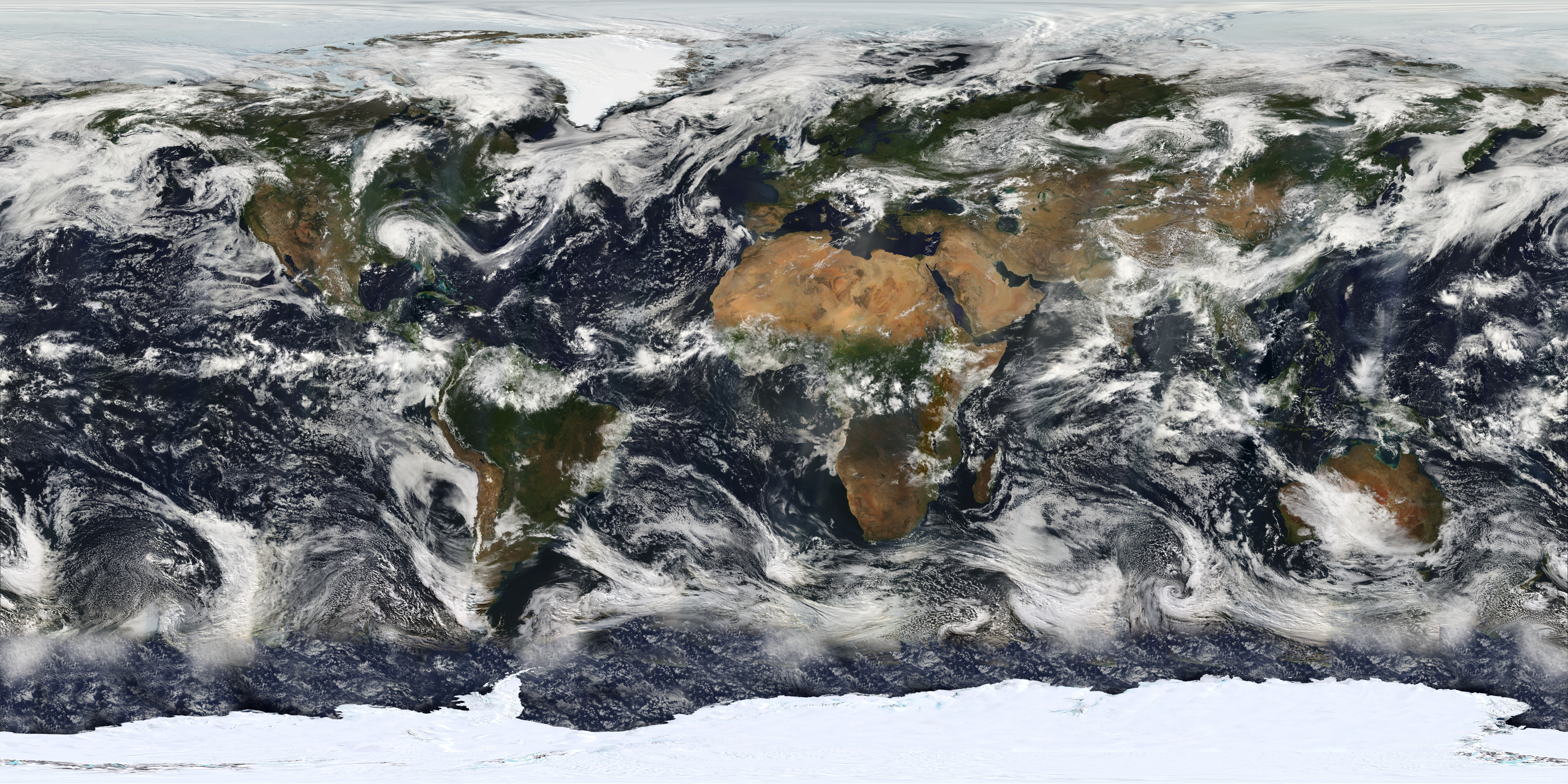
Image based on observations from MODIS

== See also ==
- Imaging spectroscopy
- NASA WorldWind
- Aqua (satellite)
- Terra (satellite)
- Fire Information for Resource Management System
