= Earth Observing System =

NASA program involving satellites

Program overview
- Country: United States
- Organization: NASA
- Purpose: Observe Earth to improve understanding of climate, weather, land and atmosphere
- Status: Active

Program history
- Cost: $33 Billion USD
- Uncrewed vehicle: All

The Earth Observing System (EOS) is a program of NASA comprising a series of artificial satellite missions and scientific instruments in Earth orbit designed for long-term global observations of the land surface, biosphere, atmosphere, and oceans. Since the early 1970s, NASA has been developing its Earth Observing System, launching a series of Landsat satellites in the decade. Some of the first included passive microwave imaging in 1972 through the Nimbus 5 satellite. Following the launch of various satellite missions, the conception of the program began in the late 1980s and expanded rapidly through the 1990s. Since the inception of the program, it has continued to develop, including; land, sea, radiation and atmosphere. Collected in a system known as EOSDIS, NASA uses this data in order to study the progression and changes in the biosphere of Earth. The main focus of this data collection surrounds climatic science. The program is the centrepiece of NASA's Earth Science Enterprise.

== History and development ==
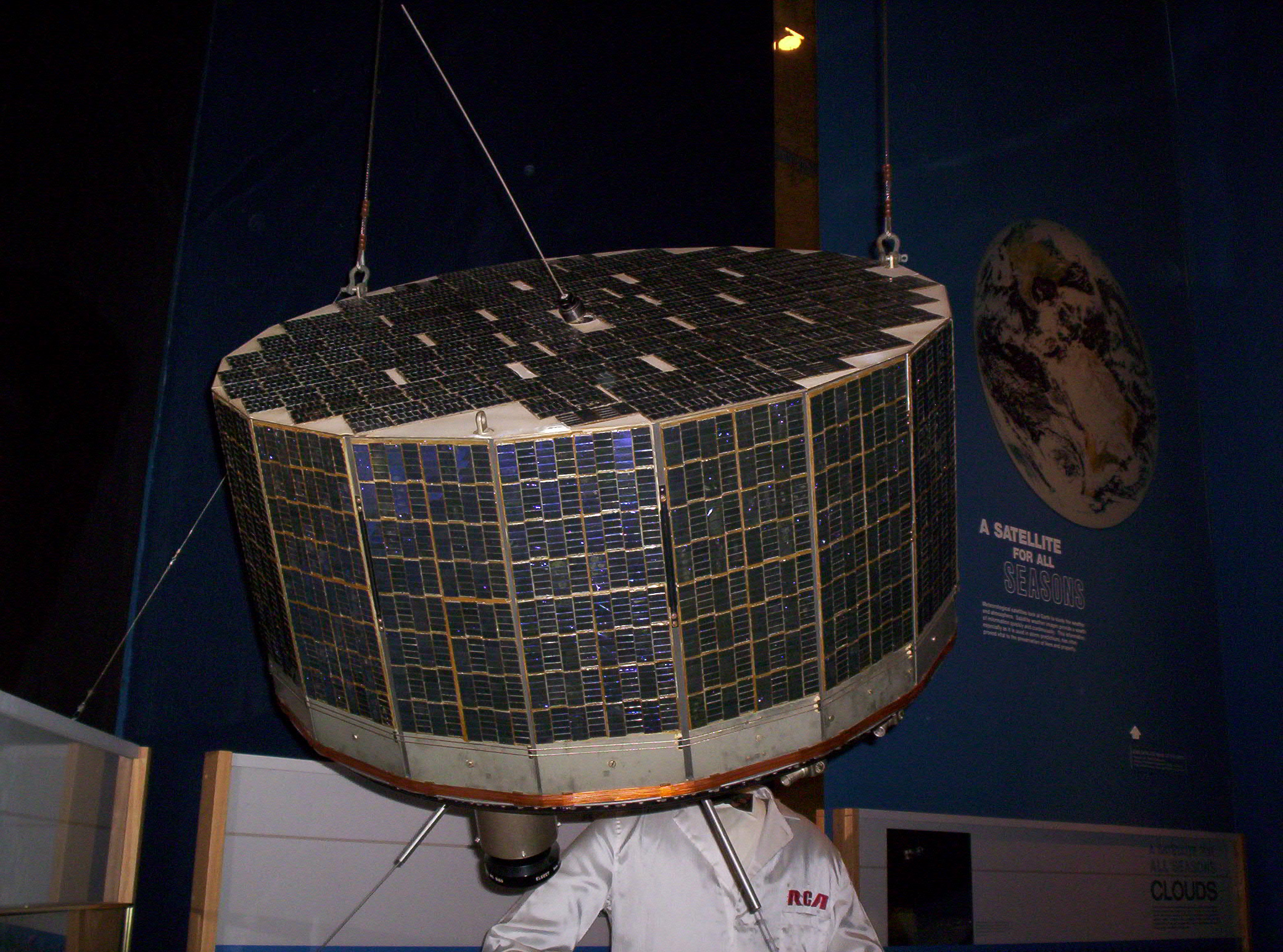
TIROS-1 Satellite displayed at National Air and Space Museum in Washington

Prior to the development of the current Earth Observing System (EOS), the foundations for this program were laid in the early 1960s and 1970s. TIROS-1, the very first full-scale, low Earth orbit weather satellite. The primary objective of TIROS-1 was to explore television infrared observation as a method of monitoring and studying the surface of Earth. Critical to the development of the satellites currently in use, TIROS-1 was a program that allowed NASA to use experimental instruments and data collection methods to study meteorology worldwide. Crucially, this new information gathered by TIROS-1 would allow meteorologists and scientists to observe large-scale weather events. In doing so, they would be able to answer questions such as "should we evacuate the coast because of the hurricane?". Following TIROS, the experimental Applications Technology Satellite (ATS) program was developed. The main objective of these satellites were weather predictions and the study of the environment of space. Significantly, this program focused on launching satellites to orbit geosynchronously and evaluate the effectiveness of this orbit pattern in observing the Earth. ATS-3, the longest-lasting mission, saw a life span of over 20 years. It was the first satellite to capture colour images from space and acted significantly as a medium of communications.

After the success of TIROS-1 and ATS-3, NASA in conjunction with United States Geological Survey (USGS), progressed forward in Earth observation through a series of Landsat satellites launched throughout the 1970s and 1980s. The Nimbus 5 satellite launched in 1972 used passive microwave imaging; a highly successful method to observe changes in sea ice cover. Observation was furthered by succeeding missions such as Nimbus 7, fitted with a coastal zone colour scanner (CZCS) for detailing colour changes in the Earth's oceans, and a Total Ozone Mapping Spectrometer (TOMS) to measure solar irradiance and the reflected radiance from the Earth's atmosphere. The early satellites of these programs have paved the way for much of the EOS program today. The TIROS satellites were extremely important in the testing and development of not only the Earth observing instruments such as spectrometers, but much was also learnt from the various sensors used in order to maintain these satellites in orbit for sustainable periods of time. Sensors such as horizons sensors were tested on these early satellites and have been adapted to produce more advanced methods of observation and operating configurations.

== Operation and technology - Logistics ==
According to NASA's Earth Observing System mission page, there are over 30 missions that remain active. As an evolving program, the EOS can collect a variety of data through various instruments that have been developed. Below outlines various sensors on different EOS missions and the data they collect.
Mission / Satellites	Technology	Uses
Landsat Program
Landsat 5-8	Operational Land Imager (OLI)	Developed by Ball Aerospace & Technologies Corporation, the OLI is a crucial aspect of modern LandSat vehicles. Using 7000 sensors per band (Spectrum band), the OLI on NASA's most recent LandSat (LANDSAT 8) Satellite, will image/view the entire earth every 16 days.
Landsat 5-8	Enhanced Thematic Mapper + (ETM+)	Used in conjunction with OLI, the ETM + images the Earth in 30m Pixels. To ensure quality, each scan has a correction due to Scan-Line correcting.
A-Train Program
CloudSat	Cloud Profiling Radar (CPR)	Operates at 96 GHz. Crucially, the CPR is used to detail cloud-sized particles. These can be in the form of snow, cloud ice, water and light rains.
CALIPSO	Lidar	Similarly to Radar, Lidar measures by the time a light (Laser) source takes to return to the sensor. CALIPSO, fitted with Lidar Level 2, mainly focused with measuring condensable vapours such as water and nitric acid. Collects Polar Stratific cloud data.
AURA	Microwave Limb Sounder (MLS)	Used to measure microwave emissions (Thermal) that naturally occurs. The name Limb refers to the "edge" of Earth's atmosphere. This data collected includes atmospheric gas profiles and atmospheric temperature and pressure.
AURA	Tropospheric Emission Spectrometer (TES)	TES is an infrared sensor aboard AURA used to investigate the troposphere of Earth's Atmosphere. Crucially, it helps scientists understand the impact of Carbon dioxide in the atmosphere and the OZONE layer and its changes.
AQUA	Advanced Microwave Scanning Radiometer (AMSR-E)	AMSR-E, a critical instrument used to measure physical properties occurring on Earth. Rain precipitation, various sea and land temperatures, snow and ice cover, and water vapour from the ocean are just some properties that are measured using microwave scanning radiometer. Detecting microwave emissions, the data is evaluated to determine various characteristics about each geophysical property.
AQUA	Moderate Resolution Imaging Spectroradiometer (MODIS)	Measuring in 36 different spectral bands, the MODIS system is critical on AQUA. Used to increase understanding of global properties and dynamics, MODIS helps Scientists to predict changes on Land, water and lower atmosphere.

== Data collection and uses ==
Since the inception of the program, the aim overall has remained the same: "monitor and understand key components of the climate system and their interactions through long-term global observations." Through the use of various programs such as LandSat and the A-Train programs, scientists are gaining a greater understanding of Earth and its changes. Currently, the data collected by the satellites in EOS is digitised and collated by the Earth Observing System Data and Information System. Scientists then use this data to predict weather events, and more recently to predict the effects of climate change for treaties such as Paris Climate agreements, with data mainly being collected by EOS and then analysed.

== Intergovernmental agencies and partnerships ==
In a broader sense of Earth observing and all missions that impact EOS, there have been a variety of intergovernmental partnerships and international partnerships that have helped fund, research and develop the complex array of satellites and spacecraft that make the Earth Observing System successful in its role. In total, intergovernmental partnerships account for almost 37% of all missions while 27% of the missions also involve international partnerships with other countries and international companies.

As of 2022, there have been nine LandSat satellites with LandSat 7, 8, and 9 orbiting the Earth. The LandSat program has involved many organisations since its inception, particularly the United States Geological Survey (USGS). Other intergovernmental agencies that have been a part of the Earth Observing program include the Environmental Science Services Administration (ESSA), US Department of Defence (USDOD), United States Department of Energy (USDOE) and the US National Oceanic and Atmospheric Administration (NOAA). These intergovernmental agencies cooperating allow for greater funding for the program along with collaboration of government resources from various agencies. Often these partnerships begin with another governmental agency wanting a specific instrument as a part of a payload included on a mission.

Similarly, international partnerships with countries have either resulted from a specific payload (instrument) accompanying an existing mission that NASA has developed or NASA collaborating and requiring the use of facilities of another Space agency such as the European Space Agency. A partnership like this was observed in 2000 when the ERS-1 satellite was launched from the Guiana Space Centre; a spaceport in French Guiana, South America. International agencies that have assisted or collaborated with NASA include CONAE (Argentinian Space Agency), CNES (French Space Agency), DLR (German Aerospace Centre), the state space federation Roscosmos of the Russian Federation, and JAXA (Japanese Space Agency; previously NASDA).

Over the program's life, there have also been various corporate and organisational partnerships with companies both based in America and internationally. In 2002, the SeaWIFS missions saw a collaboration with GEOeye, an American satellite imaging company. Similarly, organisations such as the International Council for Science (ICSU), International standards Organisation (IOS), World Data System (WDS) and the committee on Earth Observing Satellites (CEOS) have been involved in the planning, data collection, and data analysis of missions. As mentioned, funding, instrumental additions and over assistance in coordination and data analysis are all benefits of these partnerships.

== Mission list with launch dates ==
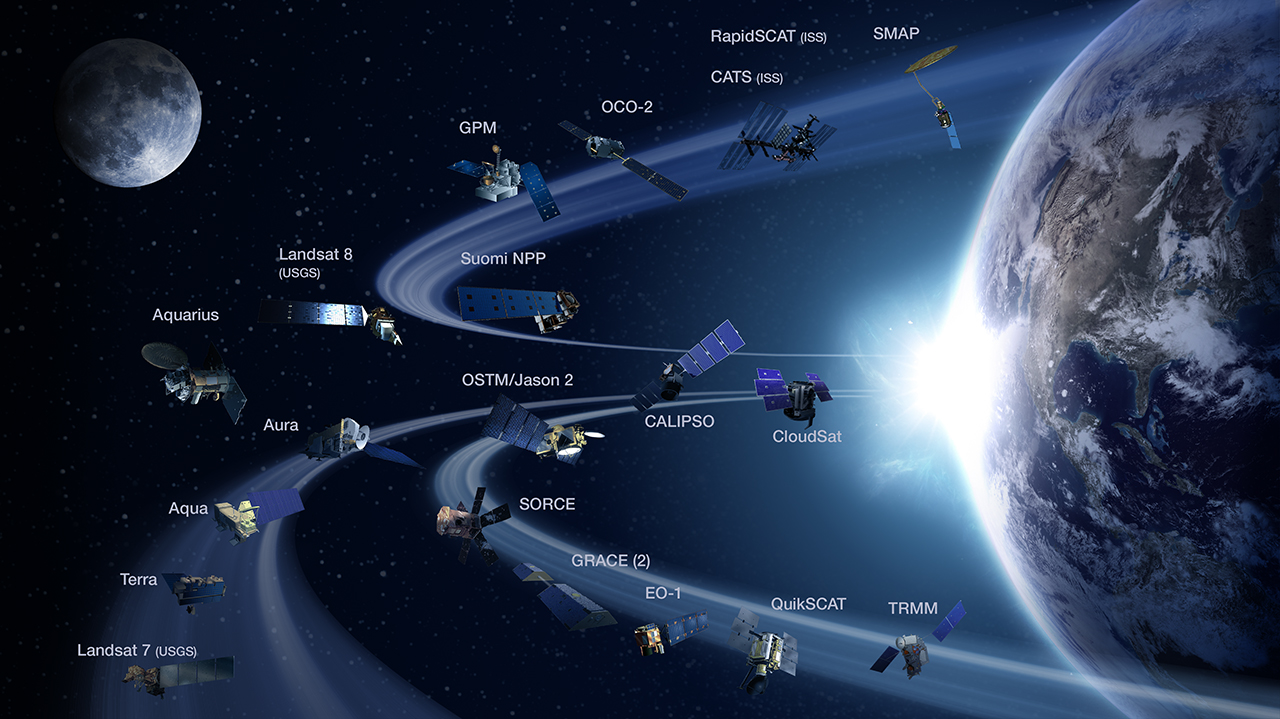
NASA Earth Science Division Operating Missions as of 2 February 2015

This animation shows the orbits of NASA's 2011 fleet of Earth remote sensing observatories

Active mission	Completed mission

Satellite	Launch date	Designed mission duration	Completion date	Launch site	Agency	Mission description
ACRIMSAT	20 December 1999		30 July 2014	Vandenberg	NASA	Study Total Solar Irradiance
ADEOS I	17 August 1996		30 June 1997	Tanegashima	NASA / NASDA	Study wind scattering and map the ozone layer
ADEOS II (Midori II)	14 December 2002		24 October 2003	Tanegashima	JAXA / NASA	Monitor the water and energy cycle as a part of the global climate system
ATS-3	7 December 1966	3 years	1 December 1978	Cape Canaveral	NASA	Weather observation
ATLAS-1	24 March 1992		2 April 1992	Cape Canaveral	NASA	Unravel man's impact on the environment
CHAMP	15 July 2000	5 years	19 September 2010	Plesetsk 132/1	GFZ	Atmospheric and ionospheric research
CRRES	25 July 1990	3 years	12 October 1991	Cape Canaveral	NASA	Investigate fields, plasmas, and energetic particles inside the magnetosphere
DE 1 and DE 2	3 August 1981		28 February 1991 and 19 February 1983	Vandenberg	NASA	Investigate the interactions between plasmas in the magnetosphere and those in the ionosphere
ERBS	5 October 1984	2 years	14 October 2005	Cape Canaveral	NASA	Study the Earth's radiation budget and stratospheric aerosol and gases
ESSA program	1966–1969			Cape Canaveral	ESSA / NASA	Provide cloud-cover photography
ERS-1	17 July 1991		March 2000	Kourou	ESA	Measure wind speed and direction and ocean wave parameters
SeaWiFS	1 August 1997	1 August 2002	11 December 2010	Vandenberg	GeoEye / NASA	Provide quantitative data on global ocean bio-optical properties
TRMM	27 November 1997	27 November 2000	9 April 2015	Tanegashima	NASA / JAXA	Monitor and study tropical rainfall
Landsat 7	15 April 1999		27 September 2021	Vandenberg	NASA	Supply the world with global land surface images
QuikSCAT	19 June 1999	19 June 2002	19 November 2009	Vandenberg	NASA / JPL	Acquire global radar cross-sections and near-surface vector winds
Terra (EOS-AM)	18 December 1999	18 December 2005	Active	Vandenberg	NASA	Provide global data on the state of the atmosphere, land, and oceans
NMP/EO-1	21 November 2000		30 March 2017	Vandenberg	NASA	Demonstrate new technologies and strategies for improved Earth observations
Jason 1	7 December 2001		1 July 2013	Vandenberg	NASA / CNES	Provide information on ocean surface current velocity and heights
Meteor 3M-1/Sage III	10 December 2001		6 March 2006	Baikonur	Roscosmos	Provide accurate, long-term measurements of ozone, aerosols, water vapor, and other key parameters of Earth's atmosphere
GRACE	17 March 2002		27 October 2017	Plesetsk Cosmodrome	NASA / DLR	Measure Earth's mean and time-variable gravity field
Aqua	4 May 2002	4 May 2008	Active	Vandenberg	NASA	Collect water information in the Earth system
ICESat	12 January 2003		14 August 2010	Vandenberg	NASA	Measuring ice sheet mass balance, cloud and aerosol heights, and land topography and vegetation characteristics
SORCE	25 January 2003		25 February 2020	Cape Canaveral	NASA	Improve understanding of the Sun
Aura	15 July 2004	15 July 2010	Active	Vandenberg	NASA	Investigate questions about ozone trends, air-quality changes and their linkage to climate change
CloudSat	28 April 2006	28 April 2009	Active	Vandenberg	NASA	Provide the first direct, global survey of the vertical structure and overlap of cloud systems and their liquid and ice-water contents
CALIPSO	28 April 2006		Active	Vandenberg	NASA / CNES	Improve understanding of the role aerosols and clouds play in regulating the Earth's climate
SMAP	31 January 2015	31 May 2018	Active	Vandenberg	NASA	Measure surface soil moisture and freeze-thaw state
OCO-2	2 July 2014	2 July 2019	Active	Vandenberg	NASA	Provide space-based global measurements of atmospheric carbon dioxide
Aquarius	10 June 2011	3 years	17 June 2015	Vandenberg	NASA / CONAE	Map the spatial and temporal variations of sea surface salinity
Landsat 8	11 February 2013	11 February 2018	Active	Vandenberg	NASA / USGS	Supply the world with global land surface images
ICESat-2	15 September 2018	3 years	Active	Vandenberg	NASA	Measuring ice sheet mass balance, cloud and aerosol heights, and land topography and vegetation characteristics
Landsat 9	27 September 2021	5 years	Active	Vandenberg	NASA / USGS	Global land surface images, continuation of the Landsat program

== Future missions ==
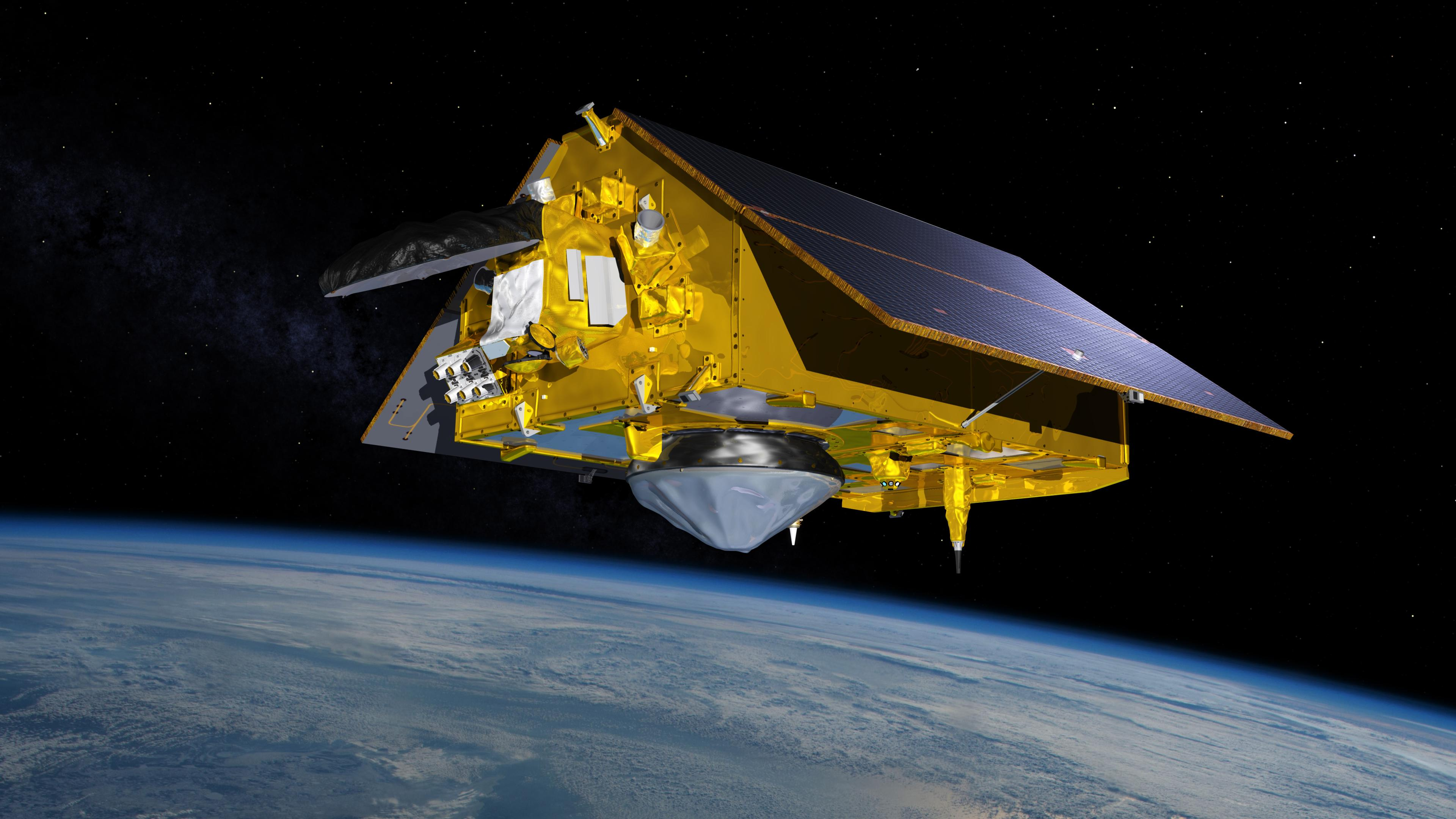
Illustration of Sentinel 6B

=== Sentinel 6B ===
As the Earth Observing System becomes more crucial in studying the Earth's climate and changes, the program will continue to evolve. NASA along with other government agencies such as the European Space Agency and NASDA (Japan), have planned many future missions. Sentinel 6B is one such mission with the aim of continued water and ocean observations. A key objective of the sentinel missions is to monitor sea level rise, a primary indicator of climate change and global warming. As Paris Agreement policy and more countries aim for a carbon neutral world, the data collected by Sentinel missions will assist in the continued understanding of the Earth's changing climate. It is also expected that one of the sentinel satellites will test a new experiment with regards to weather prediction. As a part of its payload, it will use Global Navigation Satellite System Radio Occultation (GNSS-RO), a method to detail changes and information of different layers in the atmosphere.

=== JPSS-3 and 4 ===
JPSS or Joint Polar Satellite systems are expected to launch in 2027. This project will be an intergovernmental collaboration between NASA and National Oceanic and Atmospheric Administration (NOAA) and will observe a new generation of Polar Orbiting environmental satellites. Crucially, these polar orbiting satellites are non-geosynchronous meaning these two satellites will have an inclination angle of close to 90 degrees to the equator. Crucially this project is continuing and is the third and fourth satellite in the JPSS series. The payload for this type of satellite will include Visible Infrared imaging Radiometer, Advanced Technology Microwave Sounder and Ozone Mapping and Profiler Suite. The data collected by these variety of instruments will included numerical weather prediction to be used for modelling and forecast prediction.

=== EVM-3 INCUS ===
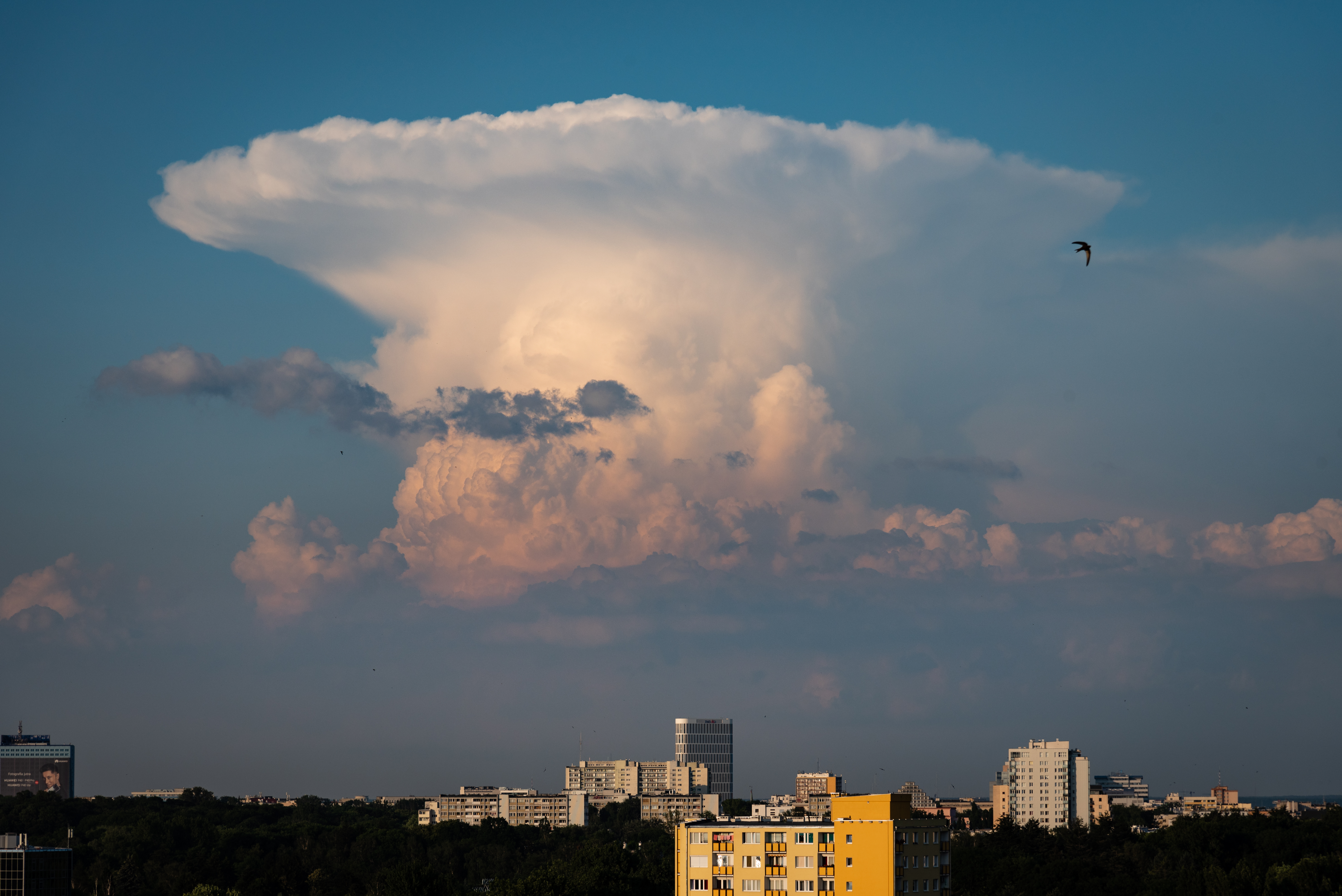
Cumuionimbus INCUS clouds over Poland. The aim of EVM-3 INCUS is to investigate the formation of these clouds and thunderstorms often associated.

A branch of the Earth Venture Missions, the Investigation of Convective Updrafts missions is planned to have three small satellites. The three satellites will orbit in tight coordination and will have the aim of understanding the formation of convective storms and heavy precipitation. It aims to know not only how, but know exactly where and when they will form. Although still in planning and development stages, the first of the three satellites in EVM-3 in 2027. After deliberation between 12 proposals of EVM in 2021, the INCUS mission was selected after a review by panellists. NASA's Earth Science Director Karen St. Germain stated, "In a changing climate, more accurate information about how storms develop and intensify can help improve weather models and our ability to predict risk of extreme weather." As the effects of climate change are ever more increasing with increasing sea level temperatures globally, it is predicted that storms will have a greater intensity and occur more often. This is a result of increased water vapour moving upwards creating the convection currents. INCUS will help scientist understand these currents and help predict the likelihood and location of major storms when fully operational.

== See also ==
- A-train (satellite constellation)
- Atmospheric Chemistry Observational Databases
- Earth observation satellite
- Earth Observing System Data and Information System (EOSDIS) – provides end-to-end capabilities for managing NASA's Earth science data
- Fire Information for Resource Management System (FIRMS) – provides information on active fire locations as part of NASA's Earth Science Data Systems program
- Geoinformatics
- List of Earth observation satellites
