= Adeos =

Adeos may refer to:

== Space ==
- ADEOS I, a Japanese satellite launched in 1996
- ADEOS II, a Japanese satellite launched in 2002
