= Parasol (satellite) =

French Earth observation satellite

- Mission type: Earth Observation
- COSPAR ID: 2004-049G
- SATCAT no.: 28498
- Website: https://parasol.cnes.fr/en/PARASOL/index.htm
- Mission duration: 9 years

Spacecraft properties
- Launch mass: 120 kg
- Dry mass: 115 kg
- Power: 180 watts

Expedition
- Began: UTC

Start of mission
- Launch date: December 18, 2004
- Rocket: Ariana-5G+
- Launch site: Kourou, French Guiana
- Contractor: b

End of mission
- Deactivated: December 18, 2013

Orbital parameters
- Reference system: Geocentric
- Regime: Sun-synchronous
- Altitude: 705 km
- Inclination: 98.21°

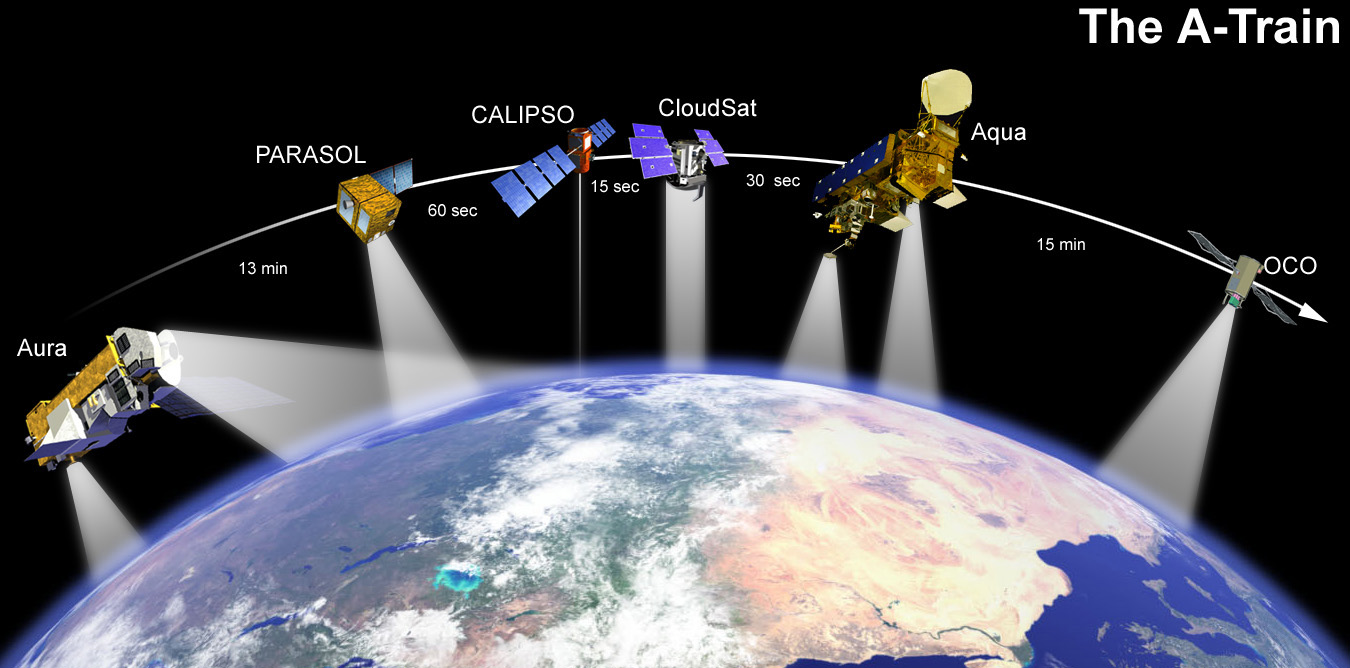
Satellites in A Train, prior to 2 December 2009: PARASOL is the second, from left

PARASOL (Polarization & Anisotropy of Reflectances for Atmospheric Sciences coupled with Observations from a Lidar) was a French-built Earth observing research satellite. It carried an instrument called POLDER, which studied the radiative and microphysical properties of clouds and aerosols.

== History ==
PARASOL was launched from the French spaceport in Kourou, French Guiana on December 18, 2004, by an Ariane 5 G+.

It flew in formation in the "A Train" constellation with several other satellites (Aqua, CALIPSO, CloudSat and Aura). These satellites had, for the first time ever, combined a full suite of instruments for observing clouds and aerosols, from passive radiometers to active lidar and radar sounders.

On 2 December 2009, PARASOL was maneuvered out of the A-Train, dropping some 4 km below the other satellites by early January 2010.

The satellite's mission was formally ended exactly 9 years after launch on December 18, 2013.
