= Earth Observation Center =

Observation facility of JAXA

Coordinates: 36°00′11″N 139°20′57″E

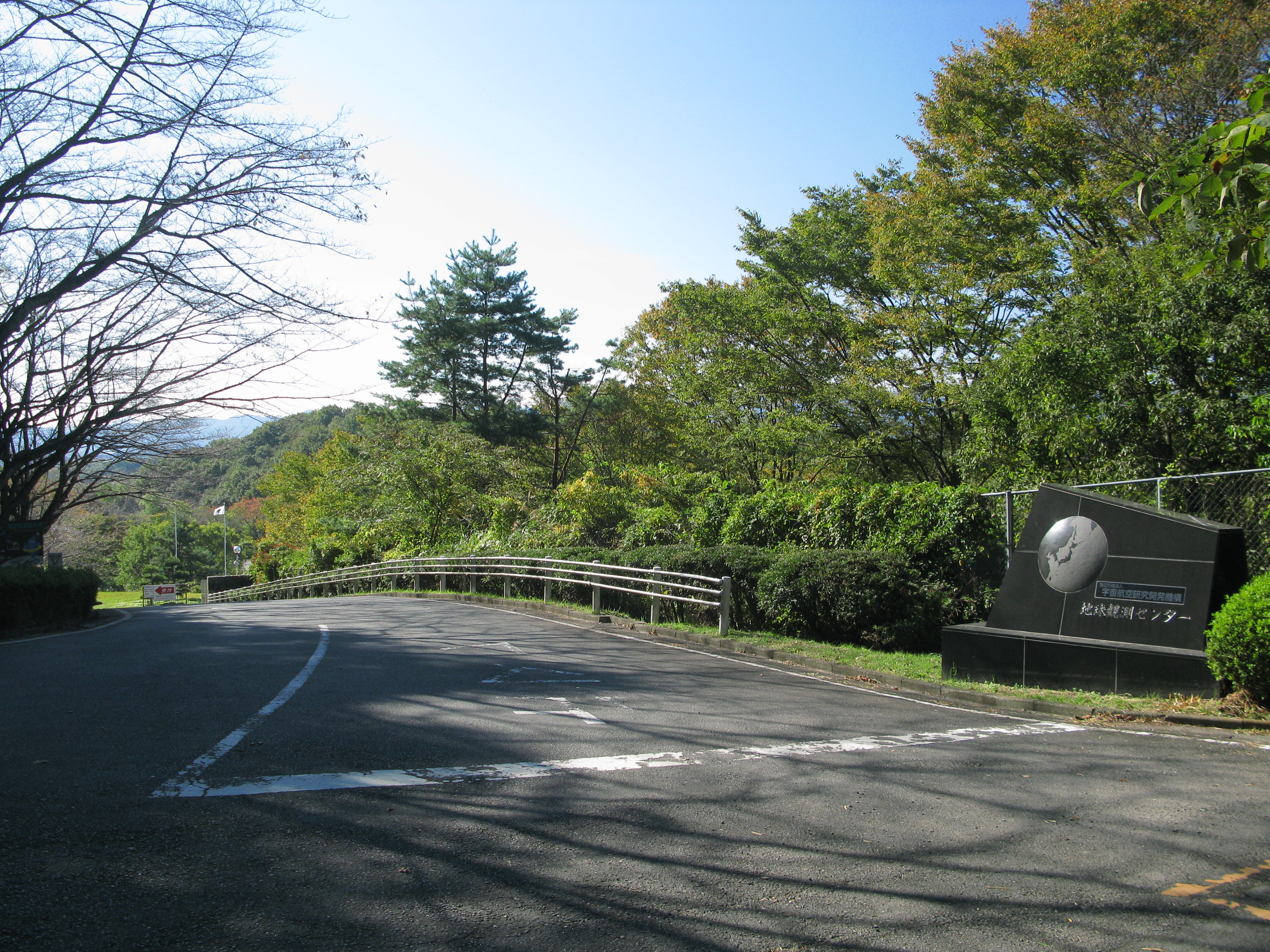
Entrance to the Earth Observation Center (November 2012)

The Earth Observation Center is a Japanese Aerospace Exploration Agency (JAXA) aeronautical research facility located in Hatoyama, Saitama, Japan. It utilizes remote sensing technologies such as satellites to study Earth's environment from outer space. The research done by this center has a substantial impact on the study of the Earth's environmental phenomena, such as global warming.

== Background ==
The Earth Observation Center was established in Hatoyama, Saitama in October 1978 to process data from many satellites in orbit. It was created as a part of the National Space Development Agency of Japan (NASDA) Office of Earth Observation Systems. After NASDA merged its operations into JAXA in 2003, the EOC was also absorbed by JAXA. The EOC still exists as an integral component to JAXA's operations in the satellite imagery sector.

== Function ==
The primary function of the EOC is to collect, process, and archive imaging data from satellites in orbit. The EOC then sends the processed data to the Remote Sensing Technology Center of Japan (RESTEC), which is a center that receives this data and processes it for distribution to researchers and the public. This information is also stored on magnetic tape data storage in the EOC's archives and is converted into simple images which are available to the scientific community (laboratories, universities, governments) as well as to the general public through DVD's. The distribution of this data is used to monitor for environmental disasters as well as educate the world about environmental issues. The ultimate goal of the EOC is to describe Japan's future climate change as well as build upon the remote sensing technologies.

== Facility ==
The Earth Observation Center covers an area of 115,000 m^{2} - spread among a main building and two supplemental buildings. The EOC has many instruments used for high-resolution satellite imagery and the development of sensors for remote sensing satellites. These instruments include four parabolic antenna - two 10 meters, one 11.5 meters, one 13 meters in diameter - spread throughout the EOC campus which each channel data to high-density digital tape recorders for magnetic tape data storage. The EOC can handle 30 camera photos and 30 images from the Synthetic Aperture Radar, a radar that captures images of an object based on the object's relative motion, of the satellite JERS-1.

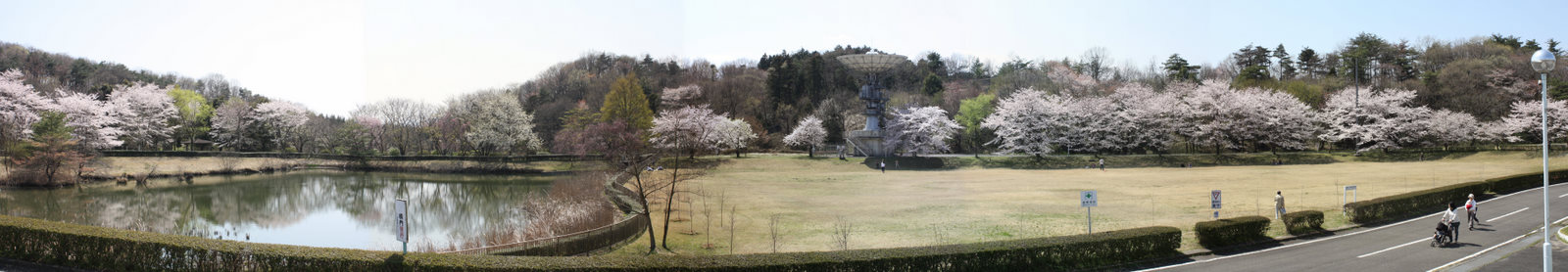
The Earth Observation Center is known for cherry blossoms in spring (7 April 2009).

== Contributions ==
The EOC has had an impact on the study of contemporary environmental phenomena of Earth including El Niño, Greenhouse Gases, and the cryosphere as well as environmental disasters such as fires, typhoons, and floods.

=== Environmental Analysis ===
==== Greenhouse Gases ====
One of the facets of the environment the EOC is known for analyzing is the study of greenhouse gases in the atmosphere.

The EOC conducted a three-month study for the monitoring of greenhouse gases lasting from January 2009 to March 2009 with the Izuki satellite. The Izuki determined the amount of visible light absorbed by the different levels of Earth's atmosphere. The EOC translated this light absorption data into a chart and determined the change in atmospheric greenhouse gas concentration. The EOC will continue to use this satellite to gather light data in order to determine if the amount of atmospheric greenhouse gas is increasing (a root of global warming).

==== Cryosphere ====
Most of the EOC's study on Earth's cryosphere deals with the ice levels in the world, namely the Arctic and Antarctic sea ice levels.

The facility has conducted a study on Earth's water cycle through a quantitative analysis of Arctic sea ice shrinkage. The Aqua and Shizuku satellites compiled data used by the EOC to quantify the concentration of Arctic sea ice. The EOC determined how much ice melts throughout the course of a year and how global warming has affected the Arctic ice cap.

=== Disaster Analysis ===
==== Fires ====
The EOC has been involved in the analysis of fires - not just in Japan, but all across the Pacific including the United States.

Following the Southern California wildfires of October 2007, the EOC utilized the moisture, temperature, and humidity data of Southern California from the Aqua satellite in order to determine the cause of the fires. The analysis of the data done by the EOC showed that the soil moisture content dropped to very low levels on October 19. The analysis also showed that during the fires, the dry Santa Ana winds blew through Southern California and fueled the raging fires which lasted until early November.

==== Floods ====
The EOC also performs analysis on the effect flooding has in regions such as Southeast Asia.

During the flood in Thailand from July to December 2011, the EOC gathered images from the satellites Daichi and Izuki and created a graphic that illustrated the withdrawal of flood water from Thailand back into the Gulf of Thailand. This graphic shows that most of the flood water receded during the month of December - effectively ending the Thailand flood.

== Satellites ==
Many satellites commissioned by JAXA and aeronautical institutions rest of the world share images and data with the EOC. Some of these satellites include:

- Advanced Earth Observing Satellite (ADEOS) was launched by NASDA in August 1996 but was put out-of-order in July 1997 due to structural damage.

- Advanced Earth Observation Satellite-II (ADEOS-II) was launched by NASDA in December 2002 but failed due to a faulty solar panel in October 2003.

- Advanced Land Observing Satellite (ALOS) is a satellite launched by JAXA in January 2006. It is used to map terrain in Asia and the Pacific.

- Earth Observing System-PM1 (AQUA) is a multi-national satellite commissioned by America's NASA in May 2002.

- European Remote Sensing Satellite (ERS) was the ESA's first Earth-observing satellite and was launched in July 1991.

- Greenhouse Gases Observing Satellite (GOSAT), also known as Ibuki, is a satellite launched by JAXA in January 2009 and is used to monitor concentration levels of greenhouse gases such as carbon monoxide and methane.

- Japanese Earth Resources Satellite-1 (JERS-1) was a satellite commissioned by JAXA in 1992 and operated until 1998.

- Land Satellite (LANDSAT) series from the Landsat program is a set of seven satellites commissioned by America's NOAA between 1972 and 1999. These satellites are designed to capture images of Earth.

- Marine Observation Satellite (MOS) was Japan's first observation satellite, it has been inactive since November 1995.

- Satellite Probatoire d'Observation de la Terre (SPOT) was initialized by and is mostly used by the French organization CNES but is also utilized by the EOC.

- Shizuku (satellite) (GCOM-W1) is a satellite launched in May 2012 and is used to observe Earth's water cycle.

- Tropical Rainfall Measuring Mission (TRMM) satellite is part of the joint mission between JAXA and NASA designed to monitor and study rainfall.
