= Polder (disambiguation) =

Polder is a low-lying tract of land enclosed by embankments known as dikes, that forms an artificial hydrological entity.

Polder may also refer to:

- POLDER, an environmental satellite radiometer

== People with the surname ==
- Dirk Polder (1919–2001), Dutch physicist
- Tessa Polder (born 1997), Dutch volleyball player

== See also ==
- Polder Model, the Dutch version of consensus policy in economics
