= POLDER =

POLDER 1
- Mission type: Earth observation
- Operator: CNES
- Website: CNES Page

Spacecraft properties
- Launch mass: ~30 kg (66 lb)
- Power: 30W

Start of mission
- Launch date: 07:00, August 17, 1996
- Rocket: H-II (POLDER 1)
- Launch site: Tanegashima Space Center

Main push broom scanner
- Type: Telecentric lens
- Focal length: 3.57 mm (0.141 in)
- Wavelengths: 443 and 910 nm FWHM
- Resolution: 242x548 pixels

Transponders
- Band: Formed broad beam pattern UHF antenna
- TWTA power: >5W
- EIRP: 27.1 dBm

POLDER 2
- Mission type: Earth observation
- Operator: CNES
- Website: CNES Page

Spacecraft properties
- Launch mass: ~30 kg (66 lb)
- Power: 30W

Start of mission
- Launch date: 07:00, December 14, 2002
- Rocket: H-IIA (POLDER 1)
- Launch site: Tanegashima Space Center

Main push broom scanner
- Type: Telecentric lens
- Focal length: 3.57 mm (0.141 in)
- Wavelengths: 443 and 910 nm FWHM
- Resolution: 242x548 pixels

Transponders
- Band: Formed broad beam pattern UHF antenna
- TWTA power: >5W
- EIRP: 27.1 dBm

POLDER 3
- Mission type: Earth observation
- Operator: CNES
- Website: CNES Page

Spacecraft properties
- Launch mass: ~30 kg (66 lb)
- Power: 30W

Start of mission
- Launch date: 07:00, December 18, 2004
- Rocket: Ariane 5G
- Launch site: Guiana Space Centre

Main push broom scanner
- Type: Telecentric lens
- Focal length: 3.57 mm (0.141 in)
- Wavelengths: 443 and 910 nm FWHM
- Resolution: 242x548 pixels

Transponders
- Band: Formed broad beam pattern UHF antenna
- TWTA power: >5W
- EIRP: 27.1 dBm

POLDER (POLarization and Directionality of the Earth's Reflectances) is a passive optical imaging radiometer and polarimeter instrument developed by the French space agency CNES.

== Description ==
The device was designed to observe solar radiation reflected by Earth's atmosphere, including studies of tropospheric aerosols, sea surface reflectance, bidirectional reflectance distribution function of land surfaces, and the Earth Radiation Budget.

=== Specifications ===
POLDER has a mass of approximately 30 kilograms (66 lb), and has a power consumption of 77 W in imaging mode (with a mean consumption of 29 W).

==== Imaging ====
POLDER utilizes a push broom scanner. The device's optical system uses a telecentric lens and a charge-coupled device matrix with a resolution of 242x548 pixels. The focal length is 3.57 millimetres (0.141 in) with a focal ratio of 4.6. The field of view ranges from ±43° to ±57°, depending on the tracking method.

==== Spectral characteristics ====
The device scans between 443 and 910 nm FWHM, depending on the objective of the measurement. The shorter wavelengths (443–565 nm) typically measure ocean color, whereas the longer wavelengths (670–910 nm) are used to study vegetation and water vapor content.

==== Data transfer ====
It transmits data on 465.9875 MHz at bit rate of 200 bit/s, and receives on 401.65 MHz at 400 bit/s. The data rate is 880 kbit/s at a quantization level of 12 bits.

== Missions ==
POLDER was first launched as a passenger instrument aboard ADEOS I on 17 August 1996. The mission ended on 30 June 1997 when communication from the host satellite failed. POLDER 2 was launched in December 2002 aboard ADEOS II. The second mission ended prematurely after 10 months when the satellite's solar panel malfunctioned. A third generation instrument was launched on board the French PARASOL microsatellite. The satellite was maneuvered out of the A-train on 2 December 2009 and permanently shut down on 18 December 2013.

== Sources ==
- Kramer, Herbert J (2002), Observation of the Earth and Its Environment: Survey of Missions and Sensors, Berlin, Germany: Springer Science+Business Media, ISBN 3-540-42388-5
- Krebs, Gunter (2010), ADEOS 1 (Midori 1), Germany: Gunter's Space Page
- Satellite News Digest (2006), Midori I (ADEOS I), Luebeck, Germany: Sat-ND, archived from the original on 5 October 2011
- Satellite News Digest (2003), Midori II (ADEOS II), Luebeck, Germany: Sat-ND, archived from the original on 5 October 2011
