= CloudSat =

NASA Earth observation satellite

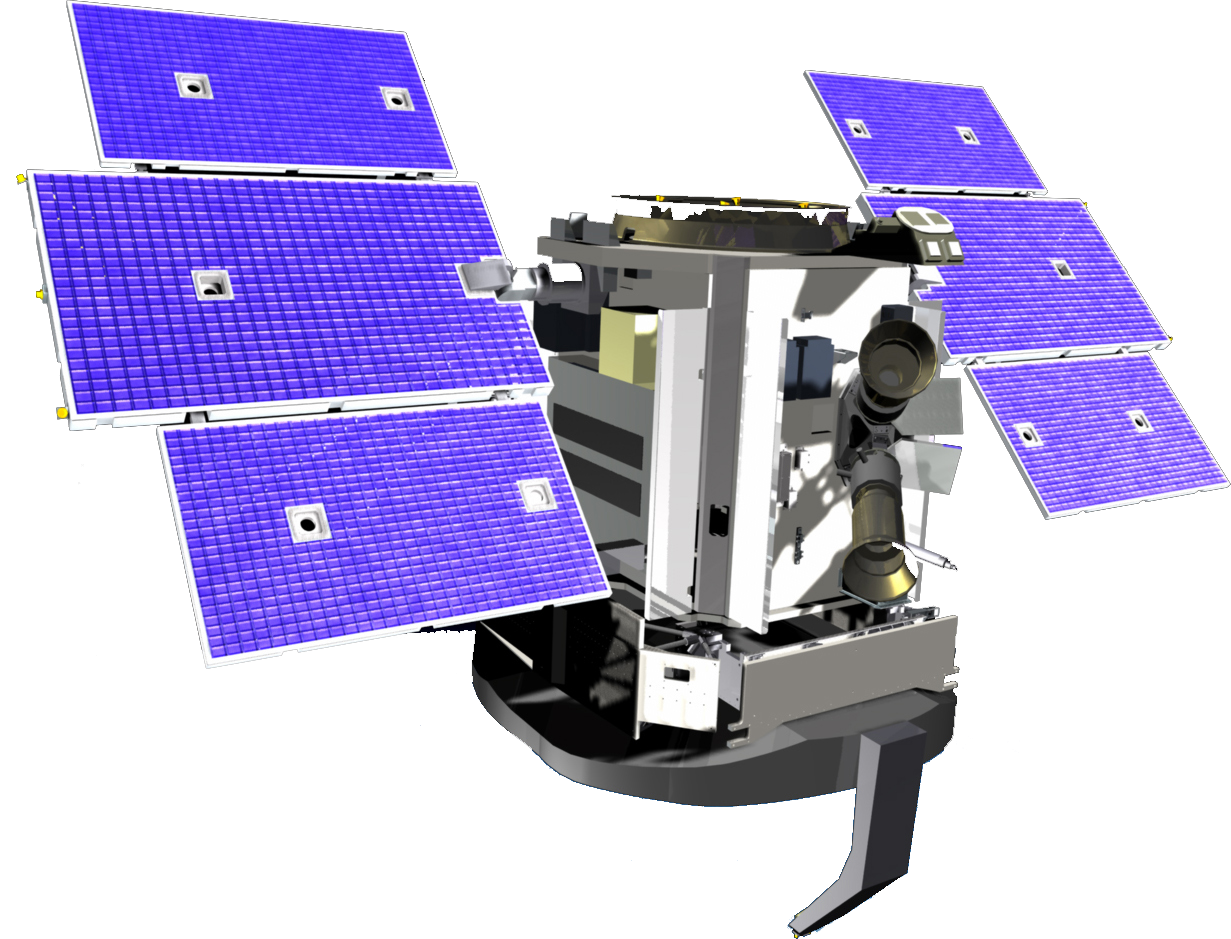
- Artist's Concept of CloudSat
- Mission type: Atmospheric research
- Operator: NASA
- COSPAR ID: 2006-016A
- SATCAT no.: 29107
- Website: CloudSat home page
- Mission duration: Planned: 22 months Final: 17 years, 11 months, 25 days

Spacecraft properties
- Bus: BCP-2000
- Manufacturer: Ball Aerospace
- Launch mass: 700 kg (1,543 lb)
- Dimensions: 2.54 × 2.03 × 2.29 m (8.3 × 6.7 × 7.5 ft) (H × L × W)

Start of mission
- Launch date: April 28, 2006, 10:02:16 UTC
- Rocket: Delta II 7420-10C
- Launch site: Vandenberg, SLC-2W

End of mission
- Disposal: Passivated
- Deactivated: December 15, 2023, 2:24:30 UTC
- Last contact: 23 May 2024 (Decommissioned)

Orbital parameters
- Reference system: Geocentric
- Regime: LEO
- Semi-major axis: 7,080.59 km (4,399.67 mi)
- Eccentricity: 0.0000824
- Perigee altitude: 709 km (441 mi)
- Apogee altitude: 710 km (440 mi)
- Inclination: 98.23 degrees
- Period: 98.83 minutes
- RAAN: 330.82 degrees
- Argument of perigee: 91.62 degrees
- Mean anomaly: 14.57 degrees
- Mean motion: 14.57
- Epoch: 25 January 2015, 03:10:38 UTC
- Revolution no.: 46,515

CloudSat is a Passivated NASA Earth observation satellite, which was launched on a Delta II rocket on April 28, 2006, and is awaiting disposal. It used radar to measure the altitude and properties of clouds, adding to the information on the relationship between clouds and climate to help resolve questions about global warming.

It operated in daytime-only operations from 2011 to 2023 due to battery malfunction, requiring sunlight to power the radar. On December 15, 2023, the Cloud Profiling Radar was deactivated for the final time, ending the data collection portion of the mission.

The mission was selected under NASA's Earth System Science Pathfinder program in 1999. Ball Aerospace & Technologies Corp. in Boulder, Colorado, designed and built the spacecraft.

CloudSat's primary mission was scheduled to continue for 22 months to allow more than one seasonal cycle to be observed.

== Instrument ==
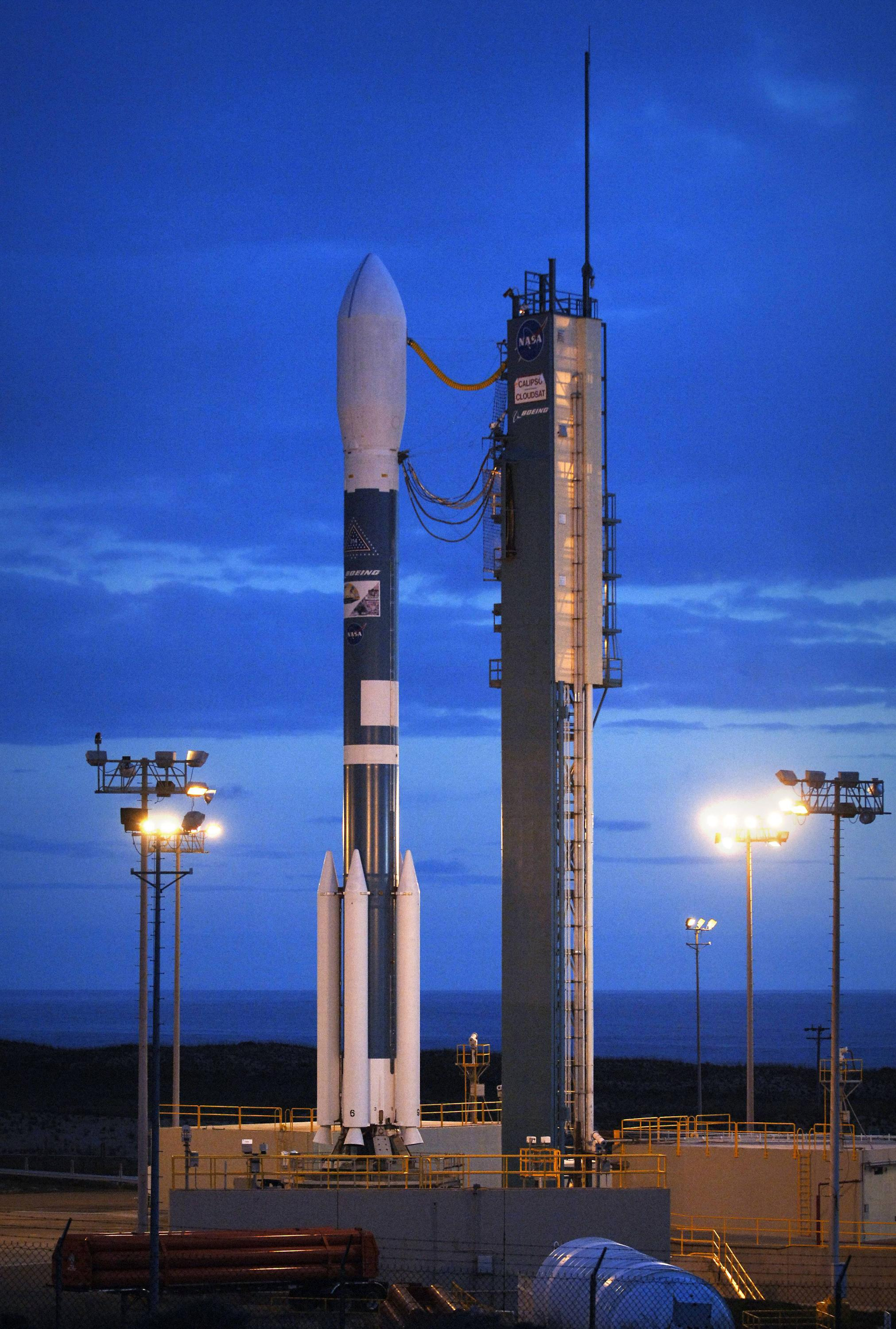
The Delta II rocket with CloudSat and CALIPSO on Launch Pad SLC-2W, VAFB.

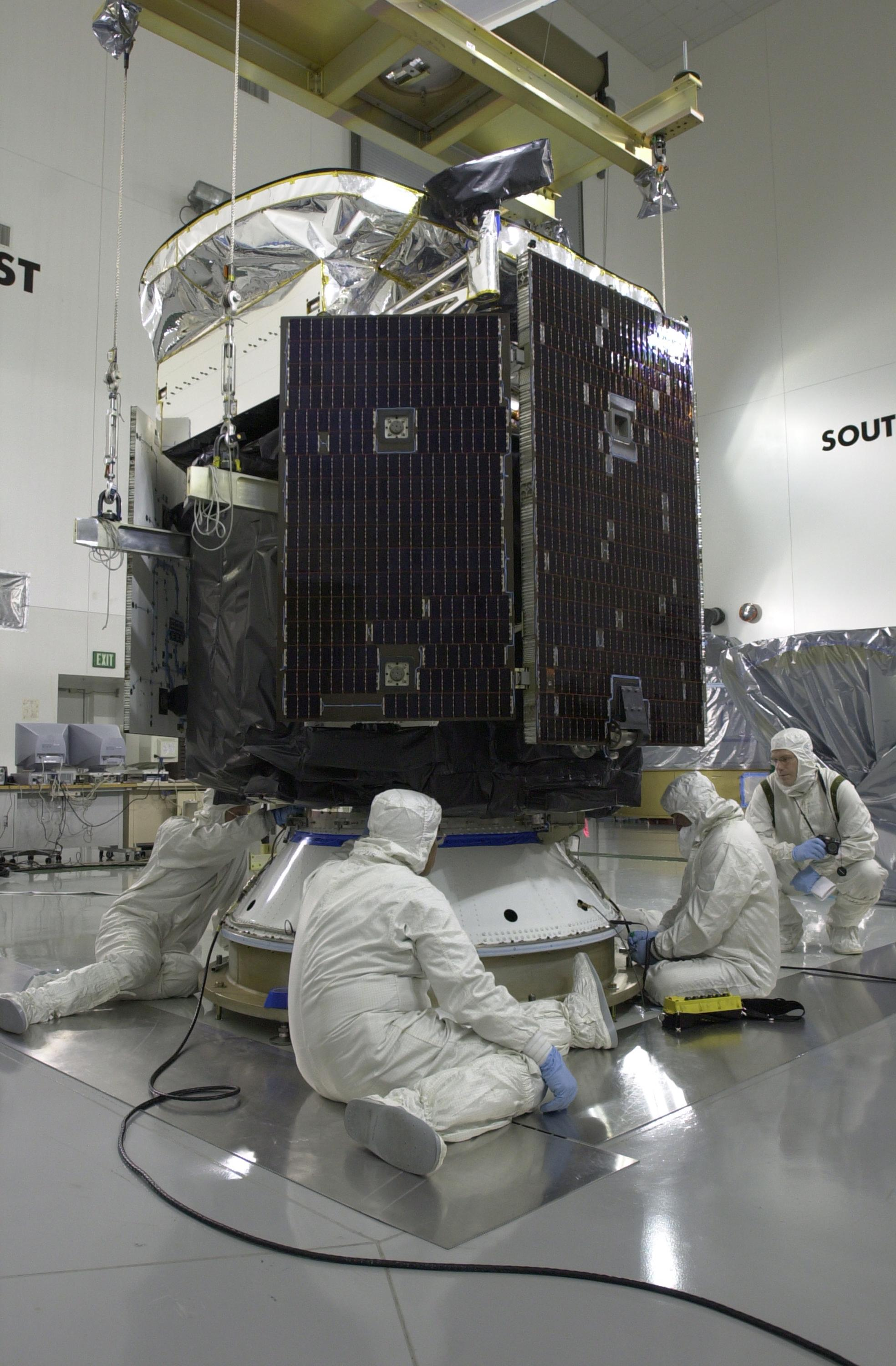
CloudSat at Vandenberg Air Force Base.

Animation of CloudSat's orbit. Earth is not shown

The main instrument on CloudSat was the Cloud Profiling Radar (CPR), a 94-GHz nadir-looking radar that measures the power backscattered by clouds as a function of distance from the radar. The radar instrument was developed at NASA's Jet Propulsion Laboratory (JPL) in Pasadena, California, with hardware contributions from the Canadian Space Agency. The overall design of the CPR was simple, well understood, and had a strong heritage from the many cloud radars already in operation in ground-based and airborne applications. Most design parameters and subsystem configurations were nearly identical to those for the Airborne Cloud Radar, which has been flying on the NASA DC-8 aircraft since 1998.

The CPR capitalized on existing radar expertise and experience at JPL. Other radars already flown successfully or developed by JPL include the Seasat SAR, the Shuttle Imaging Radars (SIR-A, SIR-B, SIR-C), the Shuttle Radar Topography Mission (SRTM), Magellan Venus Radar Mapper, Cassini Radar (mapping Saturn's moon Titan), NSCAT, and SeaWinds.

Based on radar lifetime data, NASA expected the radar to operate for at least three years with a 99% probability.

CloudSat is managed by the Jet Propulsion Laboratory. Colorado State University provides scientific leadership and science data processing and distribution. The cost of this project was approximately $200 million.

== Impact on radio astronomy ==
Power levels of the CloudSat radar were such that the receiver electronics deployed on a typical radio telescope could be burned out if the telescope was pointing at the zenith during an overflight. Moreover, the typical receiver would probably saturate during an overflight (or near overflight) no matter where the radio telescope were pointed, and similarly strong signal levels would have been received if a telescope pointed at or near CloudSat whenever the satellite was above the horizon (which could be of order one hour per day at a typical location). The narrow-band, Doppler-shifted radar signal would probably have been detectable in even fairly short integrations no matter where a radio telescope were pointed, whenever CloudSat was above the horizon.

== See also ==
- A-train (satellite constellation)
- Earth Observing System
- List of spaceflights (2006)
