= Scatterometer =

Meteorological instrumentation

A scatterometer or diffusionmeter is a scientific instrument to measure the return of a beam of light or radar waves scattered by diffusion in a medium such as air. Diffusionmeters using visible light are found in airports or along roads to measure horizontal visibility. Radar scatterometers use radio or microwaves to determine the normalized radar cross section (σ^{0}, "sigma zero" or "sigma naught") of a surface. They are often mounted on weather satellites to find wind speed and direction, and are used in industries to analyze the roughness of surfaces.

== Optical ==
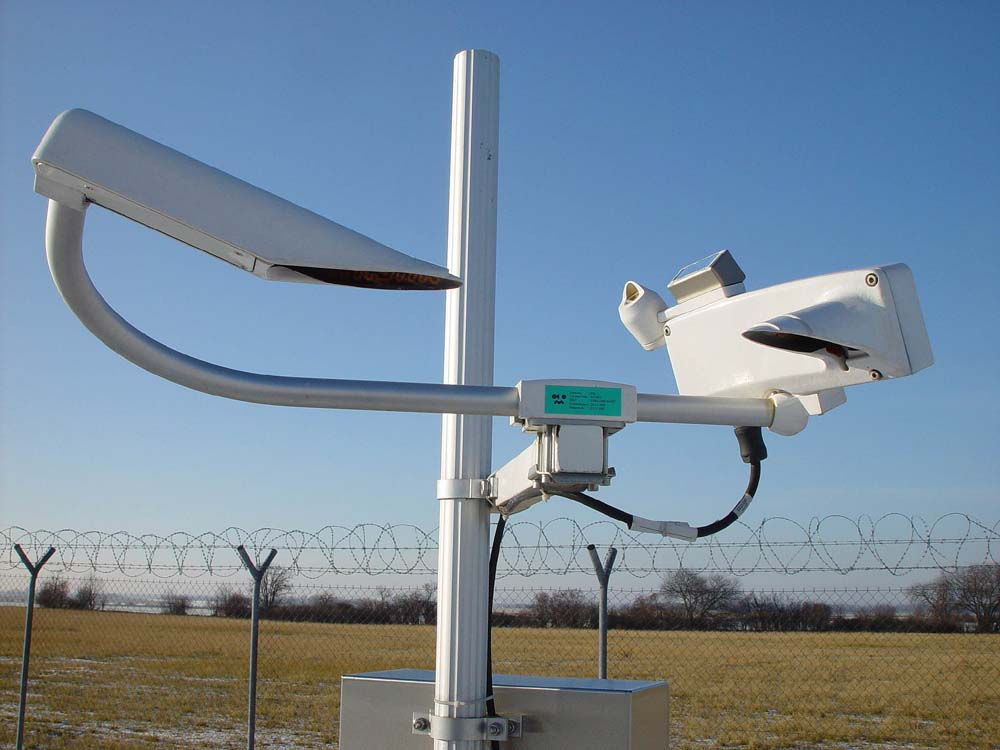
Airport scatterometer (or diffusometer).

Optical diffusionmeters are devices used in meteorology to find the optical range or the horizontal visibility. They consist of a light source, usually a laser, and a receiver. Both are placed at a 35° angle downward, aimed at a common area. Lateral scattering by the air along the light beam is quantified as an attenuation coefficient. Any departure from the clear air extinction coefficient (e.g. in fog) is measured and is inversely proportional to the visibility (the greater the loss, the lower is the visibility).

These devices are found in automatic weather stations for general visibility, along airport runways for runway visual range, or along roads for visual conditions. Their main drawback is that the measurement is done over the very small volume of air between the transmitter and the receiver. The visibility reported is therefore only representative of the general conditions around the instrument in generalized conditions (synoptic fog for instance). This is not always the case (e.g. patchy fog).

== Radar ==
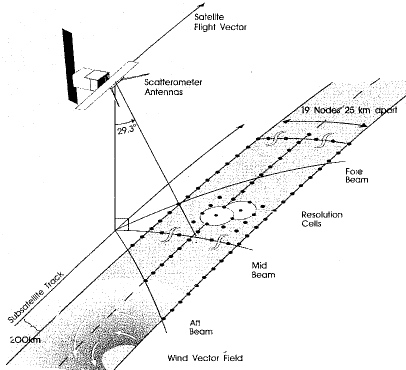
Radar scatterometer

A radar scatterometer operates by transmitting a pulse of microwave energy towards the Earth's surface and measuring the reflected energy. A separate measurement of the noise-only power is made and subtracted from the signal+noise measurement to determine the backscatter signal power. Sigma-0 (σ⁰) is computed from the signal power measurement using the distributed target radar equation. Scatterometer instruments are very precisely calibrated in order to make accurate backscatter measurements.

The primary application of spaceborne scatterometry has been measurements of near-surface winds over the ocean. Such instruments are known as wind scatterometers. By combining sigma-0 measurements from different azimuth angles, the near-surface wind vector over the ocean's surface can be determined using a geophysical model function (GMF) which relates wind and backscatter. Over the ocean, the radar backscatter results from scattering from wind-generated capillary-gravity waves, which are generally in equilibrium with the near-surface wind over the ocean. The scattering mechanism is known as Bragg scattering, which occurs from the waves that are in resonance with the microwaves.

The backscattered power depends on the wind speed and direction. Viewed from different azimuth angles, the observed backscatter from these waves varies. These variations can be exploited to estimate the sea surface wind, i.e. its speed and direction. This estimate process is sometimes termed 'wind retrieval' or 'model function inversion'. This is a non-linear inversion procedure based on an accurate knowledge of the GMF (in an empirical or semi-empirical form) that relates the scatterometer backscatter and the vector wind. Retrieval requires an angular diversity scatterometer measurements with the GMF, which is provided by the scatterometer making several backscatter measurements of the same spot on the ocean's surface from different azimuth angles.

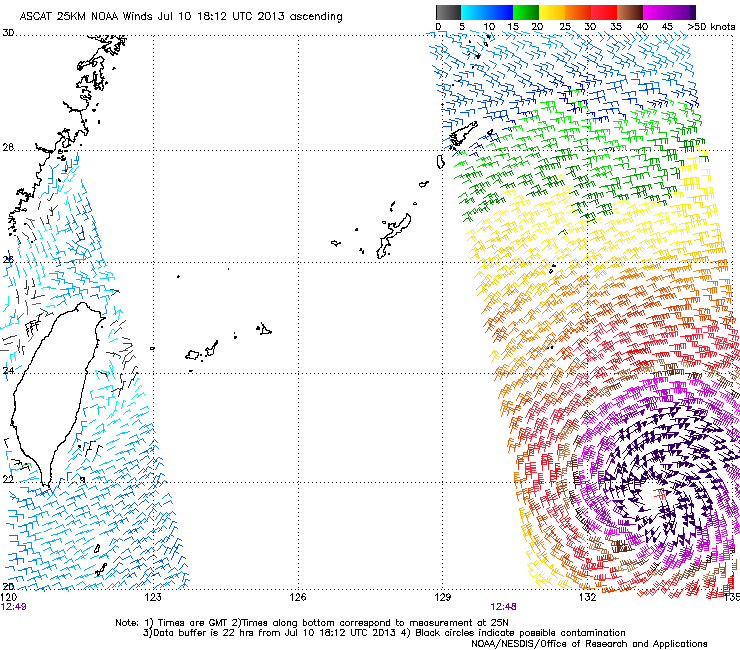
A snapshot of Typhoon Soulik while at Category 4 intensity captured by Eumetsat's ASCAT (Advanced Scatterometer) instrument on board the Metop-A satellite

Scatterometer wind measurements are used for air-sea interaction, climate studies and are particularly useful for monitoring hurricanes. Scatterometer backscatter data are applied to the study of vegetation, soil moisture, polar ice, tracking Antarctic icebergs and global change. Scatterometer measurements have been used to measure winds over sand and snow dunes from space. Non-terrestrial applications include study of Solar System moons using space probes. This is especially the case with the NASA/ESA Cassini mission to Saturn and its moons.

Several generations of wind scatterometers have been flown in space by NASA, ESA, and NASDA. The first operational wind scatterometer was known as the Seasat Scatterometer (SASS) and was launched in 1978. It was a fan-beam system operating at Ku-band (14 GHz). In 1991 ESA launched the European Remote-Sensing Satellite ERS-1 Advanced Microwave Instrument (AMI) scatterometer, followed by the ERS-2 AMI scatterometer in 1995. Both AMI fan-beam systems operated at C-band (5.6 GHz). In 1996 NASA launched the NASA Scatterometer (NSCAT), on board the NASDA ADEOS I satellite, a Ku-band fan-beam system. NASA launched the first scanning scatterometer, known as SeaWinds, on QuikSCAT in 1999. It operated at Ku-band. A second SeaWinds instrument was flown on the NASDA ADEOS-2 in 2002. The Indian Space Research Organisation launched a Ku-band scatterometer on their Oceansat-2 platform in 2009. ESA and EUMETSAT launched the first C-band ASCAT in 2006 onboard Metop-A. The Cyclone Global Navigation Satellite System (CYGNSS), launched in 2016, is a constellation of eight small satellites utilizing a bistatic approach by analyzing the reflection from the Earth's surface of Global Positioning System (GPS) signals, rather than using an onboard radar transmitter.

=== Contribution to botany ===
Scatterometers helped to prove the hypothesis, dating from mid-19th century, of the anisotropic (direction dependent) long distance dispersion by wind to explain the strong floristic affinities between landmasses.

A work, published by the journal Science in May 2004 with the title "Wind as a Long-Distance Dispersal Vehicle in the Southern Hemisphere", used daily measurements of wind azimuth and speed taken by the SeaWinds scatterometer from 1999 to 2003. They found a stronger correlation of floristic similarities with wind connectivity than with geographic proximities, which supports the idea that wind is a dispersal vehicle for many organisms in the Southern Hemisphere.

=== Semiconductor and precision manufacturing ===
Scatterometers are widely used in metrology for roughness of polished and lapped surfaces in optical (i.e. total integrated scatterometry developed by Dr. Jean M. Bennett and colleagues), semiconductor and precision machining industries. They provide a fast and non-contact alternative to traditional stylus methods for topography assessment. Scatterometers are compatible with vacuum environments, are not sensitive to vibration, and can be readily integrated with surface processing and other metrology tools.

== Uses ==
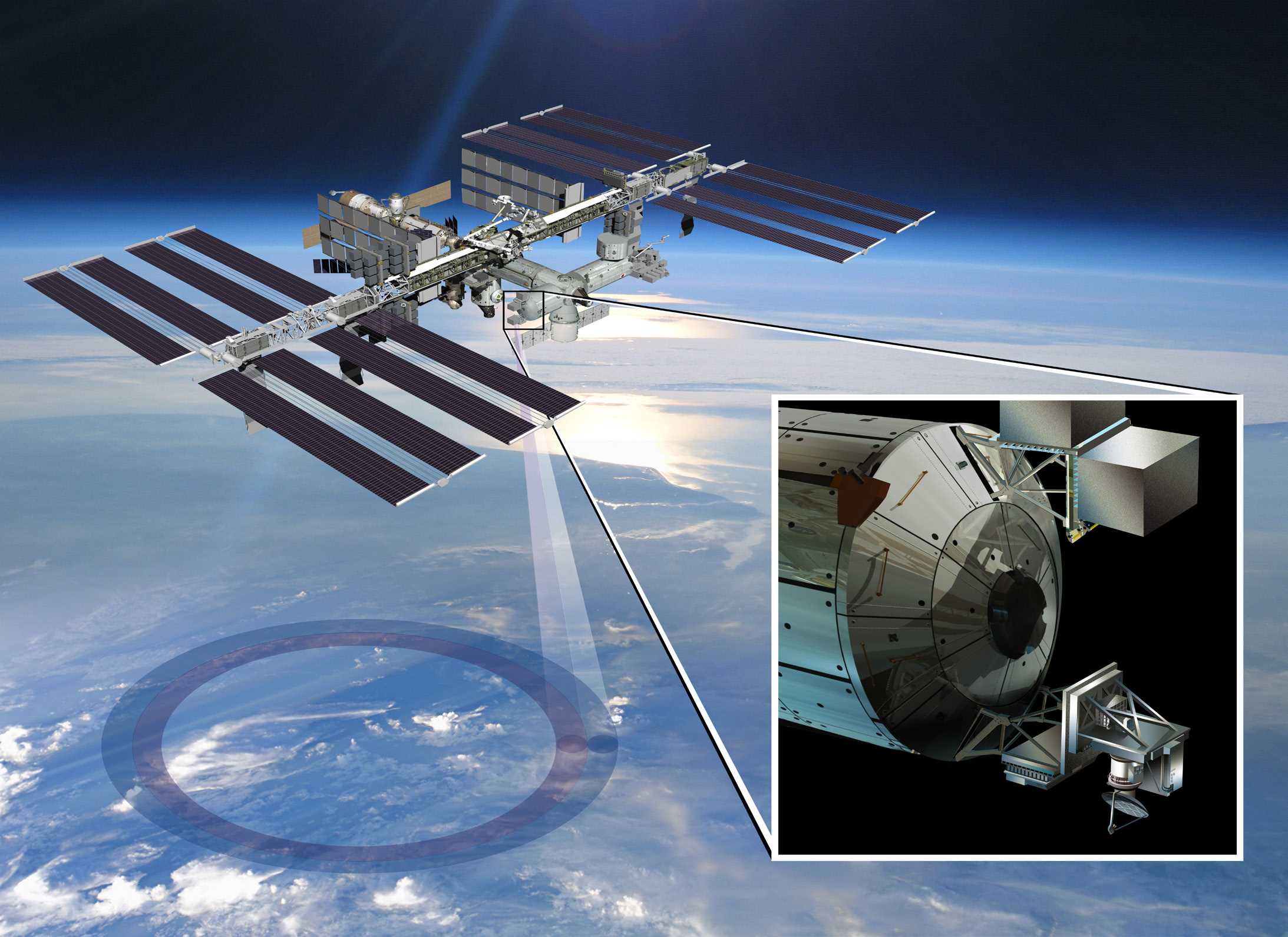
Illustration of the ISS-RapidScat location on the International Space Station

Examples of use on Earth observation satellites or installed instruments, and dates of operation:

- NSCAT (NASA Scatterometer) instrument on ADEOS I (1996–97)
- SeaWinds instrument on QuikSCAT (2001–2009)
- OSCAT-2 instrument on SCATSAT-1 (launched 2016)
- SCAT instrument on Oceansat-2 (2009–2014)
- ISS-RapidScat on the International Space Station (2014–2016)
- ASCAT on MetOp satellites
- The CYGNSS constellation (launched 2016)
- SCA on MetOp-SG B-series satellites (MetOp-SG-B1 launch is foreseen in 2026)
