= ADEOS II =

Derelict Japanese Earth observation satellite

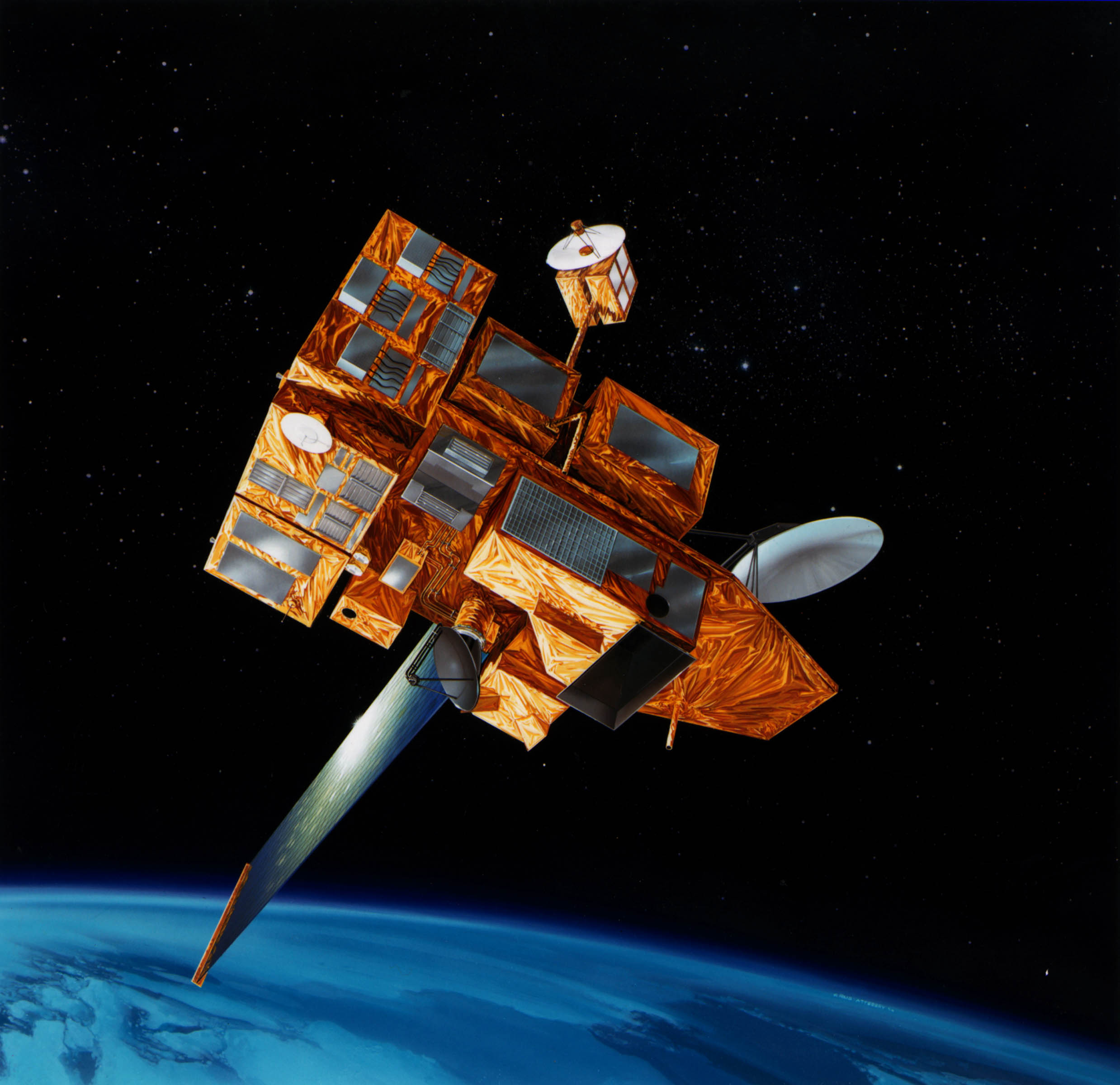
- Illustration of ADEOS II
- Names: Advanced Earth Observing Satellite II; Midori II; ADEOS 2
- Mission type: Earth observation Environmental monitoring
- Operator: NASDA
- COSPAR ID: 2002-056A
- SATCAT no.: 27597
- Mission duration: 5 years (planned); 10 months and 9 days (achieved)

Spacecraft properties
- Bus: ADEOS
- Manufacturer: Mitsubishi Electric Corporation
- Launch mass: 3,680 kg (8,110 lb)
- Payload mass: 1,300 kg (2,900 lb)
- Dimensions: 6 × 4 × 4 m (20 × 13 × 13 ft)
- Power: 5.3 kW

Start of mission
- Launch date: 14 December 2002, 01:31 UTC
- Rocket: H-IIA 202
- Launch site: Tanegashima Space Center, Yoshinobu 1
- Contractor: Mitsubishi Heavy Industries

End of mission
- Last contact: 23 October 2003, 23:55 UTC

Orbital parameters
- Reference system: Geocentric orbit
- Regime: Sun-synchronous orbit
- Perigee altitude: 806 km (501 mi)
- Apogee altitude: 807 km (501 mi)
- Inclination: 98.70°
- Period: 101.00 minutes

Instruments
Instruments
- AMSR: Advanced Microwave Scanning Radiometer
- GLI: Global Imager
- ILAS-2: Improved Limb Atmospheric Spectrometer 2
- POLDER: Polarization and Directionality of Earth's Reflectances
- SeaWinds: SeaWinds

ADEOS II (Advanced Earth Observing Satellite 2) was an Earth observation satellite (EOS) launched by NASDA, with contributions from NASA and CNES, in December 2002. and it was the successor to the 1996 mission ADEOS I. The mission ended in October 2003 after the satellite's solar panels failed.

== Mission overview ==
The three primary objectives of the mission, as identified by NASDA, were to:

- Regularly monitor the water and energy cycle as a part of the global climate system
- Quantitatively estimate the biomass and fundamental productivity as a part of the carbon cycle
- Detect trends in long term climate change as a result of continuing the observations started by ADEOS I

The project had a proposed minimum life of three years, with a five-year goal.

== Instruments ==
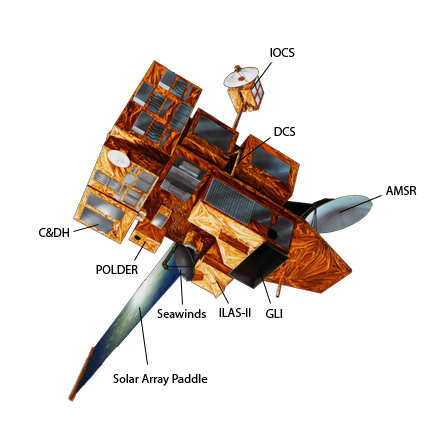
Annotation of ADEOS II and its instruments

The satellite was equipped with five primary instruments: Advanced Microwave Scanning Radiometer (AMSR), Global Imager (GLI), Improved Limb Atmospheric Spectrometer-II (ILAS-II), Polarization and Directionality of the Earth's Reflectances (POLDER), and SeaWinds. These instruments were designed to monitor Earth's water cycle, study biomass in the carbon cycle, and detect trends in long-term climate change. The mission was established to continue the work undertaken by ADEOS I between 1996 and 1997.

=== Advanced Microwave Scanning Radiometer (AMSR) ===
AMSR monitors water vapor, precipitation, sea surface, wind, and ice by means of microwave radiation emanating from Earth's surface and atmosphere. It is a radiometer that operates in eight frequency bands covering 6.9 GHz to 89 GHz, and monitors the horizontal and vertical polarizations separately. With a dish of 2 m (6 ft 7 in) aperture, the spatial resolution is 5 km (3.1 mi) in the 89 GHz band, degrading to 60 km (37 mi) at 6.9 GHz.

=== Global Imager (GLI) ===
GLI (GLobal Imager) is an optical sensor to observe solar radiation reflected from Earth's surface and map vegetation, clouds, etc. The data is acquired in 23 visible/near-infrared, and in 13 far infrared channels. The scanning is done by a rotating mirror covering 12 km (7.5 mi) along track and 1,600 km (990 mi) cross-track, and at a resolution of 1 km (0.62 mi).

=== Improved Limb Atmospheric Spectrometer 2 (ILAS-2) ===
ILAS-2 maps the vertical distribution of O_{3}, NO_{2}, HNO_{3}, H_{2}O, CFC-11, CFC-12, CH_{4}, N_{2}O, and ClONO_{2}, as well as the distribution of temperature and pressure, all in the stratosphere. It observes the absorption spectrum in Earth's atmospheric limb in the 3-13 micron wavelength band, and in the 753-784 nm band of the occulting Sun. The altitude resolution is 100 m (330 ft).

=== Polarization and Directionality of Earth's Reflectances (POLDER) ===
POLDER measures the polarization, and spectral characteristics of the solar light reflected by aerosols, clouds, oceans and land surfaces. Eight narrow band wavelengths (443, 490, 564, 670, 763, 765, 865, and 910 nm) are covered by the instrument which enables identification of the physical and optical properties of the aerosols and their role in radiation budget.

=== SeaWinds ===
SeaWinds is a scatterometer that provides wind speed and direction by observing the microwave reflection from ocean surfaces. With its 1 m (3 ft 3 in) dish, it scans the surface along conical surfaces at 18 RPM. It provides speed at an accuracy of 2 m/s, wind direction at an accuracy of 20°, both with a spatial resolution of 5 km (3.1 mi).

== Subsystems ==
In addition to the five main instruments, nine avionic subsystems were allocated to the bus module. These were the Communication and Data-Handling Subsystem (C&DH), Inter-Orbit Communication Subsystem (IOCS), Mission Data Processing Subsystem (MDPS), Optical Data Recorder (ODR), Electrical Power Subsystem (EPS), Paddle Subsystem (PDL), Attitude and Orbit Control Subsystem (AOCS), Reaction Control Subsystem (RCS), and the Direct Transmission Subsystem (DTL).

The C&DH subsystem received and decoded the satellite's tracking control command signals and acted as a processing interface between the instruments. It was capable of adjusting settings on the instruments – such as temperature and voltage. The IOCS was used to communicate with data relay satellites (see Data transfer).

The MDP device formatted mission data to be sent via the IOCS, and would process it into a data packet. The ODR was a large-volume storage device that used an optical magnetic disk system. The EPS provided power to the satellite's subsystems. The PDL managed the satellite's solar panel, and transferred electrical energy to the EPS. The solar panel was capable of generating 5 kW using 55,680 solar cells on a jointed mast.

The AOCS was used to establish the attitude control following the satellite's deployment from the launch vehicle. It was subsequently used to adjust the satellite's attitude, orbit, and solar paddle. The AOCS was equipped with a number of attitude sensors, including a control-standard unit (IRC), an Earth sensor (ESA), and a fine Sun sensor assembly (FSSA).

The RCS was used to generate propulsion power for attitude adjustments after deployment and control orbit using data from the AOCS.

== Data transfer ==
ADEOS II transferred data to and from Artemis and the Data Relay Test Satellite (DRTS). The Artemis connection transferred information over a 26 GHz Ka-band link (for payload data) and a 2 GHz S-band link (for telemetry, tracking and control data).

These signals were then downlinked to the Earth Observation Center (EOC) via feeder link stations and the Redu Station. ADEOS II also sent mission data directly to NASA stations, which routed information to bodies such as the EOC and sensor-providing organisations.

== Launch ==
The mission was originally scheduled to launch aboard a H-II launch vehicle in February 2002. This was postponed as the Japanese Space Activities Commission would not launch without having three successful missions aboard the new H-IIA launch vehicle.

The satellite was successfully launched from Tanegashima Space Center pad YLP-1 on 14 December 2002, aboard H-IIA 202. Other payloads onboard included the Japanese MicroLabsat and WEOS microsatellites, as well as the Australian FedSat.

== Failure ==
On 23 October 2003, the solar panel failed. At 23:49 UTC, the satellite switched to "light load" operation due to an unknown error. This was intended to power down all observation equipment to conserve energy. At 23:55 UTC, communications between the satellite and the ground stations ended, with no further telemetry received. Further attempts to procure telemetry data on 24 October 2003 (at 00:25 and 02:05 UTC) also failed.

=== Investigation ===
After the power failure, JAXA formed the Midori II anomaly investigation team. Analysis of data received before transmissions ceased showed that the solar panel's power output had decreased from 6 kW to 1 kW. The investigation team began surveying the mission to establish whether the failure was due to a technical malfunction or a solar flare.

One hypothesis was that debris had impacted the satellite's power harness between the solar array and the satellite bus. The harness was a core of wires enclosed in multi-layer insulation. The debris impact was theorised to have caused an electric arc, which is an example of the spacecraft charging effect.

The mission officially ended at the end of October 2003, with JAXA conceding that the "possibility of restoring the operations of Midori II [was] extremely slim". The mission, which had cost approximately 70 billion Yen (US$570 million) was only able to recoup an estimated 300 million Yen through insurance.
