= CALIPSO =

Environmental satellite

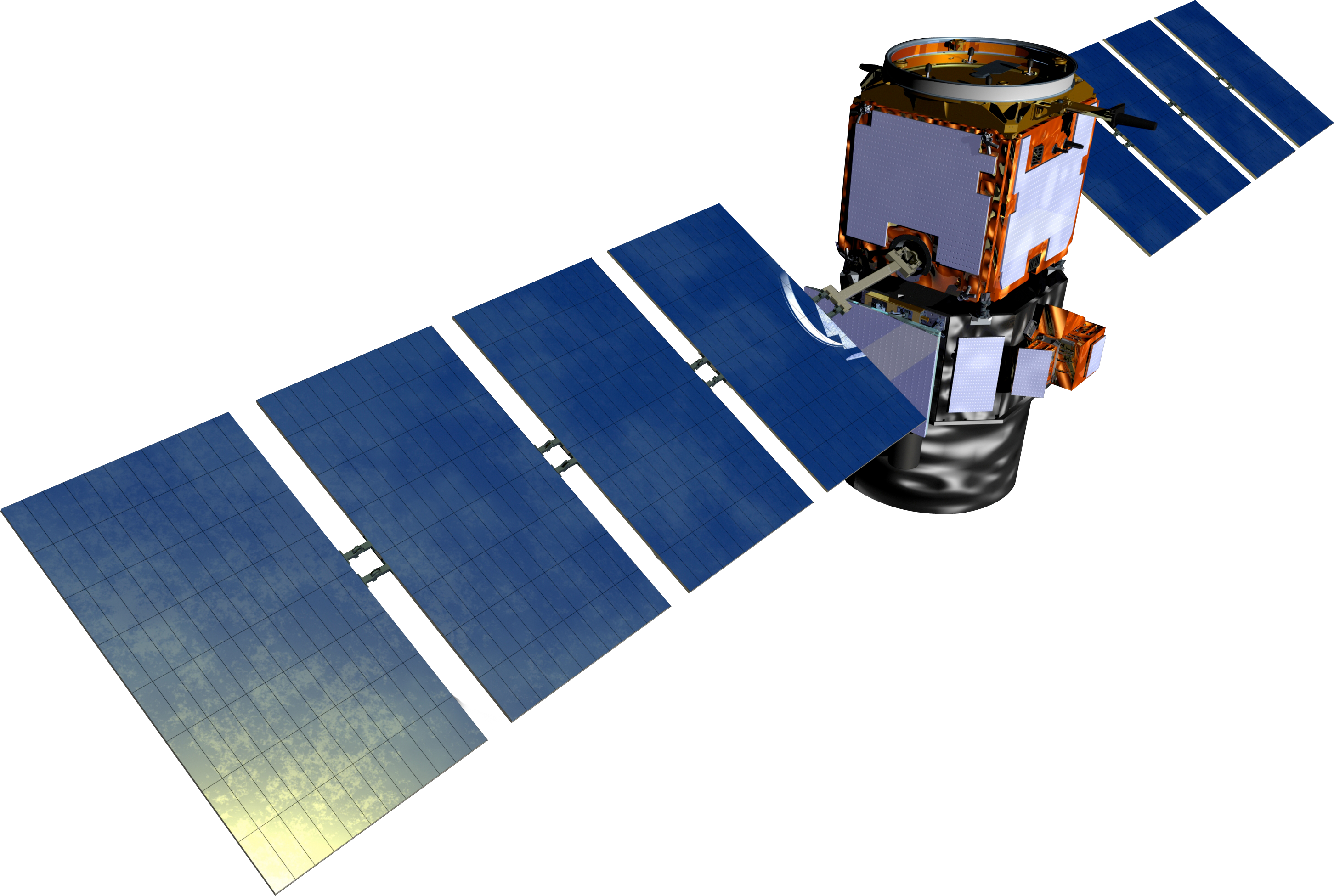
- CALIPSO
- Mission type: Earth observation
- Operator: NASA / CNES
- COSPAR ID: 2006-016A
- SATCAT no.: 29108
- Website: www-calipso.larc.nasa.gov
- Mission duration: 20 years

Spacecraft properties
- Launch mass: 587 kilograms (1,294 lb)
- Dimensions: 1.49 m × 1.84 m × 2.31 m (4.9 ft × 6.0 ft × 7.6 ft)
- Power: 562 W

Start of mission
- Launch date: April 28, 2006, 10:02:16 UTC
- Rocket: Delta 7420-10C D314
- Launch site: Vandenberg AFB SLC-2W

Orbital parameters
- Reference system: Geocentric
- Regime: Sun-synchronous
- Semi-major axis: 7,080.7 kilometres (4,399.7 mi)
- Eccentricity: 0.0001111
- Perigee altitude: 701 kilometers (436 mi)
- Apogee altitude: 703 kilometers (437 mi)
- Inclination: 98.2176 degrees
- Period: 98.50 minutes
- RAAN: 285.6451 degrees
- Argument of perigee: 80.3481 degrees
- Mean anomaly: 279.7840 degrees
- Mean motion: 14.57093780
- Revolution no.: 40530

CALIPSO was a joint NASA (US) and CNES (France) environmental satellite, built in the Cannes Mandelieu Space Center, which was launched atop a Delta II rocket on 28 April 2006. Its name stands for Cloud-Aerosol Lidar and Infrared Pathfinder Satellite Observations. CALIPSO launched alongside CloudSat.

Passive and active remote sensing instruments on board the CALIPSO satellite monitored aerosols and clouds 24 hours a day. CALIPSO was originally part of the "A-Train" alongside CloudSat, but moved to a lower orbit called the "C-Train" in 2018. The mission ended on August 1, 2023 after over 17 years. Final passivation occurred on December 15, 2023.

== Mission ==
Three instruments:

- Cloud-Aerosol Lidar with Orthogonal Polarization (CALIOP) - a lidar that provided high-resolution vertical profiles of aerosols and clouds.
- Wide Field Camera (WFC) - a modified version of the commercial off-the-shelf Ball Aerospace CT-633 star tracker camera. It was selected to match band 1 of the MODIS instrument on the Aqua satellite.
- Imaging Infrared Radiometer (IIR) - used to detect cirrus cloud emissivity and particle size. The CALIOP laser beam is aligned with the center of the IIR image to optimize joint CALIOP/IIR observations.

In February 2009, CALIPSO switched over to the redundant laser as scheduled. The primary laser achieved its mission goal of three years of successful operation, and the redundant laser has been performing beyond expectations.

The CALIPSO mission was granted extended mission status in June 2009. CALIPSO moved to the C-Train in 2018. The mission ended on August 1, 2023 due to lack of propellant.

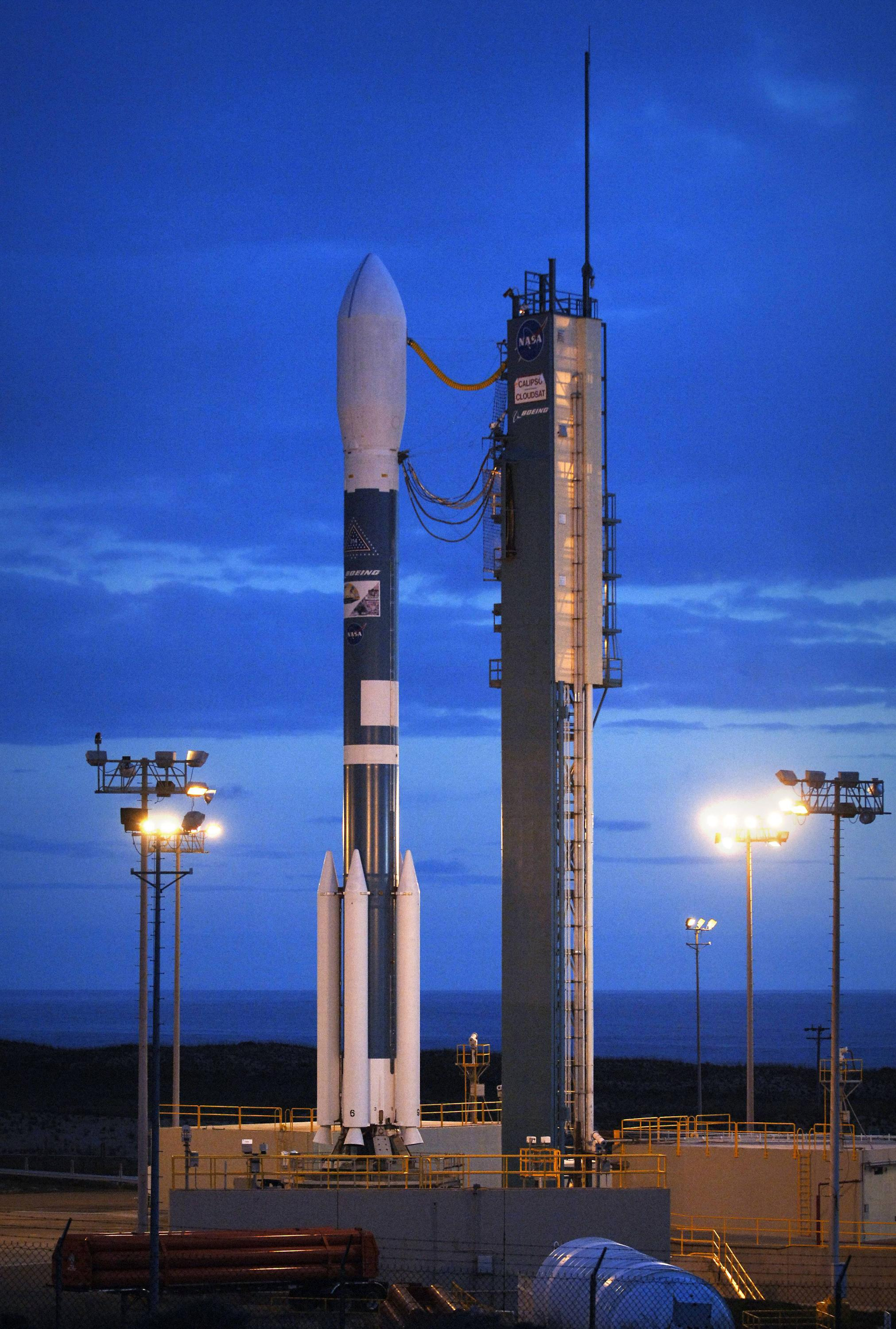
The Delta II rocket with CALIPSO and CloudSat on Launch Pad SLC-2W, VAFB.

== See also ==
- A-train (satellite constellation)
- Earth Observing System
- List of spaceflights (2006)
