= A-train (satellite constellation) =

Satellite constellation of three Earth observation satellites

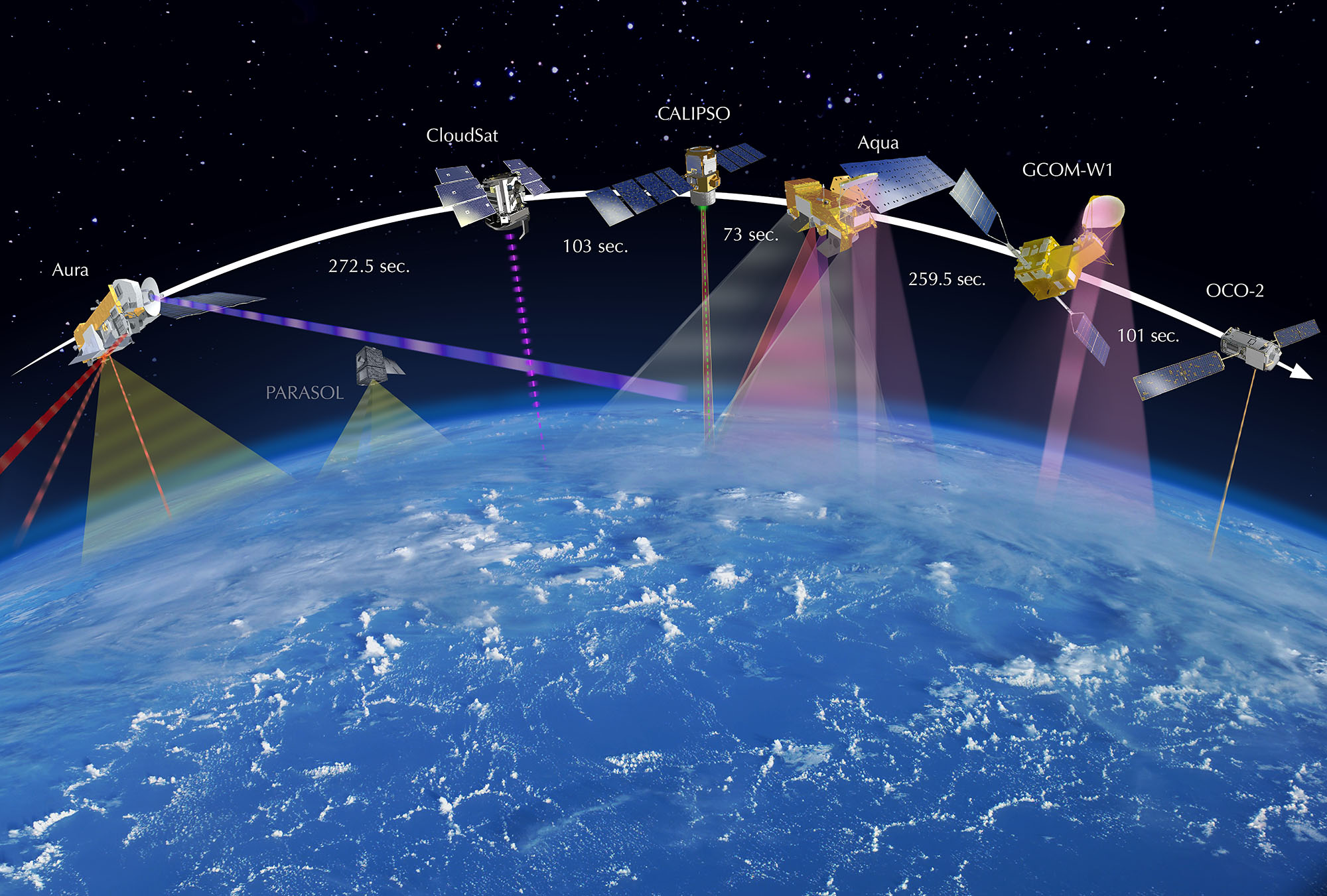
A-train in 2013. As of 2026, the A-Train consists of three satellites. CloudSat and CALIPSO are no longer officially part of the constellation.

The A-train (from Afternoon Train) is a satellite constellation of three Earth observation satellites of varied nationality in Sun-synchronous orbit at an altitude that is slightly variable for each satellite.

The orbit, at an inclination of 98.2°, crosses the equator each day at around 1:30 pm solar time, giving the constellation its name (the "A" stands for "afternoon") and crosses the equator again on the night side of the Earth, at around 1:30 am.

They are spaced a few minutes apart from each other so their collective observations may be used to build high-definition three-dimensional images of Earth's atmosphere and surface.

== Satellites ==
=== Active ===
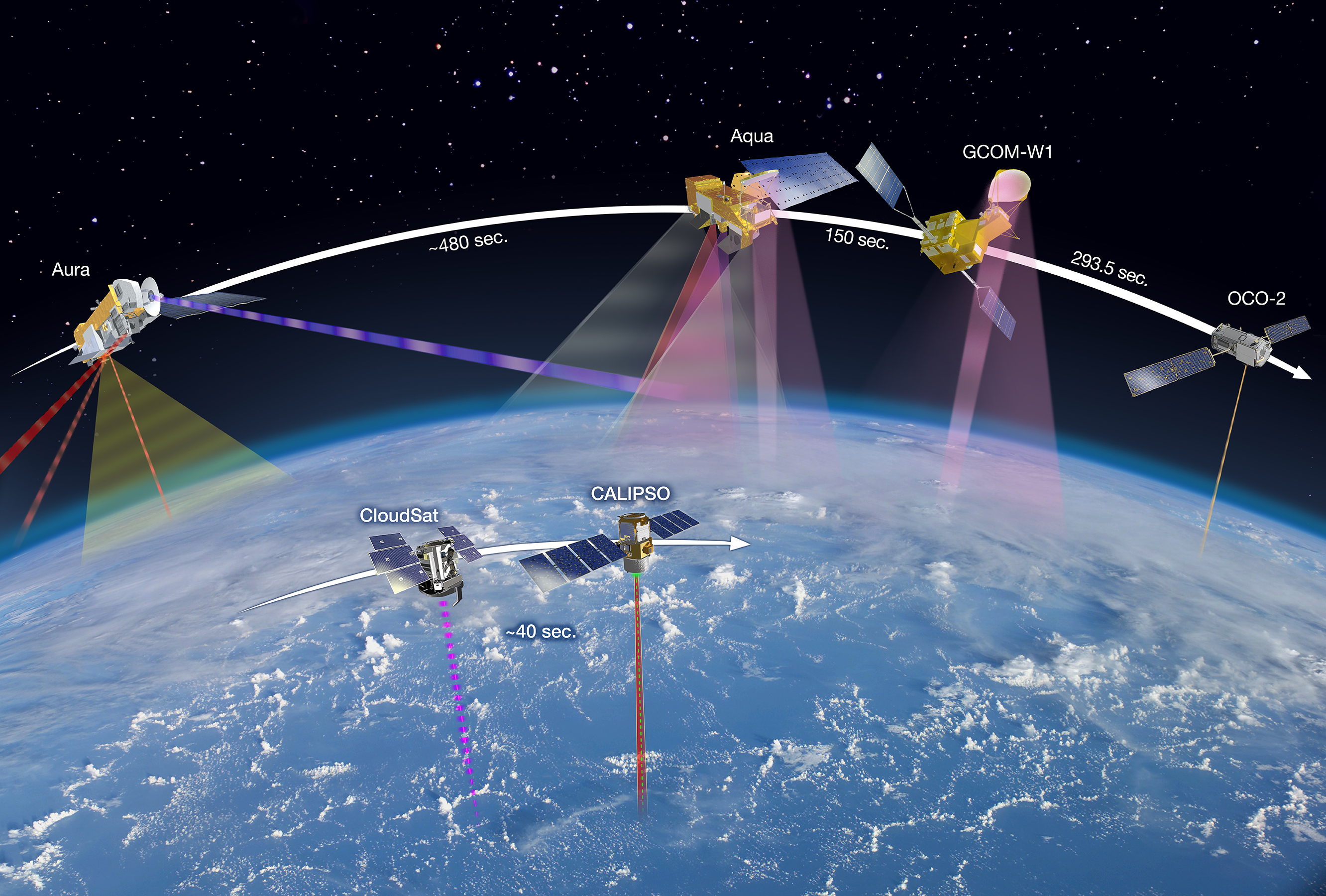
A-train and C-train in 2019

Estimated future changes to Aura's equator crossing time and altitude (as of Sept. 2026)

The train, as of January 2026, consists of three active satellites:

- OCO-2, lead spacecraft in formation, replaces the failed OCO and was launched for NASA on July 2, 2014.
- GCOM-W1 "SHIZUKU", follows OCO-2 by 11 minutes, launched by JAXA on May 18, 2012.
- Aura, a multi-national satellite, lags OCO-2 by 19 minutes, launched for NASA on July 15, 2004.
  - Periodic spacecraft maneuvers to maintain Aura’s position in the A-Train were last done in April 2023 and Aura has since been allowed to drift to save fuel for eventual safe deorbit as insufficient power generation by the solar array is predicted to be its life-limiting factor by July 2028. As a result, its solar time (mean local time (MLT)) crossing over the equator shows corresponding drift, which was <15 min through late-2024, ~30 min by mid-2025, an hour by mid-2026 and is projected to be ~105 min by September 2027 and ~150 mins by August 2028. However, there is the possibility of a daily spacecraft maneuver, called “pointing for power” to align the solar panels with the sun, so that the Aura satellite may continue beyond 2028.

=== Past ===
- PARASOL, launched by CNES on December 18, 2004 and moved to another (lower) orbit on December 2, 2009. PARASOL was deactivated in 2013
- CloudSat, launched with CALIPSO on April 28, 2006 and moved to another (lower) orbit on February 22, 2018. Now part of the C-train.
- CALIPSO, launched on April 28, 2006, is a joint effort of CNES and NASA. It follows CloudSat by no more than 8.5 seconds. CALIPSO was moved to CloudSat's new orbit in September 2018. It was then part of the C-train with Cloudsat until it was officially decommissioned on August 1, 2023.
- Aqua, used to run 4 minutes behind GCOM-W1, launched for NASA on May 4, 2002. In January 2022, it descended from the A-Train to save fuel and now is in a free-drift mode, wherein its equatorial crossing time is slowly drifting to later times.

=== Failed ===
- OCO, destroyed by a launch vehicle failure on February 24, 2009, and was replaced by OCO-2.
- Glory, failed during launch on a Taurus XL rocket on March 4, 2011, and would have flown between CALIPSO and Aura.
