= ADEOS I =

Derelict Japanese Earth observation satellite

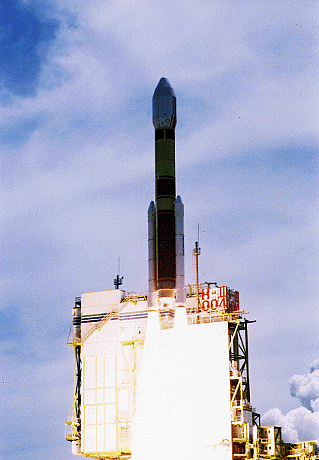
- Launch of ADEOS I aboard an H-II launch vehicle
- Names: Advanced Earth Observing Satellite; Midori
- Mission type: Earth observation Environmental monitoring
- Operator: NASDA
- COSPAR ID: 1996-046A
- SATCAT no.: 24277
- Mission duration: 3 years (planned); 10 months and 13 days (achieved)

Spacecraft properties
- Manufacturer: Mitsubishi Electric Corporation
- Launch mass: 3,560 kg (7,850 lb)
- Payload mass: 1,300 kg (2,900 lb)
- Dimensions: 4 × 4 × 5 m (13 × 13 × 16 ft); Solar paddle: 3 × 13 m (9.8 × 42.7 ft)
- Power: 4.5 kW

Start of mission
- Launch date: 17 August 1996, 01:53 UTC
- Rocket: H-II F4
- Launch site: Tanegashima Space Center, Yoshinobu 1
- Contractor: Mitsubishi Heavy Industries
- Entered service: 1 January 1997

End of mission
- Last contact: 30 June 1997, 07:21 UTC

Orbital parameters
- Reference system: Geocentric orbit
- Regime: Sun-synchronous orbit
- Perigee altitude: 794 km (493 mi)
- Apogee altitude: 815 km (506 mi)
- Inclination: 98.60°
- Period: 101.00 minutes
Instruments
- OCTS: Ocean Color and Temperature Scanner
- AVNIR: Advanced Visible and Near-Infrared Radiometer
- NSCAT: NASA Scatterometer
- TOMS: Total Ozone Mapping Spectrometer
- POLDER: Polarization and Directionality of Earth's Reflectances
- IMG: Interferometric Monitor for Greenhouse Gases
- ILAS: Improved Limb Atmospheric Spectrometer
- RIS: Retroreflector in Space

ADEOS I (Advanced Earth Observing Satellite 1) was an Earth observation satellite launched by NASDA in 1996. The mission's Japanese name, Midori means "green". The mission ended in July 1997 after the satellite sustained structural damage to the solar panel. Its successor, ADEOS II, was launched in 2002. Like the first mission, it ended after less than a year, also following solar panel malfunctions.

== Mission ==
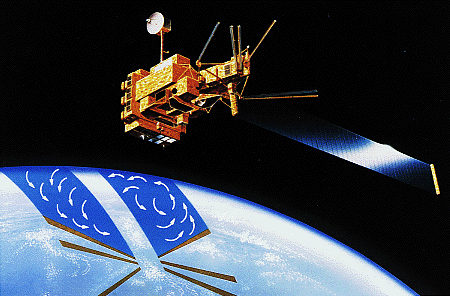
ADEOS I satellite

ADEOS was designed to observe Earth's environmental changes, focusing on global warming, depletion of the ozone layer, and deforestation.

== Instruments ==
On board the satellite are eight instruments developed by NASDA, NASA, and CNES. The Ocean Color and Temperature Scanner (OCTS) is a whisk broom radiometer developed by NASDA. The Advanced Visible and Near Infrared Radiometer (AVNIR), an optoelectronic scanning radiometer with CCD detectors, was also produced by NASDA. The NASA Scatterometer (NSCAT), developed with the Jet Propulsion Laboratory (JPL), used fan-beam Doppler signals to measure wind speeds over bodies of water. The Total Ozone Mapping Spectrometer (TOMS) was built by CNES to study changes to Earth's ozone layer. The Polarization and Directionality of the Earth's Reflectance (POLDER) device was also developed by CNES, and was also launched on ADEOS II. The Improved Limb Atmospheric Spectrometer (ILAS) was developed by NASDA and the Environment Agency of Japan, and used grating spectrometers to measure the properties of trace gases using solar occultation. The Retroreflector in Space (RIS) and Interferometric Monitor for Greenhouse Gases (IMG) were both developed by Japan, and studied atmospheric trace gases and greenhouse gases respectively.

=== Advanced Visible and Near-Infrared Radiometer (AVNIR) ===
The AVNIR was a multispectral radiometer for observing the Earth in the visible and near-IR wavelengths at high spatial resolution. The AVNIR employs a Schmidt optical system and an electronic scanning CCD silicon array. The AVNIR consisted of three visible channels (0.40-0.50, 0.52-0.62, 0.62-0.72 microns) and one near-IR channel (0.82-0.92 micron). In addition, the AVNIR also had a panchromatic channel at 0.52-0.72 micron. The AVNIR was able to tilt 40° on either side of the ground track producing a 5.7° field of view and an 60 km (37 mi) swath width. The ground resolution was 16 m (52 ft) for the multispectral bands and 8 m (26 ft) for the panchromatic band.

=== Improved Limb Atmospheric Spectrometer (ILAS) ===
The ILAS instrument was provided by the Environment Agency of Japan for ADEOS mission. The ILAS was designed to measure the variability of the concentration of ozone and other trace constituents (such as Nitric acid (HNO_{3}) and H_{2}O) in the stratosphere and to monitor ozone layer dynamics. The ILAS system consisted of two observation packages: One was a 12 cm (4.7 in) telescope containing 44 pyroelectric detectors linearly arrayed for observations in the infrared region of the spectrum (6.0-6.8, 7.3-11.8 microns). The other was a 3 cm (1.2 in) telescope consisting of a photodiode array for observations in the visible region (0.753-0.784 microns). Sunrise and sunset observations was made at 2 km (1.2 mi) resolution over the 10–60 km (6.2–37.3 mi) vertical range.

=== Interferometric Monitor for Greenhouse Gases (IMG) ===
The IMG instrument was provided by the Ministry of International Trade and Industry (MITI) of Japan for ADEOS. The IMG is designed to monitor the horizontal distribution of greenhouse effect gases (carbon dioxide, methane, nitrous oxide, etc.) and the vertical distribution of temperature and water vapor. The IMG used an interferometric spectrometer which scanned the spectrum from the middle infrared to thermal infrared (0.3 to 15 microns). A mechanical cryogenic coolant system will be used to regulate the temperature of the quantum detectors. An image motion compensation mirror will be used to compensate for the satellite orbital motion. Measurements was made in 20 km (12 mi) swaths at 8 km (5.0 mi) resolution.

=== NASA Scatterometer (NSCAT) ===
The NSCAT, an active microwave satellite scatterometer, was developed by NASA/JPL as part of the NASA's Earth Probe Mission To Planet Earth (MTPE) program and flown on the Japanese ADEOS. The NSCAT instrument is intended to be a follow-on to the Seasat scatterometer (SASS) flown in 1978. The NSCAT was designed to measure the ocean surface wind velocity and provided data on air-sea interactions, calculations for large-scale fluxes between atmosphere and ocean, air-sea coupling and interannual variability of the Earth's climate. The NSCAT was a 13.995 GHz (Ku-band) active microwave radar that transmitted continuous pulses to the ocean surface and received backscattered radiation from the Earth. The radar cross section of the surface was used to derive the backscattered radiation as a function of both wind speed and direction and to determine the wind vector. The NSCAT consisted of three major subsystems: the Radio Frequency Subsystem (RFS), the antenna subsystem, and the Digital Data Subsystem (DSS). Transmitted pulses at 13.995 GHz are generated by the RFS to each antenna beam. A low-noise amplifier of 3 dB was used to amplify the return echo. The antenna subsystem consisted of 6 identical, dual-polarization fan beam antennas, approximately 3 m (9.8 ft) long. The six antennas were calibrated to 0.25 dB prior to launch. The NSCAT was the first spaceborne scatterometer to employ on-board digital processing of the Doppler-shifted signal. The NSCAT measured two swaths, each 600 km (370 mi) wide at nadir and radar cross sections in three azimuth angles for a wind speed accuracy of 2 meter/sec and direction accuracy of 20° and a spatial resolution of 25 km (16 mi). NSCAT data was processed to science products directly from telemetry by the NSCAT Data Processing and Instrument Operations (DP&IO).

=== Ocean Color and Temperature Scanner (OCTS) ===
The OCTS was one of the core instruments developed by NASDA for ADEOS. The OCTS is a multispectral radiometer designed to obtain measurements of global ocean color, sea surface temperature, distribution of phytoplankton and oceanic primary productivity, sediment, and suspended material. The OCTS scanned the Earth in the direction perpendicular to the satellite track with a rotating mirror. The OCTS employs a quantum detector and a large radiant cryogenic cooler for the infrared detectors. The rotating mirror was able to tilt 40° forward or backward along the ground track to minimize the effects of Sun glitter from the ocean surface. The OCTS consisted of three infrared channels (8.0-9.0, 10.5-11.5, 11.5-12.5 microns), one middle-IR channel (3.55-3.85 microns), two near-IR channels (0.745-0.785, 0.845-0.885 microns), and six visible channels (0.402-0.422, 0.433-0.453, 0.480-0.50, 0.51-0.53, 0.555-0.575, and 0.655-0.675 microns). The OCTS will provide data in a swath 1,400 km (870 mi) wide with a ground resolution of 700 m (2,300 ft). OCTS realtime data was transmitted on 465.0 MHz at 20 kbs to local users (e.g. fishing industry).

=== Polarization and Directionality of the Earth's Reflectance (POLDER) ===
The POLDER instrument is provided by the Laboratoire d'Études et de Recherches en Télédétection Spatiale (LERTS)/Centre National d'Études Spatiales (CNES) of France for ADEOS. The objective of POLDER was to observe the Earth's radiation budget under different view angles and polarizations to study the optical and physical properties of clouds and the interactions of solar radiation with the Earth atmosphere system. POLDER was equipped with a wide angle objective taking two dimensional images at various wavelengths in the visible and near-infrared at different polarizations. The instrument will use a CCD matrix to take images at nadir at different view angles as the image moved along the orbit track. A rotating filter wheel and polarizers will produce measurements in eight spectral bands at three different polarization directions (0.435, 0.670, and 0.880 microns at 3 polarization directions and 0.49, 0.52, 0.565, 0.765, and 0.95 microns at no polarization). The POLDER produced images in a swath width of 1,440 × 1,920 km (890 × 1,190 mi) at a ground resolution of 6 × 7 km (3.7 × 4.3 mi).

=== Retroreflector in Space (RIS) ===
The RIS experiment is provided by the Environment Agency (EA) of Japan on ADEOS. The RIS is a 50 cm (20 in) diameter passive corner cube laser retroreflector designed to provide data to infer the distribution of ozone and other trace gases in the atmosphere. A ground-based laser beam is reflected by the RIS to the ground station and the constituent gases derived from the spectral response. A differential type laser radar system was used to eliminate the attenuating effects of the atmosphere.

=== Total Ozone Mapping Spectrometer (TOMS) ===
The TOMS instrument, developed by NASA/GSFC as part of the Mission to Planet Earth (MTPE), was flown on ADEOS. The TOMS instrument continued the long-term measurement of global total-column ozone begun with the TOMS instrument on Nimbus 7 launched in 1978 and the TOMS-2 instrument on the Russian Meteor 3-5 spacecraft launched in 1991. The TOMS instrument was designed to measure total column atmospheric ozone, but also measured global distributions of sulfur dioxide and aerosols due to volcanic eruptions. Ozone concentrations were determined by observing the Earth's albedo at the top of the atmosphere in the ultraviolet (UV) portion of the spectrum using a UV polychromator and photomultiplier (PMT). The TOMS was a single Ebert-Fastie spectrometer with a fixed grating and an array of exit slits. The TOMS step-scanned across the orbital track 51° from the nadir in 3° steps with an FOV of approximately 0.052 rad. At each scan position, the Earth radiance was monitored at six wavelengths (0.304, 0.3125, 0.325, 0.3175, 0.3326, and 0.360 microns) to infer the total ozone amount. The TOMS completed a cross scan in eight seconds, with one second for retrace, to record 37 scenes per scan. At each scene, a chopper sequentially sampled all six wavelengths four times. The TOMS used a PMT and a separate mercury-argon lamp for wavelength calibration and a depolarizer.

== Flight ==
=== Failure ===
On 28 August 1996, the satellite adjusted its attitude to control its orbit. As a result of this maneuver, the solar panel received sunlight from the rear. This caused the solar paddle mast to expand and the panel blanket to contract, placing tension on a soldered joint on the paddle, which eventually broke. The final communication from the satellite was received at 07:21 UTC on 30 June 1997, 9 months after launch.
