= 1991 in spaceflight (January–June) =

This is a list of spaceflights launched between January and June 1991. For launches between July and December, see 1991 in spaceflight (July–December). For an overview of the whole year, see 1991 in spaceflight.

== Orbital launches ==
- ← Jan
- Feb
- Mar
- Apr
- May
- Jun
- Jul
- Aug
- Sep
- Oct
- Nov
- Dec →

Date and time (UTC)	Rocket	Flight number	Launch site		LSP	
Date and time (UTC)	Payload (⚀ = CubeSat)	Operator	Orbit	Function	Decay (UTC)	Outcome
Date and time (UTC)	Remarks					
=== January ===
8 January; 00:53:01	(United States) Delta II (7925)		(United States) Cape Canaveral SLC-17B		(United States) McDonnell Douglas	
8 January; 00:53:01	(United States) NATO-4A	NATO	Geosynchronous	Communication	In orbit	Successful
14 January; 14:50:27	(Soviet Union) Soyuz-U2		(Soviet Union) Baikonur Site 1/5		(Soviet Union) RVSN	
14 January; 14:50:27	(Soviet Union) Progress M-6	MOM	Low Earth, docked to Mir	Resupply Mir	15 March 1991	Successful
15 January; 23:10:49	(European Union) Ariane 4 (44L)		(France) Kourou ELA-2		(France) Arianespace	
15 January; 23:10:49	(Italy) Italsat 1	ASI	Geostationary	Communication	In orbit	Successful
15 January; 23:10:49	(France) Eutelsat 2F2	Eutelsat	Geostationary	Communication	In orbit	Successful
17 January; 10:30	(Soviet Union) Soyuz-U		(Soviet Union) Plesetsk Site 16/2		(Soviet Union) RVSN	
17 January; 10:30	(Soviet Union) Kosmos 2121 (Zenit-8)	MOM	Low Earth	Reconnaissance	10 February 1991	Successful
18 January; 11:34	(Soviet Union) Tsyklon-2		(Soviet Union) Baikonur		(Soviet Union) RVSN	
18 January; 11:34	(Soviet Union) Kosmos 2122 (US-P)	MO SSSR	Low Earth	Naval Reconnaissance	28 March 1993	Successful
29 January; 11:59:58	(Soviet Union) Kosmos-3M		(Soviet Union) Plesetsk Site 133/3		(Soviet Union) RVSN	
29 January; 11:59:58	(Soviet Union) Informator-1	MO SSSR	Low Earth	Communication	In orbit	Successful
=== February ===
5 February; 02:36	(Soviet Union) Kosmos-3M		(Soviet Union) Plesetsk Site 133/3		(Soviet Union) RVSN	
5 February; 02:36	(Soviet Union) Kosmos 2123 (Tsikada)	MO SSSR	Low Earth	Navigation	In orbit	Successful
7 February; 18:15	(Soviet Union) Soyuz-U		(Soviet Union) Plesetsk Site 16		(Soviet Union) RVSN	
7 February; 18:15	(Soviet Union) Kosmos 2124 (Yantar-4K2)	MOM	Low Earth		7 April 1991	Successful
12 February; 02:44	(Soviet Union) Kosmos-3M		(Soviet Union) Plesetsk Site 133/3		(Soviet Union) RVSN	
12 February; 02:44	(Soviet Union) Kosmos 2125 (Strela-1M)	MO SSSR	Low Earth	Communication	In orbit	Successful
12 February; 02:44	(Soviet Union) Kosmos 2126 (Strela-1M)	MO SSSR	Low Earth	Communication	In orbit	Successful
12 February; 02:44	(Soviet Union) Kosmos 2127 (Strela-1M)	MO SSSR	Low Earth	Communication	In orbit	Successful
12 February; 02:44	(Soviet Union) Kosmos 2128 (Strela-1M)	MO SSSR	Low Earth	Communication	In orbit	Successful
12 February; 02:44	(Soviet Union) Kosmos 2129 (Strela-1M)	MO SSSR	Low Earth	Communication	In orbit	Successful
12 February; 02:44	(Soviet Union) Kosmos 2130 (Strela-1M)	MO SSSR	Low Earth	Communication	In orbit	Successful
12 February; 02:44	(Soviet Union) Kosmos 2131 (Strela-1M)	MO SSSR	Low Earth	Communication	In orbit	Successful
12 February; 02:44	(Soviet Union) Kosmos 2132 (Strela-1M)	MO SSSR	Low Earth	Communication	In orbit	Successful
14 February; 08:31:56	(Soviet Union) Proton-K / DM-2		(Soviet Union) Baikonur Site 200/39		(Soviet Union) RVSN	
14 February; 08:31:56	(Soviet Union) Kosmos 2133 (Prognoz)	MOM	Geosynchronous	Missile defence	In orbit	Successful
15 February; 09:30	(Soviet Union) Soyuz-U		(Soviet Union) Baikonur		(Soviet Union) RVSN	
15 February; 09:30	(Soviet Union) Kosmos 2134 (Yantar-1KFT)	MOM	Low Earth	Reconnaissance	1 April 1991	Successful
15 February; 15:19	(Soviet Union) Molniya-M		(Soviet Union) Plesetsk Site 43/3		(Soviet Union) RVSN	
15 February; 15:19	(Soviet Union) Molniya-1-80	MOM	Molniya	Communication	In orbit	Successful
26 February; 04:53:06	(Soviet Union) Kosmos-3M		(Soviet Union) Plesetsk Site 133/3		(Soviet Union) RVSN	
26 February; 04:53:06	(Soviet Union) Kosmos 2135 (Parus)	MO SSSR	Low Earth	Navigation	In orbit	Successful
28 February; 05:30:00	(Soviet Union) Proton-K / DM-2		(Soviet Union) Baikonur Site 81/23		(Soviet Union) RVSN	
28 February; 05:30:00		MOM	Geostationary	Communication	In orbit	Successful
=== March ===
2 March; 23:36:00	(European Union) Ariane 4 (44LP)		(France) Kourou ELA-2		(France) Arianespace	
2 March; 23:36:00	(Luxembourg) Astra 1B	SES Astra	Geosynchronous	Communication	In orbit	Successful
2 March; 23:36:00	(European Union) Meteosat 5	ESA / EUMETSAT	Geosynchronous	Weather	In orbit	Successful
6 March; 15:30	(Soviet Union) Soyuz-U		(Soviet Union) Plesetsk Site 16		(Soviet Union) RVSN	
6 March; 15:30	(Soviet Union) Kosmos 2136 (Zenit-8)	MOM	Low Earth	Reconnaissance	20 March 1991	Successful
8 March; 12:03	(United States) Titan IVA (403A)		(United States) Vandenberg SLC-4E		(United States) US Air Force	
8 March; 12:03	(United States) USA-69 (Lacrosse-2)	NRO	Low Earth	Radar Reconnaissance	In orbit	Successful
8 March; 12:03	First Titan IV launch from Vandenberg AFB; Was one of the oldest operational reconnaissance satellite till 2008.					
8 March; 23:03	(United States) Delta II (6925)		(United States) Cape Canaveral SLC-17B		(United States) McDonnell Douglas	
8 March; 23:03	(United States) Inmarsat 2F2	Inmarsat	Geosynchronous	Communication	In orbit	Successful
12 March; 19:29:04	(Soviet Union) Kosmos-3M		(Soviet Union) Plesetsk Site 133/3		(Soviet Union) RVSN	
12 March; 19:29:04	(Soviet Union) Nadezhda-3	MO SSSR	Low Earth	Navigation	In orbit	Successful
19 March; 13:05:15	(Soviet Union) Soyuz-U2		(Soviet Union) Baikonur Site 1/5		(Soviet Union) RVSN	
19 March; 13:05:15	(Soviet Union) Progress M-7	MOM	Low Earth, docked to Mir	Resupply Mir	7 May 1991	Successful
19 March; 14:30	(Soviet Union) Kosmos-3M		(Soviet Union) Plesetsk Site 132/1		(Soviet Union) RVSN	
19 March; 14:30	(Soviet Union) Kosmos 2137 (Taifun-1)	MO SSSR	Low Earth	Radar calibration	3 April 1995	Successful
22 March; 12:19:59	(Soviet Union) Molniya-M		(Soviet Union) Plesetsk Site 43/4		(Soviet Union) RVSN	
22 March; 12:19:59	(Soviet Union) Molniya-3-55L	MOM	Molniya	Communication	In orbit	Successful
26 March; 13:45	(Soviet Union) Soyuz-U		(Soviet Union) Plesetsk Site 16		(Soviet Union) RVSN	
26 March; 13:45	(Soviet Union) Kosmos 2138 (Yantar-4K2)	MOM	Low Earth	Reconnaissance	24 May 1991	Successful
31 March; 15:12:00	(Soviet Union) Proton-K		(Soviet Union) Baikonur Site 200/40		(Soviet Union) RVSN	
31 March; 15:12:00	(Soviet Union) Almaz-1	MOM	Low Earth	Radar reconnaissance	17 October 1992	Successful
=== April ===
4 April; 10:47:12	(Soviet Union) Proton-K / DM-2		(Soviet Union) Baikonur Site 200/39		(Soviet Union) RVSN	
4 April; 10:47:12	(Soviet Union) Kosmos 2139 (GLONASS)	MOM	Medium Earth	Navigation	In orbit	Successful
4 April; 10:47:12	(Soviet Union) Kosmos 2140 (GLONASS)	MOM	Medium Earth	Navigation	In orbit	Successful
4 April; 10:47:12	(Soviet Union) Kosmos 2141 (GLONASS)	MOM	Medium Earth	Navigation	In orbit	Successful
4 April; 23:33:00	(European Union) Ariane 4 (44P)		(France) Kourou ELA-2		(France) Arianespace	
4 April; 23:33:00	(Canada) Anik E2	Telesat	Geosynchronous	Communication	In orbit	Successful
5 April; 14:22:45	(United States) Space Shuttle Atlantis		(United States) Kennedy LC-39B		(United States) United Space Alliance	
5 April; 14:22:45	(United States) STS-37	NASA	Low Earth	Manned orbital flight	11 April 1991	Successful
5 April; 14:22:45	(United States) Compton Gamma Ray Observatory (CGRO)	NASA	Low Earth	Gamma ray astronomy	4 June 2000	Successful
13 April; 00:09	(United States) Delta II (7925)		(United States) Cape Canaveral SLC-17B		(United States) McDonnell Douglas	
13 April; 00:09	(United States) Spacenet 4	GE Americom	Geostationary	Communication	In orbit	Successful
16 April; 07:21:42	(Soviet Union) Kosmos-3M		(Soviet Union) Plesetsk Site 132/1		(Soviet Union) RVSN	
16 April; 07:21:42	(Soviet Union) Kosmos 2142 (Parus)	MO SSSR	Low Earth	Navigation	In orbit	Successful
18 April; 23:30	(United States) Atlas I		(United States) Cape Canaveral LC-36B		General Dynamics	
18 April; 23:30	(Japan) Yuri 3H	General Dynamics	Intended: Geosynchronous	Communication	T+361 seconds	Failure
18 April; 23:30	Destroyed by RSO after upper stage turbopump malfunction Apogee: 175 kilometres (109 mi)					
24 April; 01:37:00	(Soviet Union) Tsyklon-3		(Soviet Union) Plesetsk		(Soviet Union) RVSN	
24 April; 01:37:00	(Soviet Union) Meteor-3-4	MO SSSR	Low Earth	Weather	In orbit	Successful
28 April; 11:33:14	(United States) Space Shuttle Discovery		(United States) Kennedy LC-39A		(United States) United Space Alliance	
28 April; 11:33:14	(United States) STS-39	NASA	Low Earth	Manned orbital flight	6 May 1991	Successful
28 April; 11:33:14	(United States) IBSS-SPAS (SPAS 02)	SDIO	Low Earth	Missile defence experiments	6 May 1991	Successful
28 April; 11:33:14	(United States) USA-70 (MPEC)	DARPA	Low Earth	Technology	13 May 1991	Successful
28 April; 11:33:14	(United States) CRO-C	SDIO	Low Earth	Chemical release	14 May 1991	Successful
28 April; 11:33:14	(United States) CRO-B	SDIO	Low Earth	Chemical release	12 May 1991	Successful
28 April; 11:33:14	(United States) CRO-A	SDIO	Low Earth	Chemical release	13 May 1991	Successful
=== May ===
14 May; 15:52:03	(United States) Atlas-E		(United States) Vandenberg SLC-3W		(United States) US Air Force	
14 May; 15:52:03	(United States) NOAA-12	NOAA	Low Earth (SSO)	Weather	In orbit	Successful
16 May; 21:40	(Soviet Union) Tsyklon-3		(Soviet Union) Plesetsk		(Soviet Union) RVSN	
16 May; 21:40	(Soviet Union) Kosmos 2143 (Strela-3)	MO SSSR	Low Earth	Communication	In orbit	Successful
16 May; 21:40	(Soviet Union) Kosmos 2144 (Strela-3)	MO SSSR	Low Earth	Communication	In orbit	Successful
16 May; 21:40	(Soviet Union) Kosmos 2145 (Strela-3)	MO SSSR	Low Earth	Communication	In orbit	Successful
16 May; 21:40	(Soviet Union) Kosmos 2146 (Strela-3)	MO SSSR	Low Earth	Communication	In orbit	Successful
16 May; 21:40	(Soviet Union) Kosmos 2147 (Strela-3)	MO SSSR	Low Earth	Communication	In orbit	Successful
16 May; 21:40	(Soviet Union) Kosmos 2148 (Strela-3)	MO SSSR	Low Earth	Communication	In orbit	Successful
18 May; 12:50:28	(Soviet Union) Soyuz-U2		(Soviet Union) Baikonur Site 1/5		(Soviet Union) RVSN	
18 May; 12:50:28	(Soviet Union) Soyuz TM-12	MOM	Low Earth, docked to Mir	Manned orbital flight	10 October 1991	Successful
21 May; 09:00:00	(Soviet Union) Soyuz-U		(Soviet Union) Plesetsk Site 43/4		(Soviet Union) RVSN	
21 May; 09:00:00	(Soviet Union) Resurs-F-10	MOM	Low Earth	Remote sensing	20 June 1991	Successful
24 May; 15:29	(Soviet Union) Soyuz-U		(Soviet Union) Plesetsk Site 43/3		(Soviet Union) RVSN	
24 May; 15:29	(Soviet Union) Kosmos 2149 (Yantar-4K2)	MOM	Low Earth	Reconnaissance	4 July 1991	Successful
29 May; 22:55	(United States) Delta II (7925)		(United States) Cape Canaveral SLC-17B		(United States) McDonnell Douglas	
29 May; 22:55	(United States) Aurora 2	GE Alascom	Geostationary	Communication	In orbit	Successful
30 May; 08:04:03	(Soviet Union) Soyuz-U2		(Soviet Union) Baikonur Site 1/5		(Soviet Union) RVSN	
30 May; 08:04:03	(Soviet Union) Progress M-8	MOM	Low Earth, docked to Mir	Resupply Mir	16 August 1991	Successful
=== June ===
4 June; 08:10:00	(Soviet Union) Tsyklon-3		(Soviet Union) Plesetsk Site 32/2		(Soviet Union) RVSN	
4 June; 08:10:00	(Soviet Union) Okean-3	MOM	Low Earth	Oceanography	In orbit	Successful
5 June; 13:24:51	(United States) Space Shuttle Columbia		(United States) Kennedy LC-39B		(United States) United Space Alliance	
5 June; 13:24:51	(United States) STS-40	NASA	Low Earth	Manned orbital flight	14 June 1991	Successful
5 June; 13:24:51	(United States) SLS-1 (Spacelab)	ESA / NASA	Low Earth	Biological research	In orbit	Successful
11 June; 05:41	(Soviet Union) Kosmos-3M		(Soviet Union) Plesetsk Site 133/3		(Soviet Union) RVSN	
11 June; 05:41	(Soviet Union) Kosmos 2150 (Strela-2M)	MO SSSR	Low Earth	Communication	In orbit	Successful
13 June; 15:41	(Soviet Union) Tsyklon-3		(Soviet Union) Plesetsk		(Soviet Union) RVSN	
13 June; 15:41	(Soviet Union) Kosmos 2151 (Tselina-R)	MO SSSR	Low Earth	ELINT	In orbit	Successful
18 June; 09:09	(Soviet Union) Molniya-M		(Soviet Union) Plesetsk Site 43/4		(Soviet Union) RVSN	
18 June; 09:09	(Soviet Union) Molniya-1-81	MOM	Molniya	Communication	In orbit	Successful
25 June	(Soviet Union) Kosmos-3M		(Soviet Union) Plesetsk Site 132/1		(Soviet Union) RVSN	
25 June	(Soviet Union) Taifun-2-28	MO SSSR	Intended: Low Earth	Radar calibration	25 June 1991	Failure
25 June	Second stage malfunction					
28 June; 08:09:59	(Soviet Union) Soyuz-U		(Soviet Union) Plesetsk Site 43/3		(Soviet Union) RVSN	
28 June; 08:09:59	(Soviet Union) Resurs-F-11	MOM	Low Earth	Remote sensing	21 July 1991	Successful
29 June; 14:00	(United States) Scout G-1		(United States) Vandenberg SLC-5		NASA	
29 June; 14:00	(United States) REX-1 (P89-1A / ISES)	US Air Force / STP	Low Earth (Polar)	Technology demonstration	In orbit	Successful

- ← Jan
- Feb
- Mar
- Apr
- May
- Jun
- Jul
- Aug
- Sep
- Oct
- Nov
- Dec →

== Suborbital launches ==
- ← Jan
- Feb
- Mar
- Apr
- May
- Jun
- Jul
- Aug
- Sep
- Oct
- Nov
- Dec →

Date and time (UTC)	Rocket	Flight number	Launch site		LSP	
Date and time (UTC)	Payload	Operator	Orbit	Function	Decay (UTC)	Outcome
Date and time (UTC)	Remarks					
=== January-March ===
17 January	(Iraq) Al Hussein		Iraq		(Iraq) IQAF	
17 January	(Iraq) High Explosive warhead	IQAF	Sub-orbital	Attack Israel	17 January 1991	Successful
17 January	Apogee: 100 kilometres (62 mi)					
19 January	(Iraq) Al Hussein		Iraq		(Iraq) IQAF	
19 January	(Iraq) High Explosive warhead	IQAF	Sub-orbital	Attack Israel	19 January 1991	Successful
19 January	(Iraq) High Explosive warhead	IQAF	Sub-orbital	Attack Israel	19 January 1991	Successful
19 January	(Iraq) High Explosive warhead	IQAF	Sub-orbital	Attack Israel	19 January 1991	Successful
19 January	Apogee: 100 kilometres (62 mi)					
20 January; 18:43	(Iraq) Al Hussein		Iraq		(Iraq) IQAF	
20 January; 18:43	(Iraq) High Explosive warhead	IQAF	Sub-orbital	Attack Dhahran	20 January 1991	Successful
20 January; 18:43	(Iraq) High Explosive warhead	IQAF	Sub-orbital	Attack Dhahran	20 January 1991	Successful
20 January; 18:43	Apogee: 100 kilometres (62 mi)					
21 January; 08:29	(Iraq) Al Hussein		Iraq		(Iraq) IQAF	
21 January; 08:29	(Iraq) High Explosive warhead	IQAF	Sub-orbital	Attack Dhahran	21 January 1991	Successful
21 January; 08:29	(Iraq) High Explosive warhead	IQAF	Sub-orbital	Attack Dhahran	21 January 1991	Successful
21 January; 08:29	Apogee: 100 kilometres (62 mi)					
21 January; 09:42	(Iraq) Al Hussein		Iraq		(Iraq) IQAF	
21 January; 09:42	(Iraq) High Explosive warhead	IQAF	Sub-orbital	Attack Riyadh	21 January 1991	Successful
21 January; 09:42	(Iraq) High Explosive warhead	IQAF	Sub-orbital	Attack Riyadh	21 January 1991	Successful
21 January; 09:42	(Iraq) High Explosive warhead	IQAF	Sub-orbital	Attack Riyadh	21 January 1991	Successful
21 January; 09:42	(Iraq) High Explosive warhead	IQAF	Sub-orbital	Attack Riyadh	21 January 1991	Successful
21 January; 09:42	Apogee: 100 kilometres (62 mi)					
21 January; 19:18	(Iraq) Al Hussein		Iraq		(Iraq) IQAF	
21 January; 19:18	(Iraq) High Explosive warhead	IQAF	Sub-orbital	Attack Al Jubayl	21 January 1991	Successful
21 January; 19:18	Apogee: 100 kilometres (62 mi)					
22 January; 00:41	(Iraq) Al Hussein		Iraq		(Iraq) IQAF	
22 January; 00:41	(Iraq) High Explosive warhead	IQAF	Sub-orbital	Attack Riyadh	22 January 1991	Successful
22 January; 00:41	(Iraq) High Explosive warhead	IQAF	Sub-orbital	Attack Riyadh	22 January 1991	Successful
22 January; 00:41	(Iraq) High Explosive warhead	IQAF	Sub-orbital	Attack Riyadh	22 January 1991	Successful
22 January; 00:41	Apogee: 100 kilometres (62 mi); Aimed at US Air Force base, intercepted by Patriot ABM, warhead fell on a civilian neighbourhood.					
22 January; 04:10	(Iraq) Al Hussein		Iraq		(Iraq) IQAF	
22 January; 04:10	(Iraq) High Explosive warhead	IQAF	Sub-orbital	Attack Dhahran	22 January 1991	Successful
22 January; 04:10	(Iraq) High Explosive warhead	IQAF	Sub-orbital	Attack Dhahran	22 January 1991	Successful
22 January; 04:10	(Iraq) High Explosive warhead	IQAF	Sub-orbital	Attack Dhahran	22 January 1991	Successful
22 January; 04:10	Apogee: 100 kilometres (62 mi); Aimed at US Air Force base. Intercepted by Patriot ABM, but still hit target.					
22 January	(Iraq) Al Hussein		Iraq		(Iraq) IQAF	
22 January	(Iraq) High Explosive warhead	IQAF	Sub-orbital	Attack Israel	22 January 1991	Successful
22 January	Apogee: 100 kilometres (62 mi)					
22 January	(China) Zhinui 3		(China) Haikou Space Centre, Hainan		(China) CALT	
22 January		CALT	Sub-orbital	Test flight	22 January 1991	Successful
22 January	Apogee: 120 kilometres (75 mi)					
23 January; 19:54	(Iraq) Al Hussein		Iraq		(Iraq) IQAF	
23 January; 19:54	(Iraq) High Explosive warhead	IQAF	Sub-orbital	Attack Dhahran	23 January 1991	Successful
23 January; 19:54	(Iraq) High Explosive warhead	IQAF	Sub-orbital	Attack Dhahran	23 January 1991	Successful
23 January; 19:54	(Iraq) High Explosive warhead	IQAF	Sub-orbital	Attack Riyadh	23 January 1991	Successful
23 January; 19:54	(Iraq) High Explosive warhead	IQAF	Sub-orbital	Attack Riyadh	23 January 1991	Successful
23 January; 19:54	(Iraq) High Explosive warhead	IQAF	Sub-orbital	Attack Israel	23 January 1991	Successful
23 January; 19:54	Apogee: 100 kilometres (62 mi)					
25 January; 19:23	(Iraq) Al Hussein		Iraq		(Iraq) IQAF	
25 January; 19:23	(Iraq) High Explosive warhead	IQAF	Sub-orbital	Attack Riyadh	25 January 1991	Successful
25 January; 19:23	(Iraq) High Explosive warhead	IQAF	Sub-orbital	Attack Riyadh	25 January 1991	Successful
25 January; 19:23	Apogee: 100 kilometres (62 mi); Aimed at Coalition headquarters, intercepted by Patriot ABM, hit Saudi Department of Interior.					
25 January	(Iraq) Al Hussein		Iraq		(Iraq) IQAF	
25 January	(Iraq) High Explosive warhead	IQAF	Sub-orbital	Attack Israel	25 January 1991	Successful
25 January	Apogee: 100 kilometres (62 mi)					
26 January; 00:28	(Iraq) Al Hussein		Iraq		(Iraq) IQAF	
26 January; 00:28	(Iraq) High Explosive warhead	IQAF	Sub-orbital	Attack Dhahran	26 January 1991	Successful
26 January; 00:28	Apogee: 100 kilometres (62 mi)					
26 January; 06:25	(Canada) Black Brant IX		(United States) White Sands LC-36		(United States) NASA	
26 January; 06:25		NASA / JHU	Sub-orbital	Ultraviolet Astronomy	26 January 1991	Successful
26 January; 06:25	Apogee: 300 kilometres (190 mi)					
26 January; 19:46	(Iraq) Al Hussein		Iraq		(Iraq) IQAF	
26 January; 19:46	(Iraq) High Explosive warhead	IQAF	Sub-orbital	Attack Riyadh	26 January 1991	Successful
26 January; 19:46	Apogee: 100 kilometres (62 mi)					
26 January	(Iraq) Al Hussein		Iraq		(Iraq) IQAF	
26 January	(Iraq) High Explosive warhead	IQAF	Sub-orbital	Attack Israel	26 January 1991	Successful
26 January	Apogee: 100 kilometres (62 mi)					
28 January; 17:55	(Iraq) Al Hussein		Iraq		(Iraq) IQAF	
28 January; 17:55	(Iraq) High Explosive warhead	IQAF	Sub-orbital	Attack Riyadh	28 January 1991	Successful
28 January; 17:55	Apogee: 100 kilometres (62 mi); Aimed at downtown Riyadh, intercepted by Patriot ABM, debris damaged a farm.					
28 January; 18:24:24	(United States) ERIS		(Marshall Islands) Meck Island, Kwajalein Atoll		(United States) US Air Force	
28 January; 18:24:24	(United States) ERIS	US Air Force	Sub-orbital	Interceptor test	28 January 1991	Successful
28 January; 18:24:24	Apogee: 270 kilometres (170 mi); Intercepted Aries rocket					
28 January; 18:03:00	(United States) Minuteman IB		(United States) Vandenberg LF-03		(United States) US Air Force	
28 January; 18:03:00		US Air Force	Sub-orbital	Target	28 January 1991	Successful
28 January; 18:03:00	Apogee: 1,300 kilometres (810 mi)					
2 February, 21:41	(Iraq) Al Hussein		Iraq		(Iraq) IQAF	
2 February, 21:41	(Iraq) High Explosive warhead	IQAF	Sub-orbital	Attack Riyadh	2 February 1991	Successful
2 February, 21:41	Apogee: 100 kilometres (62 mi)					
2 February	(Iraq) Al Hussein		Iraq		(Iraq) IQAF	
2 February	(Iraq) High Explosive warhead	IQAF	Sub-orbital	Attack Israel	2 February 1991	Successful
2 February	(Iraq) High Explosive warhead	IQAF	Sub-orbital	Attack Israel	2 February 1991	Successful
6 February; 07:29	(United States) LCLV		(United States) Wallops Island		(United States) Orbital Sciences	
6 February; 07:29		NRL	Sub-orbital	Plasma research	6 February 1991	Successful
6 February; 07:29	Apogee: 510 kilometres (320 mi)					
6 February; 17:30	(Soviet Union) MR-12		(Soviet Union) Kapustin Yar		(Soviet Union) MO SSSR	
6 February; 17:30		MO SSSR	Sub-orbital	Plasma research	6 February 1991	Successful
6 February; 17:30	Apogee: 150 kilometres (93 mi)					
7 February; 08:15	(Soviet Union) RT-2PM Topol		(Soviet Union) Plesetsk		(Soviet Union) RVSN	
7 February; 08:15		RVSN	Sub-orbital	Missile test	7 February 1991	Successful
7 February; 08:15	Apogee: 1,000 kilometres (620 mi)					
7 February; 22:54	(Iraq) Al Hussein		Iraq		(Iraq) IQAF	
7 February; 22:54	(Iraq) High Explosive warhead	IQAF	Sub-orbital	Attack Riyadh	7 February 1991	Successful
11 February; 19:20	(Iraq) Al Hussein		Iraq		(Iraq) IQAF	
11 February; 19:20	(Iraq) High Explosive warhead	IQAF	Sub-orbital	Attack Riyadh	11 February 1991	Successful
11 February; 19:20	Apogee: 100 kilometres (62 mi)					
11 February	(India) Prithvi		(India) Sriharikota		(India) DRDL	
11 February		DRDL	Sub-orbital	Missile test	11 February 1991	Successful
11 February	Apogee: 100 kilometres (62 mi)					
12 February; 03:29	(Japan) S-520		(Norway) Andøya		(Japan) ISAS	
12 February; 03:29		ISAS	Sub-orbital	Auroral	12 February 1991	Successful
12 February; 03:29	Apogee: 353 kilometres (219 mi)					
12 February; 09:11:54	(Canada) Black Brant XII		(United States) Poker Flat		(United States) NASA	
12 February; 09:11:54	(United States) TOPAZ-3	NASA	Sub-orbital	Plasma research	12 February 1991	Successful
12 February; 09:11:54	Apogee: 1,000 kilometres (620 mi)					
14 February; 08:45	(Iraq) Al Hussein		Iraq		(Iraq) IQAF	
14 February; 08:45	(Iraq) High Explosive warhead	IQAF	Sub-orbital	Attack King Khalid Military City	14 February 1991	Successful
14 February; 08:45	(Iraq) High Explosive warhead	IQAF	Sub-orbital	Attack Hafir Al Batin	14 February 1991	Successful
14 February; 08:45	Apogee: 100 kilometres (62 mi), hit King Khalid Military City.					
15 February; 23:01	(Iraq) Al Hussein		Iraq		(Iraq) IQAF	
15 February; 23:01	(Iraq) High Explosive warhead	IQAF	Sub-orbital	Attack Al Jubayl	15 February 1991	Successful
15 February; 23:01	Apogee: 100 kilometres (62 mi)					
16 February; 13:00	(Japan) S-520		(Japan) Kagoshima LA-K		(Japan) ISAS	
16 February; 13:00		ISAS	Sub-orbital	Ultraviolet Astronomy	16 February 1991	Successful
16 February; 13:00	Apogee: 337 kilometres (209 mi)					
18 February; 14:30	(United States) Strypi-XI		(United States) Barking Sands LC-1		(United States) SDIO	
18 February; 14:30	(United States) Bow Shock 2	SDIO	Sub-orbital	Reentry Test	18 February 1991	Successful
18 February; 14:30	Apogee: 120 kilometres (75 mi)					
21 February; 14:06	(Iraq) Al Hussein		Iraq		(Iraq) IQAF	
21 February; 14:06	(Iraq) High Explosive warhead	IQAF	Sub-orbital	Attack King Khalid Military City	21 February 1991	Successful
21 February; 14:06	(Iraq) High Explosive warhead	IQAF	Sub-orbital	Attack King Khalid Military City	21 February 1991	Successful
21 February; 14:06	Apogee: 100 kilometres (62 mi)					
21 February; 18:00	(Iraq) Al Hussein		Iraq		(Iraq) IQAF	
21 February; 18:00	(Iraq) High Explosive warhead	IQAF	Sub-orbital	Attack King Khalid Military City	21 February 1991	Successful
21 February; 18:00	Apogee: 100 kilometres (62 mi)					
21 February; 23:31	(Iraq) Al Hussein		Iraq		(Iraq) IQAF	
21 February; 23:31	(Iraq) High Explosive warhead	IQAF	Sub-orbital	Attack Bahrain	21 February 1991	Successful
21 February; 23:31	Apogee: 100 kilometres (62 mi)					
22 February; 19:46	(Canada) Black Brant IX		(United States) White Sands LC-36		(United States) NASA	
22 February; 19:46		NASA	Sub-orbital	Solar research	22 February 1991	Successful
22 February; 19:46	Apogee: 300 kilometres (190 mi)					
23 February; 01:59	(Iraq) Al Hussein		Iraq		(Iraq) IQAF	
23 February; 01:59	(Iraq) High Explosive warhead	IQAF	Sub-orbital	Attack Dhahran	23 February 1991	Successful
23 February; 01:59	(Iraq) High Explosive warhead	IQAF	Sub-orbital	Attack Dhahran	23 February 1991	Successful
23 February; 01:59	Apogee: 100 kilometres (62 mi)					
24 February; 01:32	(Iraq) Al Hussein		Iraq		(Iraq) IQAF	
24 February; 01:32	(Iraq) High Explosive warhead	IQAF	Sub-orbital	Attack Riyadh	24 February 1991	Successful
24 February; 01:32	Apogee: 100 kilometres (62 mi); Aimed at Coalition headquarters, intercepted by Patriot ABM, debris fell on a school.					
24 February; 06:23	(Iraq) Al Hussein		Iraq		(Iraq) IQAF	
24 February; 06:23	(Iraq) High Explosive warhead	IQAF	Sub-orbital	Attack Riyadh	24 February 1991	Successful
24 February; 06:23	Apogee: 100 kilometres (62 mi)					
24 February; 09:17	(Iraq) Al Hussein		Iraq		(Iraq) IQAF	
24 February; 09:17	(Iraq) High Explosive warhead	IQAF	Sub-orbital	Attack Riyadh	24 February 1991	Successful
24 February; 09:17	Apogee: 100 kilometres (62 mi)					
24 February	(Iraq) Al Hussein		Iraq		(Iraq) IQAF	
24 February	(Iraq) High Explosive warhead	IQAF	Sub-orbital	Attack Israel	24 February 1991	Successful
24 February	Apogee: 100 kilometres (62 mi)					
25 February; 17:32	(Iraq) Al Hussein		Iraq		(Iraq) IQAF	
25 February; 17:32	(Iraq) High Explosive warhead	IQAF	Sub-orbital	Attack Dhahran	25 February 1991	Successful
25 February; 17:32	Apogee: 100 kilometres (62 mi); Hit US Army barracks, killing 28 and injuring 110.					
25 February; 22:26	(Iraq) Al Hussein		Iraq		(Iraq) IQAF	
25 February; 22:26	(Iraq) High Explosive warhead	IQAF	Sub-orbital	Attack Qatar	25 February 1991	Successful
25 February; 22:26	Apogee: 100 kilometres (62 mi)					
February	(Iraq) Al Hussein		Iraq		(Iraq) IQAF	
February	(Iraq) High Explosive warhead	IQAF	Sub-orbital	Attack Israel	Within an hour of launch	Successful
February	(Iraq) High Explosive warhead	IQAF	Sub-orbital	Attack Israel	Within an hour of launch	Successful
February	(Iraq) High Explosive warhead	IQAF	Sub-orbital	Attack Israel	Within an hour of launch	Successful
February	Apogee: 100 kilometres (62 mi)					
12 March	(United States) LGM-118 Peacekeeper		(United States) Vandenberg LF-02		(United States) US Air Force	
12 March		US Air Force	Sub-orbital	Operational test flight	12 March 1991	Successful
12 March	Apogee: 1,000 kilometres (620 mi)					
18 March; 10:15	(Canada) Black Brant IX		(United States) White Sands LC-36		(United States) NASA	
18 March; 10:15	(United States) SXT	NASA / University of Colorado, Boulder	Sub-orbital	X-ray astronomy	18 March 1991	Successful
18 March; 10:15	Apogee: 300 kilometres (190 mi)					
19 March	(United States) UGM-96 Trident I (Trident C-4)		(United States) Submarine, WTR		(United States) US Navy	
19 March		US Navy	Sub-orbital	Operational test flight	19 March 1991	Successful
19 March		US Navy	Sub-orbital	Operational test flight	19 March 1991	Successful
19 March	Apogee: 1,000 kilometres (620 mi)					
23 March; 07:00	(Canada) Black Brant IX		(United States) White Sands LC-36		(United States) NASA	
23 March; 07:00	(United States) MAMA	NASA	Sub-orbital	Ultraviolet Astronomy	23 March 1991	Successful
23 March; 07:00	Apogee: 300 kilometres (190 mi)					
30 March; 02:27	(Canada) Black Brant IX		(United States) White Sands LC-36		(United States) NASA	
30 March; 02:27		NASA	Sub-orbital	Aeronomy	30 March 1991	Successful
30 March; 02:27	Apogee: 300 kilometres (190 mi)					
=== April-June ===
5 April; 14:05	(Soviet Union) RT-2PM Topol		(Soviet Union) Plesetsk		(Soviet Union) RVSN	
5 April; 14:05		RVSN	Sub-orbital	Missile test	5 April 1991	Successful
5 April; 14:05	Apogee: 1,000 kilometres (620 mi)					
9 April; 17:50	(United Kingdom) Skylark 7		(Sweden) Esrange LA-S		(Germany) DLR	
9 April; 17:50	(United Kingdom) SISSI-4	DLR	Sub-orbital	Aeronomy	9 April 1991	Successful
9 April; 17:50	Apogee: 245 kilometres (152 mi)					
9 April; 18:18	(Germany) Viper 3A		(Sweden) Esrange		(Germany) DLR	
9 April; 18:18	(United States) PMSE	DLR	Sub-orbital	Aeronomy	9 April 1991	Successful
9 April; 18:18	Apogee: 110 kilometres (68 mi)					
9 April; 19:20	(Germany) Viper 3A		(Sweden) Esrange		(Germany) DLR	
9 April; 19:20	(United States) PMSE	DLR	Sub-orbital	Aeronomy	9 April 1991	Successful
9 April; 19:20	Apogee: 110 kilometres (68 mi)					
12 April	(United States) HPB		(United States) Wallops Island		(United States) Orbital Sciences	
12 April		Orbital Sciences	Sub-orbital	Target	12 April 1991	Successful
12 April	Apogee: 400 kilometres (250 mi)					
15 April; 22:10	(United States) UGM-133 Trident II (Trident D-5)		(United States) USS West Virginia, ETR		(United States) US Navy	
15 April; 22:10	(United States) DASO-6	US Navy	Sub-orbital	Operational test flight	15 April 1991	Successful
15 April; 22:10	Apogee: 1,000 kilometres (620 mi)					
17 April; 07:46	(Canada) Black Brant 10CM1		(United States) Wallops Island		(United States) SDIO	
17 April; 07:46	(United States) SPFE-2	SDIO	Sub-orbital	Technology demonstration	17 April 1991	Successful
17 April; 07:46	Apogee: 300 kilometres (190 mi)					
18 April; 18:33	(United States) MGM-134 Midgetman		(United States) Vandenberg TP-01		(United States) US Air Force	
18 April; 18:33		US Air Force	Sub-orbital	Missile test	18 April 1991	Successful
18 April; 18:33	Final flight of the Midgetman; Apogee: 1,000 kilometres (620 mi)					
25 April; 18:00	(United States) Nike Orion		(United States) Poker Flat		(United States) NASA	
25 April; 18:00	(United States) CWAS-19	NASA	Sub-orbital	Aeronomy	25 April 1991	Successful
25 April; 18:00	Apogee: 140 kilometres (87 mi)					
29 April	(Brazil) Sonda-3		(Brazil) Barreira do Inferno		(Brazil) IAE	
29 April		INPE	Sub-orbital	Ionospheric research	29 April 1991	Successful
29 April	Apogee: 441 kilometres (274 mi)					
30 April; 19:19	(United States) Nike Orion		(United States) Poker Flat		(United States) NASA	
30 April; 19:19	(United States) CWAS-20	NASA	Sub-orbital	Aeronomy	30 April 1991	Failure
30 April; 19:19	Apogee: 10 kilometres (6.2 mi)					
4 May; 04:10	(Canada) Black Brant IX		(United States) White Sands LC-36		(United States) NASA	
4 May; 04:10	(United States) JASPR-I	NASA	Sub-orbital	Ultraviolet Astronomy	4 May 1991	Successful
4 May; 04:10	Apogee: 300 kilometres (190 mi)					
7 May; 18:05	(Canada) Black Brant IX		(United States) White Sands LC-36		(United States) NASA	
7 May; 18:05	(United States) SERTS-4	NASA	Sub-orbital	Solar research	7 May 1991	Successful
7 May; 18:05	Apogee: 300 kilometres (190 mi)					
8 May; 03:54:00	(Europe) (United States) Maxus		(Sweden) Esrange		(Sweden) SSC	
8 May; 03:54:00		SSC	Sub-orbital	Microgravity	8 May 1991	Failure
8 May; 03:54:00	Apogee: 157 kilometres (98 mi)					
10 May	(United States) UGM-96 Trident I (Trident C-4)		(United States) USS Mariano G. Vallejo, ETR		(United States) US Navy	
10 May	(United States) FCET	US Navy	Sub-orbital	Operational test flight	10 May 1991	Successful
10 May	FCET	US Navy	Sub-orbital	Operational test flight	10 May 1991	Successful
10 May	Apogee: 1,000 kilometres (620 mi)					
11 May; 20:40	(United States) Minuteman IB		(United States) Vandenberg LF-03		(United States) US Air Force	
11 May; 20:40		US Air Force	Sub-orbital	Target	11 May 1991	Successful
11 May; 20:40	Apogee: 1,300 kilometres (810 mi); Interceptor launch scrubbed					
13 May; 19:03	(Canada) Black Brant IX		(United States) White Sands LC-36		(United States) NASA	
13 May; 19:03	(United States) MSSTA-I	NASA	Sub-orbital	X-ray astronomy	13 May 1991	Successful
13 May; 19:03	Apogee: 230 kilometres (140 mi)					
20 May; 07:30	(United States) Aries		(United States) White Sands LC-36		(United States) NASA	
20 May; 07:30	(United States) SXT (XOGS)	NASA	Sub-orbital	X-ray astronomy	20 May 1991	Successful
20 May; 07:30	Apogee: 300 kilometres (190 mi)					
28 May; 12:05	(Soviet Union) R-36MUTTH (SS-18 Mod 4)		(Soviet Union) Baikonur		(Soviet Union) RVSN	
28 May; 12:05		(Soviet Union) RVSN	Sub-orbital	Operational test flight	28 May 1991	Successful
28 May; 12:05	Apogee: 1,000 kilometres (620 mi)					
May	(North Korea) Hwasong-6		(North Korea) Qom		(North Korea) DPRK	
May		(North Korea) DPRK	Sub-orbital	Missile test	Within an hour of launch	Successful
May	Apogee: 200 kilometres (120 mi)					
11 June; 17:47	(United States) LGM-118 Peacekeeper		(United States) Vandenberg LF-08		(United States) US Air Force	
11 June; 17:47		US Air Force	Sub-orbital	Operational test flight	11 June 1991	Successful
11 June; 17:47	Apogee: 1,000 kilometres (620 mi)					
18 June; 11:34	(United States) Prospector		(United States) Cape Canaveral LC-20		(United States) Orbital Sciences	
18 June; 11:34		Orbital Sciences	Sub-orbital	Microgravity	18 June 1991	Failure
18 June; 11:34	Apogee: 1 kilometre (0.62 mi)					
21 June	(United States) Minuteman IB		(United States) Vandenberg LF-03		(United States) US Air Force	
21 June		US Air Force	Sub-orbital	Re-entry vehicle test	21 June 1991	Successful
21 June	Apogee: 1,300 kilometres (810 mi)					
24 June	(France) SSBS S3		(France) Biscarrosse BLB		(France) DMA	
24 June		DMA	Sub-orbital	Operational test flight	24 June 1991	Successful
24 June	Apogee: 1,000 kilometres (620 mi)					
25 June; 17:00	(Soviet Union) RT-2PM Topol		(Soviet Union) Plesetsk		(Soviet Union) RVSN	
25 June; 17:00		RVSN	Sub-orbital	Missile test	25 June 1991	Successful
25 June; 17:00	Apogee: 1,000 kilometres (620 mi)					
26 June; 02:39	(United States) Minuteman III		(United States) Vandenberg LF-26		(United States) US Air Force	
26 June; 02:39	(United States) GT-144GB	US Air Force	Sub-orbital	Operational test flight	26 June 1991	Successful
26 June; 02:39	Apogee: 1,300 kilometres (810 mi)					

- ← Jan
- Feb
- Mar
- Apr
- May
- Jun
- Jul
- Aug
- Sep
- Oct
- Nov
- Dec →
