= 1991 in spaceflight (July–December) =

This is a list of spaceflights launched between July and December 1991. For launches between January and June, see 1991 in spaceflight (January–June). For an overview of the whole year, see 1991 in spaceflight.

== Orbital launches ==
- ← Jan
- Feb
- Mar
- Apr
- May
- Jun
- Jul
- Aug
- Sep
- Oct
- Nov
- Dec →

Date and time (UTC)	Rocket	Flight number	Launch site		LSP	
Date and time (UTC)	Payload (⚀ = CubeSat)	Operator	Orbit	Function	Decay (UTC)	Outcome
Date and time (UTC)	Remarks					
=== July ===
1 July; 21:53:00	(Soviet Union) Proton-K / DM-2		(Soviet Union) Baikonur Site 200/39		(Soviet Union) RVSN	
1 July; 21:53:00	(Soviet Union) Gorizont-23	MOM	Geostationary	Communication	In orbit	Successful
4 July; 02:32:00	(United States) Delta II (7925)		(United States) Cape Canaveral SLC-17A		(United States) McDonnell Douglas	
4 July; 02:32:00	(United States) USA-71 (GPS IIA-2)	US Air Force	Medium Earth	Navigation	In orbit	Successful
4 July; 02:32:00	(United States) Losat-X	SDIO	Low Earth	Navigation	15 November 1991	Failure
4 July; 02:32:00	Losat-X Command receiver failed nine days after launch					
9 July; 09:40	(Soviet Union) Soyuz-U		(Soviet Union) Plesetsk Site 43/4		(Soviet Union) RVSN	
9 July; 09:40	(Soviet Union) Kosmos 2152 (Zenit-8)	MOM	Low Earth	Reconnaissance	23 July 1991	Successful
10 July; 14:00	(Soviet Union) Soyuz-U		(Soviet Union) Baikonur Site 31/6		(Soviet Union) RVSN	
10 July; 14:00	(Soviet Union) Kosmos 2153 (Yantar-4KS1M)	MOM	Low Earth	Reconnaissance	13 March 1992	Successful
17 July; 01:46:31	(European Union) Ariane 4 (40)		(France) Kourou ELA-2		(France) Arianespace	
17 July; 01:46:31	(European Union) ERS-1	ESA	Low Earth (Sun-synchronous)	Remote sensing	In orbit	Successful
17 July; 01:46:31	(European Union) Orbcomm-X	Orbcomm	Low Earth	Technology demonstration	In orbit	Failure
17 July; 01:46:31	(European Union) SARA	ESIEESPACE	Low Earth	Astronomy / Amateur radio	In orbit	Successful
17 July; 01:46:31	(Germany) Tubsat-A	TUB	Low Earth	Technology demonstration	In orbit	Successful
17 July; 01:46:31	(United Kingdom) UoSAT-5	SSTL	Low Earth	Technology demonstration / Amateur radio	In orbit	Successful
17 July; 01:46:31	Orbcomm-X Did not contact ground after separation from carrier rocket					
17 July; 17:33:53	(United States) Pegasus / HAPS		(United States) NB-52, Edwards AFB		(United States) Orbital Sciences	
17 July; 17:33:53	(United States) SCS-1 (Microsat-1)	DARPA	Low Earth	Technology development	23 January 1992	Partial failure
17 July; 17:33:53	(United States) SCS-2 (Microsat-2)	DARPA	Low Earth	Technology development	23 January 1992	Partial failure
17 July; 17:33:53	(United States) SCS-3 (Microsat-3)	DARPA	Low Earth	Technology development	24 January 1992	Partial failure
17 July; 17:33:53	(United States) SCS-4 (Microsat-4)	DARPA	Low Earth	Technology development	23 January 1992	Partial failure
17 July; 17:33:53	(United States) SCS-5 (Microsat-5)	DARPA	Low Earth	Technology development	23 January 1992	Partial failure
17 July; 17:33:53	(United States) SCS-6 (Microsat-6)	DARPA	Low Earth	Technology development	25 January 1992	Partial failure
17 July; 17:33:53	(United States) SCS-7 (Microsat-7)	DARPA	Low Earth	Technology development	23 January 1992	Partial failure
17 July; 17:33:53	Placed in incorrect orbit due to staging error, most mission objectives still met					
23 July; 09:05:00	(Soviet Union) Soyuz-U		(Soviet Union) Plesetsk Site 43/3		(Soviet Union) RVSN	
23 July; 09:05:00	(Soviet Union) Resurs-F-12	MOM	Low Earth	Remote sensing	8 August 1991	Successful
=== August ===
1 August; 11:53	(Soviet Union) Molniya-M		(Soviet Union) Plesetsk Site 43/4		(Soviet Union) RVSN	
1 August; 11:53	(Soviet Union) Molniya-1-82	MOM	Molniya	Communication	9 October 2004	Successful
2 August; 15:02:00	(United States) Space Shuttle Discovery		(United States) Kennedy LC-39A		(United States) United Space Alliance	
2 August; 15:02:00	(United States) STS-48	NASA	Low Earth	Manned orbital flight	11 August 1991	Successful
2 August; 15:02:00	(United States) TDRS-5	NASA	Low Earth	Communication	In orbit	Successful
14 August; 23:15:13	(European Union) Ariane 4 (44L)		(France) Kourou ELA-2		(France) Arianespace	
14 August; 23:15:13	(European Union) Intelsat 605	Intelsat	Geostationary	Communication	In orbit	Successful
15 August; 09:14:59	(Soviet Union) Tsyklon-3		(Soviet Union) Plesetsk		(Soviet Union) RVSN	
15 August; 09:14:59	(Soviet Union) Meteor-3-5	MOM	Low Earth	Weather	In orbit	Successful
20 August; 22:54:10	(Soviet Union) Soyuz-U2		(Soviet Union) Baikonur Site 1/5		(Soviet Union) RVSN	
20 August; 22:54:10	(Soviet Union) Progress M-9	MOM	Low Earth, docked to Mir	Resupply Mir	30 September 1991	Successful
21 August; 10:50:00	(Soviet Union) Soyuz-U		(Soviet Union) Plesetsk Site 43/3		(Soviet Union) RVSN	
21 August; 10:50:00	(Soviet Union) Resurs-F-2	MOM	Low Earth	Remote sensing	20 September 1991	Successful
22 August; 12:35:46	(Soviet Union) Kosmos-3M		(Soviet Union) Plesetsk Site 132/1		(Soviet Union) RVSN	
22 August; 12:35:46	(Soviet Union) Kosmos 2154 (Parus)	MO SSSR	Low Earth	Navigation	In orbit	Successful
25 August; 08:40	(Japan) H-I		(Japan) Tanegashima LA-Y		(Japan) NASDA	
25 August; 08:40	(Japan) BS-3B		Geostationary	Communication	In orbit	Successful
29 August; 06:48:43	(Soviet Union) Vostok-2M		(Soviet Union) Baikonur Site 31/6		(Soviet Union) RVSN	
29 August; 06:48:43	(India) IRS-1B	ISRO	Low Earth (Sun-synchronous)	Remote sensing	In orbit	Successful
29 August; 06:48:43	Final flight of Vostok rocket					
30 August; 02:30	(Japan) Mu-3S-II		(Japan) Kagoshima LA-M1		(Japan) ISAS	
30 August; 02:30	(Japan) Yohkoh (SOLAR-A)	ISAS	Low Earth	Solar research	12 September 2005	Successful
30 August; 08:58:01	(Soviet Union) Zenit-2		(Soviet Union) Baikonur Site 45/1		(Soviet Union) RVSN	
30 August; 08:58:01	(Soviet Union) Tselina-2	MO SSSR	Intended: Low Earth	ELINT	30 August 1991	Failure
30 August; 08:58:01	Second stage overheated, resulting in explosion					
=== September ===
12 September; 23:11:04	(United States) Space Shuttle Discovery		(United States) Kennedy LC-39A		(United States) United Space Alliance	
12 September; 23:11:04	(United States) STS-48	NASA	Low Earth	Manned orbital flight	18 September 1991	Successful
12 September; 23:11:04	(United States) UARS	NASA	Low Earth	Atmospheric research	23 September 2011	Successful
13 September; 17:51:02	(Soviet Union) Proton-K / DM-2		(Soviet Union) Baikonur Site 81/23		(Soviet Union) RVSN	
13 September; 17:51:02	(Soviet Union) Kosmos 2155 (Prognoz)	MOM	Geostationary	Missile defence	In orbit	Successful
17 September; 20:01:59	(Soviet Union) Molniya-M		(Soviet Union) Plesetsk Site 43/4		(Soviet Union) RVSN	
17 September; 20:01:59	(Soviet Union) Molniya-3-48L	MOM	Molniya	Communication	In orbit	Successful
19 September; 16:20	(Soviet Union) Soyuz-U		(Soviet Union) Plesetsk Site 43/3		(Soviet Union) RVSN	
19 September; 16:20	(Soviet Union) Kosmos 2156 (Yantar-4K2)	MOM	Low Earth	Reconnaissance	17 November 1991	Successful
26 September; 23:43:00	(European Union) Ariane 4 (44P)		(France) Kourou ELA-2		(France) Arianespace	
26 September; 23:43:00	(Canada) Anik E1	Telesat	Geosynchronous	Communication	In orbit	Successful
28 September; 07:05	(Soviet Union) Tsyklon-3		(Soviet Union) Plesetsk		(Soviet Union) RVSN	
28 September; 07:05	(Soviet Union) Kosmos 2157 (Strela-3)	MO SSSR	Low Earth	Communication	In orbit	Successful
28 September; 07:05	(Soviet Union) Kosmos 2158 (Strela-3)	MO SSSR	Low Earth	Communication	In orbit	Successful
28 September; 07:05	(Soviet Union) Kosmos 2159 (Strela-3)	MO SSSR	Low Earth	Communication	In orbit	Successful
28 September; 07:05	(Soviet Union) Kosmos 2160 (Strela-3)	MO SSSR	Low Earth	Communication	In orbit	Successful
28 September; 07:05	(Soviet Union) Kosmos 2161 (Strela-3)	MO SSSR	Low Earth	Communication	In orbit	Successful
28 September; 07:05	(Soviet Union) Kosmos 2162 (Strela-3)	MO SSSR	Low Earth	Communication	In orbit	Successful
=== October ===
2 October; 05:59:38	(Soviet Union) Soyuz-U2		(Soviet Union) Baikonur Site 1/5		(Soviet Union) RVSN	
2 October; 05:59:38	(Soviet Union) Soyuz TM-13	MOM	Low Earth, docked to Mir	Manned orbital flight	25 March 1992	Successful
2 October; 05:59:38	Last Soviet manned spaceflight					
4 October; 18:10:00	(Soviet Union) Soyuz-U		(Soviet Union) Plesetsk Site 43/4		(Soviet Union) RVSN	
4 October; 18:10:00	(Soviet Union) Foton-4	MOM	Low Earth	Biological research	20 October 1991	Successful
9 October; 13:15	(Soviet Union) Soyuz-U2		(Soviet Union) Baikonur Site 1/5		(Soviet Union) RVSN	
9 October; 13:15	(Soviet Union) Kosmos 2163 (Orlets)	MOM	Low Earth	Reconnaissance	7 December 1991	Successful
10 October; 14:00	(Soviet Union) Kosmos-3M		(Soviet Union) Plesetsk Site 132/1		(Soviet Union) RVSN	
10 October; 14:00	(Soviet Union) Kosmos 2164 (Taifun-1)	MO SSSR	Low Earth	Radar calibration	12 December 1992	Successful
17 October; 00:05:25	(Soviet Union) Soyuz-U2		(Soviet Union) Baikonur Site 1/5		(Soviet Union) RVSN	
17 October; 00:05:25	(Soviet Union) Progress M-10	MOM	Low Earth, docked to Mir	Resupply Mir	20 January 1992	Successful
23 October; 15:25:00	(Soviet Union) Proton-K / DM-2		(Soviet Union) Baikonur Site 200/39		(Soviet Union) RVSN	
23 October; 15:25:00	(Soviet Union) Gorizont-24	MOM	Geostationary	Communication	In orbit	Successful
29 October; 23:08:08	(European Union) Ariane 4 (44L)		(France) Kourou ELA-2		(France) Arianespace	
29 October; 23:08:08	(Soviet Union) Intelsat 601	Intelsat	Geostationary	Communication	In orbit	Successful
=== November ===
8 November; 07:07	(United States) Titan IVA (403A)		(United States) Vandenberg SLC-4E		(United States) US Air Force	
8 November; 07:07	(United States) USA-72 (SLDCOM-2)	NRO	Medium Earth	Communication	In orbit	Successful
8 November; 07:07	(United States) USA-74 (NOSS-2-2-A)	NRO	Low Earth	Naval Reconnaissance	In orbit	Successful
8 November; 07:07	(United States) USA-76 (NOSS-2-2-B)	NRO	Low Earth	Naval Reconnaissance	In orbit	Successful
8 November; 07:07	(United States) USA-77 (NOSS-2-2-C)	NRO	Low Earth	Naval Reconnaissance	In orbit	Successful
12 November; 20:09	(Soviet Union) Tsyklon-3		(Soviet Union) Plesetsk		(Soviet Union) RVSN	
12 November; 20:09	(Soviet Union) Kosmos 2165 (Strela-3)	MO SSSR	Low Earth	Communication	In orbit	Successful
12 November; 20:09	(Soviet Union) Kosmos 2166 (Strela-3)	MO SSSR	Low Earth	Communication	In orbit	Successful
12 November; 20:09	(Soviet Union) Kosmos 2167 (Strela-3)	MO SSSR	Low Earth	Communication	In orbit	Successful
12 November; 20:09	(Soviet Union) Kosmos 2168 (Strela-3)	MO SSSR	Low Earth	Communication	In orbit	Successful
12 November; 20:09	(Soviet Union) Kosmos 2169 (Strela-3)	MO SSSR	Low Earth	Communication	In orbit	Successful
12 November; 20:09	(Soviet Union) Kosmos 2170 (Strela-3)	MO SSSR	Low Earth	Communication	In orbit	Successful
20 November; 19:15	(Soviet Union) Soyuz-U		(Soviet Union) Plesetsk Site 43/3		(Soviet Union) RVSN	
20 November; 19:15	(Soviet Union) Kosmos 2171 (Yantar-4K2)	MOM	Low Earth	Reconnaissance	17 January 1992	Successful
22 November; 13:27:00	(Soviet Union) Proton-K / DM-2		(Soviet Union) Baikonur Site 81/23		(Soviet Union) RVSN	
22 November; 13:27:00	(Soviet Union) Kosmos 2172 (Potok)	MOM	Geostationary	Communication	In orbit	Successful
24 November; 23:44:00	(United States) Space Shuttle Atlantis		(United States) Kennedy LC-39A		(United States) United Space Alliance	
24 November; 23:44:00	(United States) STS-44	NASA	Low Earth	Manned orbital flight	1 December 1991	Successful
24 November; 23:44:00	(United States) DSP-16	US Air Force	Low Earth	Missile defence	In orbit	Successful
27 November; 03:30:26	(Soviet Union) Kosmos-3M		(Soviet Union) Plesetsk Site 133/3		(Soviet Union) RVSN	
27 November; 03:30:26	(Soviet Union) Kosmos 2173 (Parus)	MO SSSR	Low Earth	Navigation	In orbit	Successful
28 November; 13:23	(United States) Atlas-E		(United States) Vandenberg SLC-3W		(United States) US Air Force	
28 November; 13:23	(United States) USA-73 (DMSP-11)	US Air Force	Low Earth (Sun-synchronous)	Weather	In orbit	Successful
=== December ===
7 December; 22:47	(United States) Atlas II		(United States) Cape Canaveral LC-36B		(United States) General Dynamics	
7 December; 22:47	(France) Eutelsat 2F3	(France) Eutelsat	Geostationary	Communication	In orbit	Successful
16 December; 23:19:48	(European Union) Ariane 4 (44L)		(France) Kourou ELA-2		(France) Arianespace	
16 December; 23:19:48	(United Kingdom) Inmarsat 2F3	Inmarsat	Geostationary	Communication	In orbit	Successful
16 December; 23:19:48	(France) Télécom 2A	France Télécom	Geostationary	Communication	In orbit	Successful
17 December; 11:00	(Soviet Union) Soyuz-U		(Soviet Union) Baikonur Site 31/6		(Soviet Union) RVSN	
17 December; 11:00	(Soviet Union) Kosmos 2174 (Yantar-1KFT)	MOM	Low Earth	Reconnaissance	30 January 1992	Successful
18 December; 03:54:00	(Soviet Union) Tsyklon-3		(Soviet Union) Plesetsk		(Soviet Union) RVSN	
18 December; 03:54:00	(Soviet Union) Interkosmos-25	MOM	Medium Earth	Plasma research	In orbit	Successful
18 December; 03:54:00	(Soviet Union) Maigon-3		Medium Earth	Magnetosphere research	In orbit	Successful
18 December; 03:54:00	Released from Interkosmos-25 on 28 December 1991					
19 December; 11:41:00	(Soviet Union) Proton-K / DM-2		(Soviet Union) Baikonur Site 81/23		(Soviet Union) RVSN	
19 December; 11:41:00	(Soviet Union) Raduga-28	MOM	Geostationary	Communication	In orbit	Successful
19 December; 11:41:00	Last Soviet orbital launch					
28 December; 12:00	(China) Long March 3		(China) Xichang LA-1		(China) CALT	
28 December; 12:00	(China) Chinasat-4	Chinasat	Intended: Geosynchronous; Achieved: Geostationary transfer	Communication	In orbit	Partial failure
28 December; 12:00	Third stage failed to ignite					

- ← Jan
- Feb
- Mar
- Apr
- May
- Jun
- Jul
- Aug
- Sep
- Oct
- Nov
- Dec →

== Suborbital launches ==
- ← Jan
- Feb
- Mar
- Apr
- May
- Jun
- Jul
- Aug
- Sep
- Oct
- Nov
- Dec →

Date and time (UTC)	Rocket	Flight number	Launch site		LSP	
Date and time (UTC)	Payload (⚀ = CubeSat)	Operator	Orbit	Function	Decay (UTC)	Outcome
Date and time (UTC)	Remarks					
=== July-September ===
2 July	(United States) Minuteman III		(United States) Vandenberg LF-10		(United States) US Air Force	
2 July	(United States) GT-143GM	US Air Force	Sub-orbital	Operational test flight	2 July 1991	Successful
2 July	Apogee: 1,300 kilometres (810 mi)					
11 July; 17:25	(Canada) Black Brant IX		(United States) White Sands LC-36		(United States) NASA	
11 July; 17:25		NASA	Sub-orbital	Solar Ultraviolet Astronomy	11 July 1991	Successful
11 July; 17:25	Apogee: 300 kilometres (190 mi)					
26 July	(Soviet Union) 79M6 Kontakt		(Soviet Union) MiG-31D, near the Lake Balkhash			
26 July	(Soviet Union)		Suborbital	ASAT missile test	26 July	
26 July	Apogee: about 200 km					
29 July	(United States) UGM-133 Trident II (Trident D-5)		(United States) USS Pennsylvania, ETR		(United States) US Navy	
29 July	(United States) CET	US Navy	Sub-orbital	Operational test flight	29 July 1991	Successful
29 July	(United States) CET	US Navy	Sub-orbital	Operational test flight	29 July 1991	Successful
29 July	(United States) CET	US Navy	Sub-orbital	Operational test flight	29 July 1991	Successful
29 July	(United States) CET	US Navy	Sub-orbital	Operational test flight	29 July 1991	Successful
29 July	Apogee: 1,000 kilometres (620 mi)					
July	(North Korea) Hwasong-6		(North Korea) Chiha-ri		(North Korea) DPRK	
July		DPRK	Sub-orbital	Missile test	Within an hour of launch	Successful
July	Apogee: 200 kilometres (120 mi)					
July	(Soviet Union) MR-20		(Soviet Union) RV Professor Zubov, Caribbean		(Soviet Union) MO SSSR	
July		MO SSSR	Sub-orbital	Aeronomy	Within an hour of launch	Successful
July		MO SSSR	Sub-orbital	Aeronomy	Within an hour of launch	Successful
July		MO SSSR	Sub-orbital	Aeronomy	Within an hour of launch	Successful
July		MO SSSR	Sub-orbital	Aeronomy	Within an hour of launch	Successful
July	Apogee: 250 kilometres (160 mi)					
1 August; 01:40:00	(United States) Nike Orion		(Sweden) Esrange		(Germany) DLR	
1 August; 01:40:00	(Germany) TURBO-B	DLR	Sub-orbital	Aeronomy	1 August 1991	Successful
1 August; 01:40:00	Apogee: 130 kilometres (81 mi)					
1 August; 01:54:00	(United States) Viper 3A		(Sweden) Esrange		(United States) NASA	
1 August; 01:54:00	(United States) PMSE	NASA	Sub-orbital	Aeronomy	1 August 1991	Successful
1 August; 01:54:00	Apogee: 111 kilometres (69 mi)					
1 August; 02:03:00	(United States) Viper 3A		(Sweden) Esrange		(United States) NASA	
1 August; 02:03:00	(United States) PMSE	NASA	Sub-orbital	Aeronomy	1 August 1991	Successful
1 August; 02:03:00	Apogee: 112 kilometres (70 mi)					
1 August; 02:39:00	(United States) Viper 3A		(Sweden) Esrange		(United States) NASA	
1 August; 02:39:00	(United States) PMSE	NASA	Sub-orbital	Aeronomy	1 August 1991	Successful
1 August; 02:39:00	Apogee: 112 kilometres (70 mi)					
1 August; 02:24:00	(United States) Viper 3A		(Sweden) Esrange		(United States) NASA	
1 August; 02:24:00	(United States) PMSE	DLR	Sub-orbital	Aeronomy	1 August 1991	Successful
1 August; 02:24:00	Apogee: 115 kilometres (71 mi)					
5 August; 23:32:00	(United States) Viper 3A		(Sweden) Esrange		(United States) NASA	
5 August; 23:32:00	(United States) PMSE	NASA	Sub-orbital	Aeronomy	5 August 1991	Successful
5 August; 23:32:00	Apogee: 113 kilometres (70 mi)					
9 August; 22:53:00	(United States) Viper 3A		(Sweden) Esrange		(United States) NASA	
9 August; 22:53:00	(United States) PMSE	NASA	Sub-orbital	Aeronomy	9 August 1991	Successful
9 August; 22:53:00	Apogee: 115 kilometres (71 mi)					
9 August; 22:39:00	(United States) Viper 3A		(Sweden) Esrange		(United States) NASA	
9 August; 22:39:00	(United States) PMSE	NASA	Sub-orbital	Aeronomy	9 August 1991	Failure
9 August; 22:39:00	Apogee: 5 kilometres (3.1 mi)					
9 August; 23:30:20	(Canada) Black Brant VB		(Sweden) Esrange		(United States) NASA	
9 August; 23:30:20	(United States) EFIELD-A	NASA	Sub-orbital	Ionosphere	9 August 1991	Successful
9 August; 23:30:20	Apogee: 101 kilometres (63 mi)					
9 August; 23:15:00	(United States) Nike Orion		(Sweden) Esrange		(Germany) DLR	
9 August; 23:15:00	(Germany) TURBO-A	DLR	Sub-orbital	Aeronomy	9 August 1991	Successful
9 August; 23:15:00	Apogee: 117 kilometres (73 mi)					
9 August; 23:15:15	(United States) Nike Orion		(Sweden) Esrange		(Sweden) SSC	
9 August; 23:15:15	(Sweden) DECIMALS-A	SSC	Sub-orbital	Aeronomy	9 August 1991	Successful
9 August; 23:15:15	Apogee: 117 kilometres (73 mi)					
9 August; 23:40:00	(United States) Nike Orion		(Sweden) Esrange		(United States) NASA	
9 August; 23:40:00	(Sweden) PEP-A	NASA	Sub-orbital	Aeronomy	9 August 1991	Successful
9 August; 23:40:00	Apogee: 117 kilometres (73 mi)					
10 August; 00:06:00	(United States) Viper 3A		(Sweden) Esrange		(United States) NASA	
10 August; 00:06:00	(United States) PMSE	NASA	Sub-orbital	Aeronomy	10 August 1991	Successful
10 August; 00:06:00	Apogee: 101 kilometres (63 mi)					
10 August; 00:24:00	(United States) Viper 3A		(Sweden) Esrange		(Germany) DLR	
10 August; 00:24:00	(United States) PMSE		Sub-orbital	Aeronomy	10 August 1991	Successful
10 August; 00:24:00	Apogee: 115 kilometres (71 mi)					
10 August; 01:37:00	(United States) Nike Orion		(Sweden) Esrange		(Sweden) SSC	
10 August; 01:37:00	(Sweden) DECIMALS-B	SSC	Sub-orbital	Aeronomy	10 August 1991	Successful
10 August; 01:37:00	Apogee: 118 kilometres (73 mi)					
10 August; 01:42:00	(United States) Viper 3A		(Sweden) Esrange		(United States) NASA	
10 August; 01:42:00	(United States) PMSE	NASA	Sub-orbital	Aeronomy	10 August 1991	Successful
10 August; 01:42:00	Apogee: 117 kilometres (73 mi)					
15 August; 12:05	(Soviet Union) UR-100NU		(Soviet Union) Baikonur		(Soviet Union) RVSN	
15 August; 12:05		RVSN	Sub-orbital	Operational test flight	15 August 1991	Successful
15 August; 12:05	Apogee: 1,000 kilometres (620 mi)					
19 August; 22:55	(Soviet Union) RT-2PM Topol		(Soviet Union) Plesetsk		(Soviet Union) RVSN	
19 August; 22:55		RVSN	Sub-orbital	Missile test	19 August 1991	Successful
19 August; 22:55	Apogee: 1,000 kilometres (620 mi)					
20 August; 09:45:48	(United States) Aries		(United States) Cape Canaveral LC-20		(United States) BMDO	
20 August; 09:45:48		BMDO	Sub-orbital	Target	20 August 1991	Failure
20 August; 09:45:48	Apogee: 2 kilometres (1.2 mi)					
30 August	(United States) UGM-133 Trident II (Trident D-5)		(United States) USS Kentucky, ETR		(United States) US Navy	
30 August	(United States) DASO-7	US Navy	Sub-orbital	Operational test flight	30 August 1991	Successful
30 August	Apogee: 1,000 kilometres (620 mi)					
August	(Soviet Union) MR-20		(Soviet Union) Professor Zubov, Caribbean		(Soviet Union) MO SSSR	
August		MO SSSR	Sub-orbital	Aeronomy	Within an hour of launch	Successful
August		MO SSSR	Sub-orbital	Aeronomy	Within an hour of launch	Successful
August		MO SSSR	Sub-orbital	Aeronomy	Within an hour of launch	Successful
August		MO SSSR	Sub-orbital	Aeronomy	Within an hour of launch	Successful
August	Apogee: 250 kilometres (160 mi)					
3 September	(United States) Minuteman III		(United States) Vandenberg LF-04		(United States) US Air Force	
3 September	(United States) GT-145GM	US Air Force	Sub-orbital	Operational test flight	3 September 1991	Successful
3 September	Apogee: 1,300 kilometres (810 mi)					
4 September; 05:50	(United States) Talos-Castor		(United States) Barking Sands		(United States) Sandia	
4 September; 05:50		Sandia	Sub-orbital	Tungsten dust release	4 September 1991	Successful
4 September; 05:50	Apogee: 330 kilometres (210 mi)					
6 September; 21:50	(Canada) Black Brant 8C		(United States) White Sands		(United States) NASA	
6 September; 21:50		NASA	Sub-orbital	Plasma research	6 September 1991	Successful
6 September; 21:50	Apogee: 148 kilometres (92 mi)					
12 September; 05:41	(United States) Talos-Castor		(United States) Barking Sands		(United States) Sandia	
12 September; 05:41		Sandia	Sub-orbital	Target	12 September 1991	Successful
12 September; 05:41	Apogee: 330 kilometres (210 mi)					
12 September; 12:45	(United States) R-36MUTTH (SS-18 Mod 4)		(Soviet Union) Baikonur		(Soviet Union) RVSN	
12 September; 12:45		RVSN	Sub-orbital	Operational test flight	12 September 1991	Successful
12 September; 12:45	Apogee: 1,000 kilometres (620 mi)					
15 September; 23:00	(Japan) TR-1A		(Japan) Tanegashima		(Japan) NASDA	
15 September; 23:00		NASDA	Sub-orbital	Microgravity	15 September 1991	Successful
15 September; 23:00	Apogee: 270 kilometres (170 mi)					
17 September; 10:20	(Soviet Union) R-36M2 Voevoda (SS-18 Mod 5)		(Soviet Union) Baikonur		(Soviet Union) RVSN	
17 September; 10:20		RVSN	Sub-orbital	Missile test	17 September 1991	Successful
17 September; 10:20	Apogee: 1,000 kilometres (620 mi)					
17 September; 23:43	(United States) Nike Orion		(Norway) Andøya		(Germany) DLR	
17 September; 23:43	(Germany) Turbo-Metal	DLR	Sub-orbital	Aeronomy	17 September 1991	Successful
17 September; 23:43	Apogee: 140 kilometres (87 mi)					
17 September	(United States) LGM-118 Peacekeeper		(United States) Vandenberg LF-02		(United States) US Air Force	
17 September		US Air Force	Sub-orbital	Operational test flight	17 September 1991	Successful
17 September	Apogee: 1,000 kilometres (620 mi)					
20 September; 20:48	(United States) Nike Orion		(Norway) Andøya		(Germany) DLR	
20 September; 20:48	(Germany) Turbo-Metal	DLR	Sub-orbital	Aeronomy	20 September 1991	Successful
20 September; 20:48	Apogee: 140 kilometres (87 mi)					
20 September; 22:40	(United States) Nike Orion		(Norway) Andøya		(Germany) DLR	
20 September; 22:40	(Germany) Turbo-Metal	DLR	Sub-orbital	Aeronomy	20 September 1991	Successful
20 September; 22:40	Apogee: 140 kilometres (87 mi)					
30 September; 20:55:15	(United States) Nike Orion		(Norway) Andøya		(Germany) DLR	
30 September; 20:55:15	(Germany) Turbo-Metal	DLR	Sub-orbital	Aeronomy	30 September 1991	Successful
30 September; 20:55:15	Apogee: 140 kilometres (87 mi)					
September	(Soviet Union) MR-20		(Soviet Union) Professor Zubov, Caribbean		(Soviet Union) MO SSSR	
September		MO SSSR	Sub-orbital	Aeronomy	Within an hour of launch	Successful
September		MO SSSR	Sub-orbital	Aeronomy	Within an hour of launch	Successful
September		MO SSSR	Sub-orbital	Aeronomy	Within an hour of launch	Successful
September		MO SSSR	Sub-orbital	Aeronomy	Within an hour of launch	Successful
September	Apogee: 250 kilometres (160 mi)					
=== October-December ===
2 October; 15:50	(Soviet Union) RT-2PM Topol		(Soviet Union) Plesetsk		(Soviet Union) RVSN	
2 October; 15:50		RVSN	Sub-orbital	Missile test	2 October 1991	Successful
2 October; 15:50	Apogee: 1,000 kilometres (620 mi)					
3 October; 22:27:30	(United States) Nike Orion		(Norway) Andøya		(Germany) DLR	
3 October; 22:27:30	(Germany) Turbo-Metal	DLR	Sub-orbital	Aeronomy	3 October 1991	Successful
3 October; 22:27:30	Apogee: 140 kilometres (87 mi)					
4 October; 00:08	(United States) Nike Orion		(Norway) Andøya		(Germany) DLR	
4 October; 00:08	(Germany) Turbo-Metal	DLR	Sub-orbital	Aeronomy	4 October 1991	Successful
4 October; 00:08	Apogee: 140 kilometres (87 mi)					
10 October; 11:05	(Soviet Union) R-36M2 Voevoda (SS-18 Mod 5)		(Soviet Union) Baikonur		(Soviet Union) RVSN	
10 October; 11:05		RVSN	Sub-orbital	Missile test	10 October 1991	Successful
10 October; 11:05	Apogee: 1,000 kilometres (620 mi)					
14 October; 10:17:20	(United States) Aries		(United States) Cape Canaveral LC-20		(United States) BMDO	
14 October; 10:17:20		BMDO	Sub-orbital	Target	14 October 1991	Successful
14 October; 10:17:20	Apogee: 320 kilometres (200 mi)					
30 October	(Israel) Jericho I		(Israel) Negev Desert		(Israel) IDF	
30 October		IDF	Sub-orbital	Operational test flight	30 October 1991	Successful
30 October	Apogee: 100 kilometres (62 mi)					
October	(Soviet Union) MR-20		(Soviet Union) Professor Zubov, Caribbean		(Soviet Union) MO SSSR	
October		MO SSSR	Sub-orbital	Aeronomy	Within an hour of launch	Successful
October		MO SSSR	Sub-orbital	Aeronomy	Within an hour of launch	Successful
October		MO SSSR	Sub-orbital	Aeronomy	Within an hour of launch	Successful
October		MO SSSR	Sub-orbital	Aeronomy	Within an hour of launch	Successful
October	Apogee: 250 kilometres (160 mi)					
4 November	(United States) UGM-133 Trident II (Trident D-5)		(United States) USS Kentucky, ETR		(United States) US Navy	
4 November	(United States) DASO-8	US Navy	Sub-orbital	Operational test flight	4 November 1991	Successful
4 November	Apogee: 1,000 kilometres (620 mi)					
11 November; 10:19	(United States) Minuteman III		(United States) Vandenberg LF-09		(United States) US Air Force	
11 November; 10:19	(United States) GT-146GM	US Air Force	Sub-orbital	Operational test flight	11 November 1991	Successful
11 November; 10:19	Apogee: 1,300 kilometres (810 mi)					
11 November	(United States) UGM-133 Trident II (Trident D-5)		(United States) USS Pennsylvania, ETR		(United States) US Navy	
11 November	(United States) CET	US Navy	Sub-orbital	Operational test flight	11 November 1991	Successful
11 November	(United States) CET	US Navy	Sub-orbital	Operational test flight	11 November 1991	Successful
11 November	(United States) CET	US Navy	Sub-orbital	Operational test flight	11 November 1991	Successful
11 November	(United States) CET	US Navy	Sub-orbital	Operational test flight	11 November 1991	Successful
11 November	Apogee: 1,000 kilometres (620 mi)					
16 November; 15:30	(Canada) Black Brant 9CM1		(United States) White Sands LC-36		(United States) SSI	
16 November; 15:30	(United States) CONSORT-4	SSI	Sub-orbital	Microgravity	16 November 1991	Successful
16 November; 15:30	Apogee: 298 kilometres (185 mi)					
20 November; 08:05	(Soviet Union) R-36M2 Voevoda (SS-18 Mod 5)		(Soviet Union) Baikonur		(Soviet Union) RVSN	
20 November; 08:05		RVSN	Sub-orbital	Operational test flight	20 November 1991	Successful
20 November; 08:05	Apogee: 1,000 kilometres (620 mi)					
23 November; 09:40	(United Kingdom) Skylark 7		(Sweden) Esrange LA-S		(Germany) MBB	
23 November; 09:40	(Germany) TEXUS-28	MBB	Sub-orbital	Microgravity	23 November 1991	Successful
23 November; 09:40	Apogee: 239 kilometres (149 mi)					
26 November; 02:30	(Soviet Union) UR-100NU		(Soviet Union) Baikonur		(Soviet Union) RVSN	
26 November; 02:30		RVSN	Sub-orbital	Test spacecraft	26 November 1991	Successful
26 November; 02:30	Apogee: 1,000 kilometres (620 mi)					
28 November; 07:10	(Soviet Union) R-36M2 Voevoda (SS-18 Mod 5)		(Soviet Union) Baikonur		(Soviet Union) RVSN	
28 November; 07:10		RVSN	Sub-orbital	Operational test flight	28 November 1991	Successful
28 November; 07:10	Apogee: 1,000 kilometres (620 mi)					
6 December; 00:54	(United States) Taurus-Nike-Tomahawk		(United States) Wallops Island		(United States) NASA	
6 December; 00:54	(United States) RED AIR 2	NASA	Sub-orbital	Plasma research	6 December 1991	Successful
6 December; 00:54	Apogee: 346 kilometres (215 mi)					
6 December; 01:19	(United States) Taurus-Nike-Tomahawk		(United States) NASA		(United States) Wallops Island	
6 December; 01:19	(United States) RED AIR 2	NASA	Sub-orbital	Plasma research	6 December 1991	Successful
6 December; 01:19	Apogee: 346 kilometres (215 mi)					
20 December; 21:31	(Soviet Union) Rokot		(Soviet Union) Baikonur		(Soviet Union) RVSN	
20 December; 21:31		RVSN	Sub-orbital	Test spacecraft	20 December 1991	Successful
20 December; 21:31	Apogee: 1,000 kilometres (620 mi)					
December	(Soviet Union) Volna		(Soviet Union) Submarine		(Soviet Union) VMF	
December		VMF	Sub-orbital	Operational test flight	Within an hour of launch	Successful
December	Apogee: 1,000 kilometres (620 mi)					
December	(Soviet Union) Zyb		(Soviet Union) Submarine		(Soviet Union) VMF	
December	(Soviet Union) Sprint	VMF	Sub-orbital	Technology demonstration	Within an hour of launch	Successful
December	Apogee: 500 kilometres (310 mi)					

- ← Jan
- Feb
- Mar
- Apr
- May
- Jun
- Jul
- Aug
- Sep
- Oct
- Nov
- Dec →
