= Cloud thickness =

Thickness of a cloud

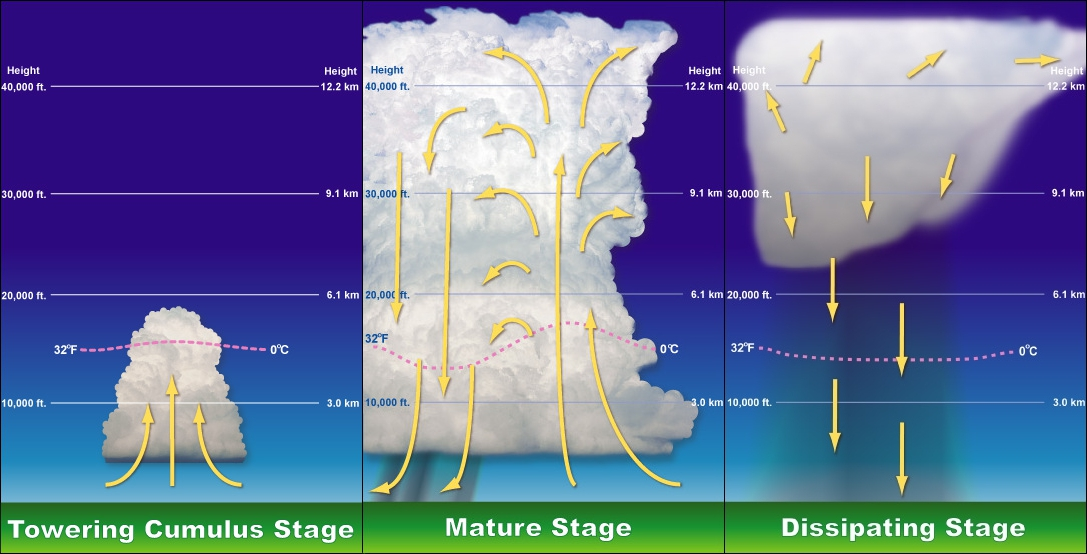
Convective cloud's thickness, between its base and top, shown on the background scale at different stages of its life

Cloud thickness, also known as cloud depth or occasionally cloud height, is the distance between the cloud base and the cloud top. It is traditionally expressed either in length or pressure difference.

== Measurement ==
The base of a cloud can be found using a ceilometer while the top of a cloud can be founding using lidar. Cloud thickness is the difference between those two values.

== Weather and climate relevance ==
Cloud thickness is often related to the intensity of precipitation generated by a cloud: deeper clouds tend to produce more intense rainfall. For instance, cumulonimbus clouds can develop vertically through a substantial part of the troposphere and often result in thunderstorms with lightning and heavy showers. By contrast, very thin clouds (such as cirrus clouds) do not generate any precipitation at the surface of the Earth.

== See also ==
- Cloud cover
