= Cloud base =

Height of the bottom of a cloud

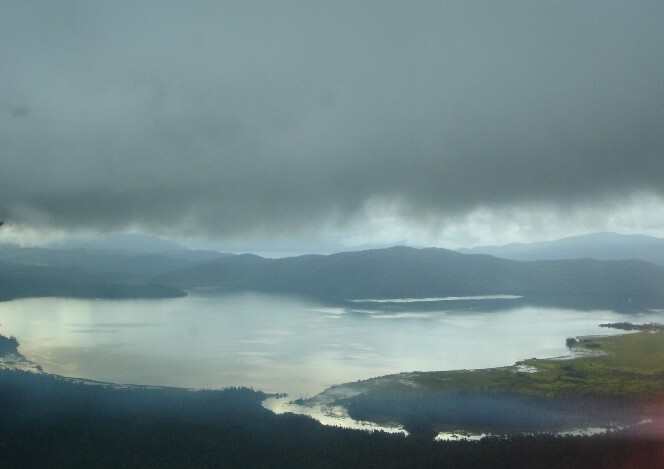
A cloud base over the island of Sulawesi, Indonesia

A cloud base (or the base of the cloud) is the lowest altitude of the visible portion of a cloud. It is traditionally expressed either in metres or feet above mean sea level or above a planetary surface, or as the pressure level corresponding to this altitude in hectopascals (hPa, equivalent to the millibar).

== Measurement ==
The height of the cloud base can be measured using a ceilometer. This device reflects a beam of light off the cloud base and then calculates its distance using either triangulation or travel time.

Alternatively, the cloud base can be estimated from surface measurements of air temperature and humidity by calculating the lifted condensation level. One method for doing this, used by the U.S. Federal Aviation Administration and often named after Tom Bradbury, is as follows:

1. Find the difference between the surface temperature and the dew point. This value is known as the "spread".
2. Divide the spread by 4.4 (if temperatures are in °F) or 2.5 (if temperatures are in °C), then multiply by 1000. This will give the altitude of the cloud base in feet above ground level. Put in a simpler way, 400 feet for every 1°C dew point spread. For metric divide the spread in °C by 8 and multiply by 1000 and get the cloud base in meters.
3. Add the results from step (2) to the field elevation to obtain the altitude of the cloud base above mean sea level.

== Weather and climate relevance ==
Rain clouds and snow clouds are clouds that have their bases below 2,000 meters above the ground.

In well-defined air masses, many (or even most) clouds may have a similar cloud base because this variable is largely controlled by the thermodynamic properties of that air mass, which are relatively homogeneous on a large spatial scale. This is not the case for the cloud tops, which can vary widely from cloud to cloud, as the depth of the cloud is determined by the strength of local convection.

Clouds greatly affect the transfer of radiation in the atmosphere. In the thermal spectral domain, water is a strong absorber (and thus emitter, according to Kirchhoff's law of thermal radiation); hence clouds exchange thermal radiation between their bases and the underlying planetary surface (land or ocean) by absorbing and re-emitting this infrared radiation at the prevailing temperature – the lower the cloud base, the warmer the cloud particles and the higher the rate of emission.

Cloud base is an important meteorological variable for aviation safety, as it determines whether pilots may use visual flight rules (VFR) or instrument flight rules for take-off and landing.

== See also ==
- Ceiling (cloud)
- Cloud cover
- Cloud thickness
