= Envisat =

ESA Earth observation satellite (2002–2012)

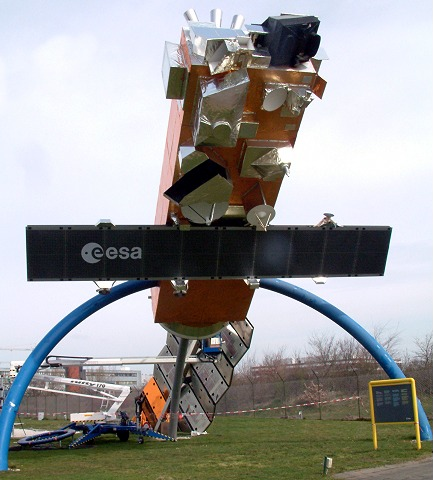
- Model of Envisat
- Mission type: Earth observation
- Operator: ESA
- COSPAR ID: 2002-009A
- SATCAT no.: 27386
- Website: envisat.esa.int
- Mission duration: Planned: 5 years Final: 10 years, 1 month, 6 days

Spacecraft properties
- Manufacturer: Astrium
- Launch mass: 8,211 kg (18,102 lb)
- Dimensions: 26 × 10 × 5 m (85 × 33 × 16 ft)
- Power: 6,500 watts

Start of mission
- Launch date: 1 March 2002, 01:07:59 UTC
- Rocket: Ariane 5G V-145
- Launch site: Kourou ELA-3
- Contractor: Arianespace

End of mission
- Disposal: None
- Declared: 9 May 2012
- Last contact: 8 April 2012 (spacecraft failure)
- Decay date: ~150 years

Orbital parameters
- Reference system: Geocentric
- Regime: Polar low Earth
- Semi-major axis: 7,144.9 km (4,439.6 mi)
- Eccentricity: 0.00042
- Perigee altitude: 772 km (480 mi)
- Apogee altitude: 774 km (481 mi)
- Inclination: 98.40 degrees
- Period: 100.16 minutes
- Repeat interval: 35 days
- Epoch: 15 December 2013, 03:07:00 UTC

Instruments
- ASAR; RA-2; MWR; MIPAS; MERIS; AATSR; DORIS; GOMOS; SCIAMACHY

Envisat ("Environmental Satellite") is a large Earth-observing satellite which has been inactive since 2012. It was launched on 1 March 2002 aboard an Ariane 5 from the Guyana Space Centre in Kourou, French Guiana, into a Sun synchronous polar orbit at an altitude of 790 ± 10 km.

Operated by the European Space Agency (ESA), it was the world's largest civilian Earth observation satellite. Its objective was to support the continuity of European Remote-Sensing Satellite missions, providing additional observations to improve environmental studies. To accomplish the global and regional objectives of the mission, numerous scientific disciplines used the data acquired from the sensors on the satellite to study atmospheric chemistry, ozone depletion, biological oceanography, ocean temperature and colour, wind waves, hydrology (humidity, floods), agriculture and arboriculture, natural hazards, digital elevation modelling (using interferometry), monitoring of maritime traffic, atmospheric dispersion modelling (pollution), cartography and snow and ice.

Envisat malfunctioned before it could be deorbited, and after losing contact with the satellite on 8 April 2012, ESA formally announced the end of Envisat's mission on 9 May 2012. The defunct satellite is considered space debris and orbits the Earth in about 101 minutes, with a repeat cycle of 35 days. An analysis that determined the 50 "statistically most concerning" debris objects in low Earth orbit ranked Envisat in 21st place.

Envisat was able to operate five years beyond its planned mission lifetime, delivering over a petabyte of data. At the time of its failure, Envisat had cost a total of 2.5 billion euro to develop, launch, and operate. The mission has been replaced by the Sentinel series of satellites. The first of these, Sentinel 1, has taken over the radar duties of Envisat since its launch in 2014.

== Mission ==
Envisat was launched as an Earth observation satellite. Its objective was to support the continuity of European Remote-Sensing Satellite missions, providing additional observations to improve environmental studies.

To accomplish the global and regional objectives of the mission, numerous scientific disciplines used the data acquired from the sensors on the satellite to study atmospheric chemistry, ozone depletion, biological oceanography, ocean temperature and colour, wind waves, hydrology (humidity, floods), agriculture and arboriculture, natural hazards, digital elevation modelling (using interferometry), monitoring of maritime traffic, atmospheric dispersion modelling (pollution), cartography and snow and ice.

== Specifications ==
Dimensions

26 m (85 ft) × 10 m (33 ft) × 5 m (16 ft) in orbit with the solar array deployed.

Mass

8,211 kg (18,102 lb), including 319 kg (703 lb) of fuel and a 2,118 kg (4,669 lb) instrument payload.

Power

Solar array with a total load of 3560 W.

== Instruments ==
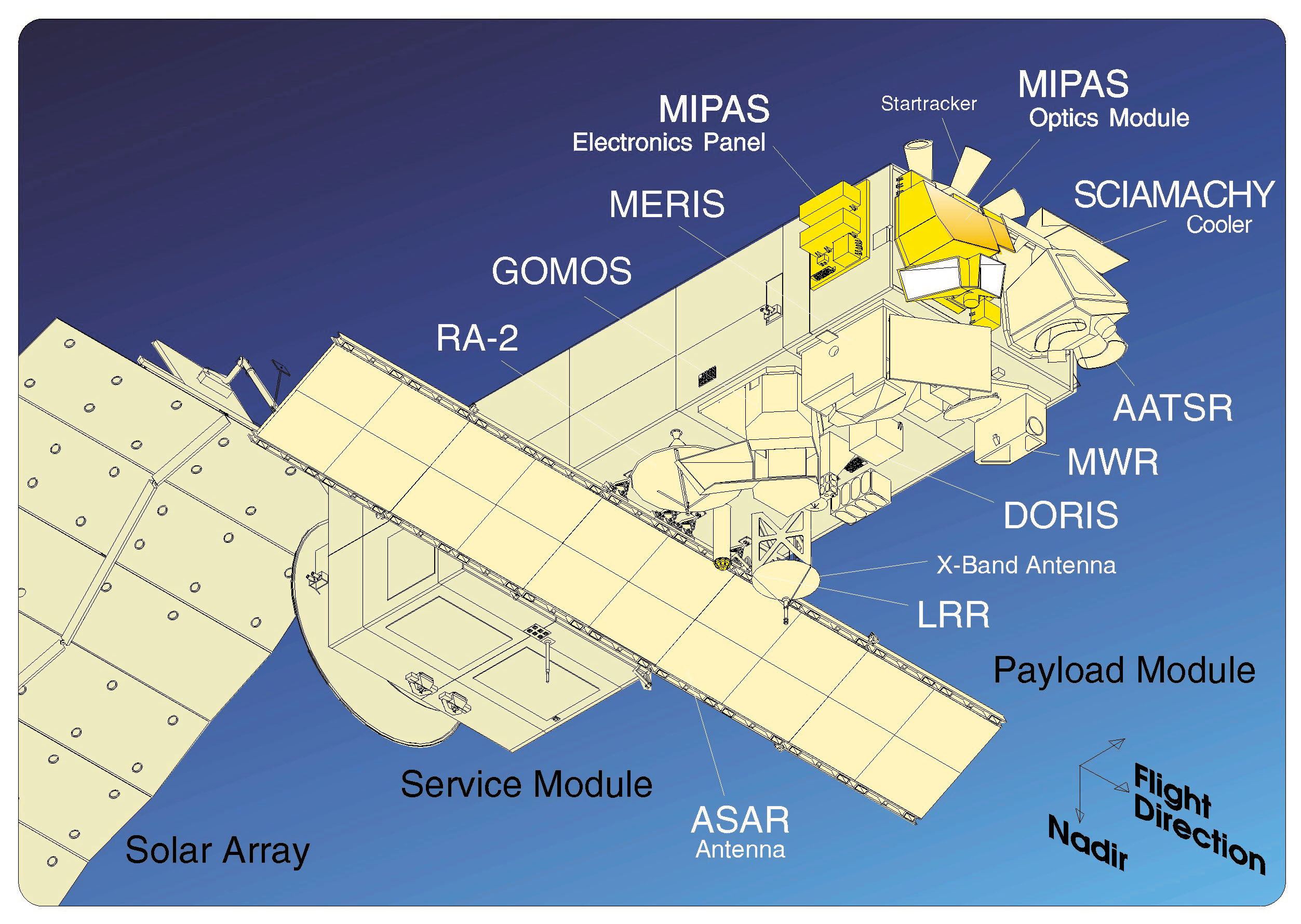
Instruments carried by Envisat.

Envisat carries an array of nine Earth-observation instruments that gathered information about the Earth (land, water, ice, and atmosphere) using a variety of measurement principles. A tenth instrument, DORIS, provided guidance and control. Several of the instruments were advanced versions of instruments that were flown on the earlier ERS-1 and ERS 2 missions and other satellites.

=== MWR ===
MWR (Microwave Radiometer) was designed for measuring water vapour in the atmosphere.

=== AATSR ===
AATSR (Advanced Along Track Scanning Radiometer) can measure the sea surface temperature in the visible and infrared spectra. It is the successor of ATSR1 and ATSR2, payloads of ERS 1 and ERS 2. AATSR can measure Earth's surface temperature to a precision of 0.3 K (0.54 °F), for climate research. Among the secondary objectives of AATSR is the observation of environmental parameters such as water content, biomass, and vegetal health and growth.

=== MIPAS ===
MIPAS (Michelson Interferometer for Passive Atmospheric Sounding) is a Fourier transforming infrared spectrometer which provides pressure and temperature profiles, and profiles of trace gases nitrogen dioxide (NO_{2}), nitrous oxide (N_{2}O), methane (CH_{4}), nitric acid (HNO_{3}), ozone (O_{3}), and water (H_{2}O) in the stratosphere. The instrument functions with high spectral resolution in an extended spectral band, which allows coverage across the Earth in all seasons and at equal quality night and day. MIPAS has a vertical resolution of 3 to 5 km (2 to 3 mi) depending on altitude (the larger at the level of the upper stratosphere).

=== MERIS ===
MERIS (MEdium Resolution Imaging Spectrometer) measures the reflectance of the Earth (surface and atmosphere) in the solar spectral range (390 to 1040 nm) and transmits 15 spectral bands back to the ground segment. MERIS was built at the Cannes Mandelieu Space Center.

=== SCIAMACHY ===
SCIAMACHY (SCanning Imaging Absorption spectroMeter for Atmospheric CHartographY) compares light coming from the sun to light reflected by the Earth, which provides information on the atmosphere through which the Earth-reflected light has passed.

SCIAMACHY is an image spectrometer with the principal objective of mapping the concentration of trace gases and aerosols in the troposphere and stratosphere. Rays of sunlight that are reflected transmitted, backscattered and reflected by the atmosphere are captured at a high spectral resolution (0.2 to 0.5 nm) for wavelengths between 240 and 1700 nm, and in certain spectra between 2,000 and 2,400 nm. Its high spectral resolution over a wide range of wavelengths can detect many trace gases even in tiny concentrations. The wavelengths captured also allow effective detection of aerosols and clouds. SCIAMACHY uses 3 different targeting modes: to the nadir (against the sun), to the limbus (through the atmospheric corona), and during solar or lunar eclipses. SCIAMACHY was built by Netherlands and Germany at TNO/TPD, SRON and Airbus Defence and Space Netherlands.

=== RA-2 ===
RA-2 (Radar Altimeter 2) is a dual-frequency Nadir pointing Radar operating in the K_{u} band and S bands, it is used to define ocean topography, map/monitor sea ice and measure land heights.

Mean sea level measurements from Envisat are continuously graphed at the Centre National d'Etudes Spatiales web site, on the Aviso page.

=== ASAR ===
ASAR (Advanced Synthetic Aperture Radar) operates in the C band in a wide variety of modes. It can detect changes in surface heights with sub-millimeter precision. It served as a data link for ERS 1 and ERS 2, providing numerous functions such as observations of different polarities of light or combining different polarities, angles of incidence and spatial resolutions.

| Mode | Id | Polarisation | Incidence | Resolution | Swath |
|---|---|---|---|---|---|
| Alternating polarisation | AP | HH/VV, HH/HV, VV/VH | 15–45° | 30–150 m | 58–110 km |
| Image | IM | HH, VV | 15–45° | 30–150 m | 58–110 km |
| Wave | WV | HH, VV | | 400 m | 5 km × 5 km |
| Suivi global (ScanSAR) | GM | HH, VV | | 1000 m | 405 km |
| Wide Swath (ScanSAR) | WS | HH, VV | | 150 m | 405 km |

These different types of raw data can be given several levels of treatment (suffixed to the ID of the acquisition mode: IMP, APS, and so on):

- RAW (raw data, or "Level 0"), which contains all the information necessary to create images.
- S (complex data, "Single Look Complex"), images in complex numeric form, the real and imaginary parts of the output of the compression algorithm
- P (precision image), amplified image with constant pixel width (12.5 m for IMP)
- M (medium precision image), amplified radiometry image with a resolution greater than P
- G (geocoded image), amplified image to which simple geographical transforms have been applied to show relief.

Data capture in WV mode is unusual in that they constitute a series of 5 km × 5 km spaced at 100 km.

=== DORIS ===
DORIS (Doppler Orbitography and Radiopositioning Integrated by Satellite) determines the satellite's orbit to within 10 cm (4 in).

=== GOMOS ===
GOMOS (Global Ozone Monitoring by Occultation of Stars) looks at stars as they descend through the Earth's atmosphere and change colour, allowing measurement of gases such as ozone (O_{3}), including their vertical distribution.

GOMOS uses the principle of occultation. Its sensors detect light from a star traversing the Earth's atmosphere and measures the depletion of that light by trace gases nitrogen dioxide (NO_{2}), nitrogen trioxide, (NO_{3}), OClO), ozone (O_{3}) and aerosols present between about 20 to 80 km (12 to 50 mi) altitude. It has a resolution of 3 km (1.9 mi).

== End of mission ==
=== Loss of contact ===
ESA announced on 12 April 2012 that they lost contact with Envisat on Sunday, 8 April 2012, after 10 years of service, exceeding the initially planned life span by 5 years. The spacecraft was still in a stable orbit, but attempts to contact it were unsuccessful. Ground-based radar and the French Pleiades Earth probe were used to image the silent Envisat and look for damage. ESA formally announced the end of Envisat's mission on 9 May 2012.

Envisat was launched in 2002 and it operated five years beyond its planned mission lifetime, delivering over a petabyte of data. ESA was planning to operate the spacecraft until 2014.

=== Space safety ===
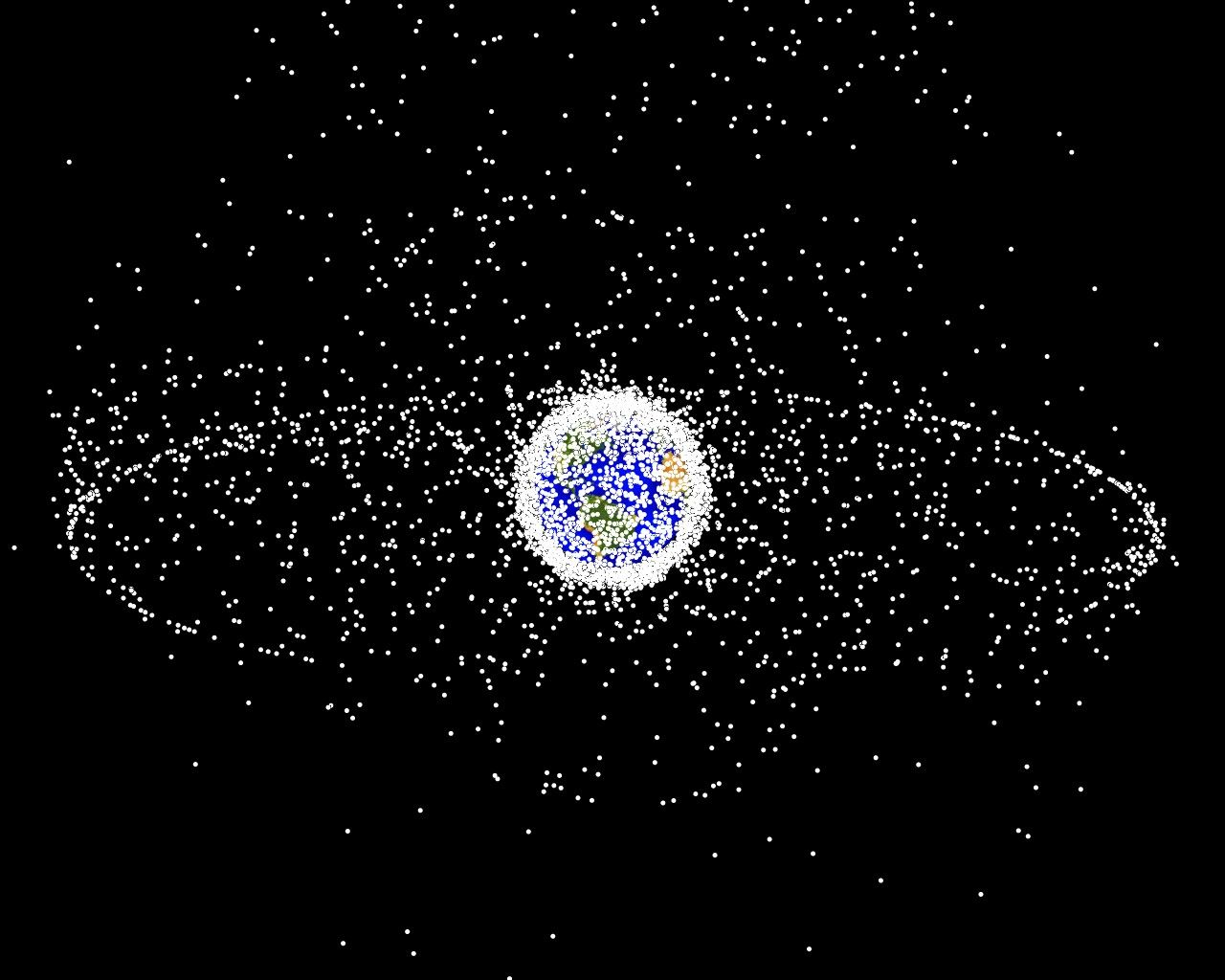
Space debris populations seen from outside geosynchronous orbit (GEO). Note the two primary debris fields, the ring of objects in GEO, and the cloud of objects in low Earth orbit (LEO).

The defunct Envisat satellite is considered space debris and orbits the Earth in about 101 minutes, with a repeat cycle of 35 days. It poses a hazard because of the risk of collisions. Given its orbit and its area-to-mass ratio, it will take about 150 years for the satellite to be gradually pulled into the Earth's atmosphere. Envisat is currently orbiting in an environment where two catalogued space debris objects can be expected to pass within about 200 m (660 ft) of it every year, which would likely trigger the need for a manoeuvre to avoid a possible collision. A collision between a satellite the size of Envisat and an object as small as 10 kg could produce a very large cloud of debris, initiating a self-sustaining chain-reaction of collisions and fragmentation with production of new debris, a phenomenon known as the Kessler Syndrome. An analysis that determined the 50 "statistically most concerning" debris objects in low Earth orbit ranked Envisat in 21st place.

Envisat was a candidate for a mission to remove it from orbit, called e.Deorbit. The spacecraft sent to bring down Envisat would itself need to have a mass of approximately 1.6 tonnes.

== See also ==
- List of European Space Agency programmes and missions
- List of heaviest spacecraft
- List of large reentering space debris
