= AATSR =

Instrument on the European Space Agency's Envisat satellite

The Advanced Along Track Scanning Radiometer (AATSR) is one of the Announcement of Opportunity (AO) instruments on board the European Space Agency (ESA)'s Envisat satellite.

This instrument is a multi-channel imaging radiometer with the principal objective of providing data concerning global Sea Surface Temperature (SST) to the high levels of accuracy and stability required for monitoring and carrying out research into the behaviour of the Earth's climate.

AATSR can measure Earth's surface temperature to a precision of 0.3 K (0.5 °F), for climate research. Among the secondary objectives of AATSR is the observation of environmental parameters such as aerosols, clouds, fires, gas flares, water content, biomass, and vegetal health and growth. AATSR is the successor of ATSR-1 and ATSR-2, payloads of ERS-1 and ERS-2.

== Details ==
=== Accuracy ===
The required accuracies are better than 0.3 °C with a stability approaching 0.1 °C /decade. Because of its wide angle lens it is possible to make very precise measurements of atmospheric effects on how emissions from the Earth's surface propagate.

In order to achieve this accuracy while viewing the Earth's surface through the atmosphere, AATSR views the surface at two angles, one close to the nadir (immediately below the satellite) and the other along the satellite track at close to 55° from the nadir, thereby providing two views of each point on the Earth's surface, each with a different effective atmospheric thickness. This dual-view system enables a particularly accurate estimate to be made of the signal degradation due to atmospheric absorption and scattering.

=== Calibration ===
AATSR also embodies an exceptionally precise and stable on-board calibration system, comprising two reference targets specially designed for high uniformity and stability. These two targets, known as 'black bodies' are maintained at temperatures near to the extremes of the Earth temperatures as measured by AATSR and they are both viewed during each scan cycle of the instrument. This calibration system ensures that measurements of thermal radiation from the Earth’s surface are properly calibrated and do not rely on ground-based measurements, although such measurements are continually used to evaluate AATSR’s performance.

=== Channels ===
AATSR has three channels at thermal infrared wavelengths, from which surface temperatures are derived over both sea and land surfaces. In addition, AATSR has four visible and near-infrared wavelength channels which are used to identify cloudy areas and to measure solar radiation that is scattered and reflected from the Earth’s surface and atmosphere. These channels provide measurements from which land-cover properties, for example, NDVI, as well as clouds and atmospheric particulate matter (or aerosols) can be studied.

The dual-view measurements provided by the along-track scanning technique is also a key feature of AATSR when used for atmospheric or vegetation measurements. As with the SST measurements, the two measurements of each point on the surface through different atmospheric path lengths greatly simplifies the task of separating the surface and atmospheric contributions to the measured signal. Thus the effects of atmospheric aerosols can be removed from surface products (such as surface reflectance or NDVI). Conversely, a similar approach can be used to account for the surface reflectance in determining aerosol or cloud properties. Additionally, the parallax between the two views can be used to determine cloud top and aerosol plume heights using geometric means.

=== Importance ===
One of the most important aspects of the ATSR series of space instruments is that it has, over a period of just over 15 years, undergone the transition from experimental sensor on the ERS satellites, developing the technique and demonstrating the accuracy that can be achieved with along-track scanning, to that of an operational system, within Europe’s Envisat and future GMES Programmes.

== Funding and Origin ==
The AATSR is a nationally provided instrument, funded by the UK’s Department for Environment, Food and Rural Affairs (Defra) in order to support their programme of climate prediction and research. It was developed and is operated in collaboration with ESA. There is also a significant Australian contribution to the AATSR programme, now managed by the Commonwealth Scientific and Industrial Research Organisation. The predecessor instruments, ATSR-1 and ATSR-2, were funded by the UK's Science and Engineering Research Council. This funding responsibility was transferred to the UK's Natural Environment Research Council in 1993.

== Predecessors ==
AATSR is the third in a series of instruments started by ATSR-1, which was launched in 1991 on the European Remote-Sensing Satellite, ERS-1. This was followed by ATSR-2 on ERS-2 in 1995 and by AATSR on the Envisat satellite in 2002. The original ATSR-1 instrument lacked the three shortest wavelength channels provided by AATSR, whereas ATSR-2 was functionally identical. This has led to a near-continuous SST dataset extending from 1991 to the present day. Looking to the future, a successor instrument is being developed to fly on ESA’s Sentinel 3 satellite, which is part of the space segment of the European Global Monitoring for Environment and Security (GMES) programme. This will ensure the continuity of AATSR-standard SST data into the foreseeable future.

== Successor ==
The Sentinel 3 Earth observational satellite will house many earth observational instruments including SLSTR (Sea and Land Surface Temperature Radiometer) which is the successor to AATSR.
