= European Remote-Sensing Satellite =

European Space Agency Earth-observing satellite program

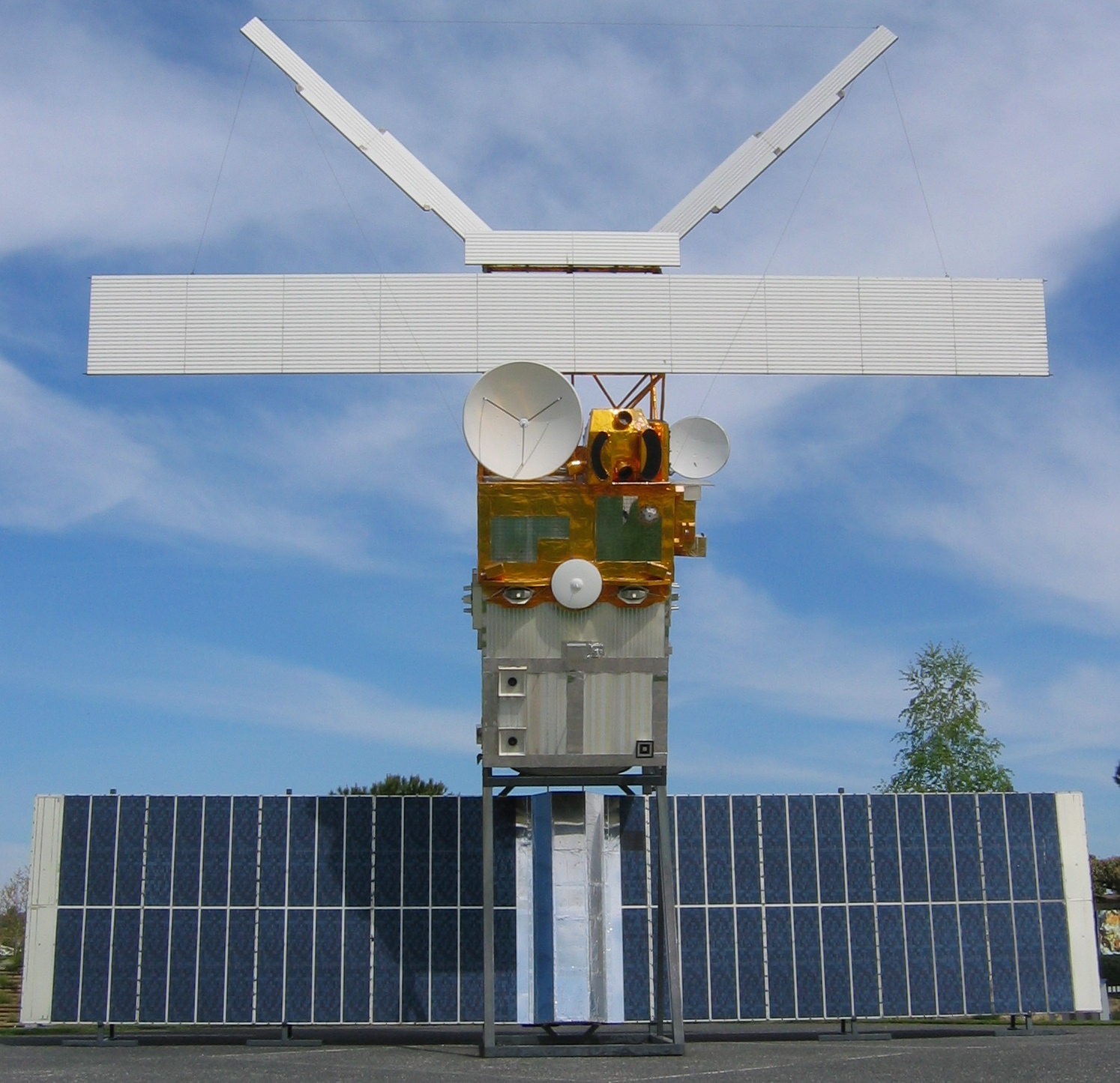
A full-size model of ERS-2.

European Remote Sensing satellite (ERS) was the European Space Agency's first Earth-observing satellite programme using a polar orbit. It consisted of two satellites, ERS-1 and ERS-2, with ERS-1 being launched in 1991.

== ERS-1 ==
ERS-1
- Mission type: Earth observation
- COSPAR ID: 1991-050A

End of mission
- Declared: 10 March 2000

ERS-1 launched 17 July 1991 from Guiana Space Centre aboard an Ariane 4 rocket. The satellite was put into a Sun-synchronous polar orbit at an altitude of 782–785 km. ERS-1 failed on 10 March 2000 after nine years in orbit.

=== Instruments ===
ERS-1 carried an array of Earth-observation instruments that gathered information about the Earth (land, water, ice, and atmosphere) using a variety of measurement principles. These included:

- RA (Radar Altimeter) is a single frequency nadir-pointing radar altimeter operating in the K_{u} band.
- ATSR-1 (Along-Track Scanning Radiometer) is a 4 channel infrared radiometer and microwave sounder for measuring temperatures at the sea-surface and the top of clouds.
- SAR (synthetic-aperture radar) operating in C band can detect changes in surface heights with sub-millimeter precision.
- Wind Scatterometer used to calculate information on wind speed and direction.
- MWR is a Microwave Radiometer used in measuring atmospheric water, as well as providing a correction for the atmospheric water for the altimeter.

To accurately determine its orbit, the satellite included the PRARE (Precision Range and Range-Rate Equipment) and a laser retroreflector. The PRARE became non-operational shortly after launch; later analysis concluded that the failure was due to a memory latchup caused by radiation. The retroreflector was used for calibrating the radar altimeter to within 10 cm.

=== Mission ===
ERS-1 had various mission phases using 3-day and 35-day repeat cycles. During the geodetic mission, ERS-1 was put in two long repeat cycles of 168 days, which is equivalent to a single 336-day cycle. The geodetic mission allowed for accurate mapping of the Earth's bathymetry and geoid over the seas using the Radar Altimeter.

On 10 March 2000, ERS-1's attitude control system failed due to a gyroscope malfunction and its mission was officially declared finished.

== ERS-2 ==
ERS-2
- Mission type: Earth observation
- COSPAR ID: 1995-021A

End of mission
- Deactivated: 5 September 2011
- Decay date: 21 February 2024

Orbital parameters
- Altitude: 780 km (480 mi)
- Inclination: 98.5°

Its successor, ERS-2, was launched on 21 April 1995, on an Ariane 4, from ESA's Guiana Space Centre near Kourou, French Guiana. Largely identical to ERS-1, it added additional instruments and improved existing instruments including:

- GOME (Global Ozone Monitoring Experiment) is a nadir scanning ultraviolet and visible spectrometer.
- ATSR-2 included 3 visible spectrum bands specialized for chlorophyll and vegetation

When ERS-2 was launched, ERS-1 shared the same orbital plane. This allowed a tandem mission, with ERS-2 passing the same point on the ground 1 day later than ERS-1. ERS-2 has a repeat cycle of 35 days.

ERS-2 operated without gyroscopes from February 2001, resulting in some degradation of the data provided by the instruments. The tape drive aboard failed on 22 June 2003, leaving the instruments operating only within visibility of a ground station. After the tape drive failure additional ground stations were brought online to increase the data gathering abilities of the satellite. The Wind Scatterometer and GOME were the only instruments of their kind until the launches of MetOp-A and Envisat, respectively.

The successor to ERS-2 was the Envisat satellite, launched 1 March 2002. Envisat contained improved versions of many of the instruments onboard ERS-2. However, even after the launch of its successor, the operational life of ERS-2 was extended until 2011, when the decision was made to end the mission. Over a series of burns in July, August and September, ERS-2 was finally depleted of all fuel on 5 September 2011. At 13:16:38 the batteries were switched off and the satellite decommissioned. The spacecraft was left in an orbit where it will reenter the Earth's atmosphere and safely disintegrate within 25 years, in accordance with international standards.

In the final stages of emptying the fuel tanks, it was estimated that they would be empty after a 40-minute burn on 2 September 2011. However, the spacecraft survived both this manoeuvre and a second 40-minute burn on 3 September. On 5 September a third burn was initiated. The fuel tanks were finally drained, and the spacecraft orbit was lowered from 785 to 573 km above Earth.

In February 2024, ESA reported that ERS-2 was expected to reenter in an uncontrolled fashion, some time between 16 February and 22 February 2024.

The satellite reentered at 1717 UTC on 21 February, in the Pacific Ocean between Alaska and Hawaii.

== See also ==
- 1991 in spaceflight
- 1995 in spaceflight

== Notes ==
- Zhao, D.; Kuenzer, C.; Fu, C.; Wagner, W. (2008). "Evaluation of the ERS Scatterometer derived Soil Water Index to monitor water availability and precipitation distribution at three different scales in China". Journal of Hydrometeorology. 9 (3). AMS: 549–562. Bibcode:2008JHyMe...9..549Z. doi:10.1175/2007JHM965.1.
