= MR-20 =

Russian meteorological rocket

- Country of origin: Soviet Union, Russia
- Successor: MR-30

meteorological rocket

MR-20 is a Russian (former Soviet Union) sounding rocket, and is a type of meteorological rocket. It was followed by the MR-30.

== Launching experiments ==
In 1985, an MR-20 meteorological rocket was used from the North Atlantic in a Soviet-Polish experiment adapting an ion gun to inject lithium ions into the ionosphere.

In September 1988, 3 MR-20 rocket experiments with artificial "electron hole" formations took place in the Northern Auroral Zone on the research vessel named "Professor Vize". The launching of MR-20 rockets were to examine the upper atmospheric and ionospheric characteristics in the Auroral.
