= Cloud top =

Highest altitude of the visible portion of a cloud

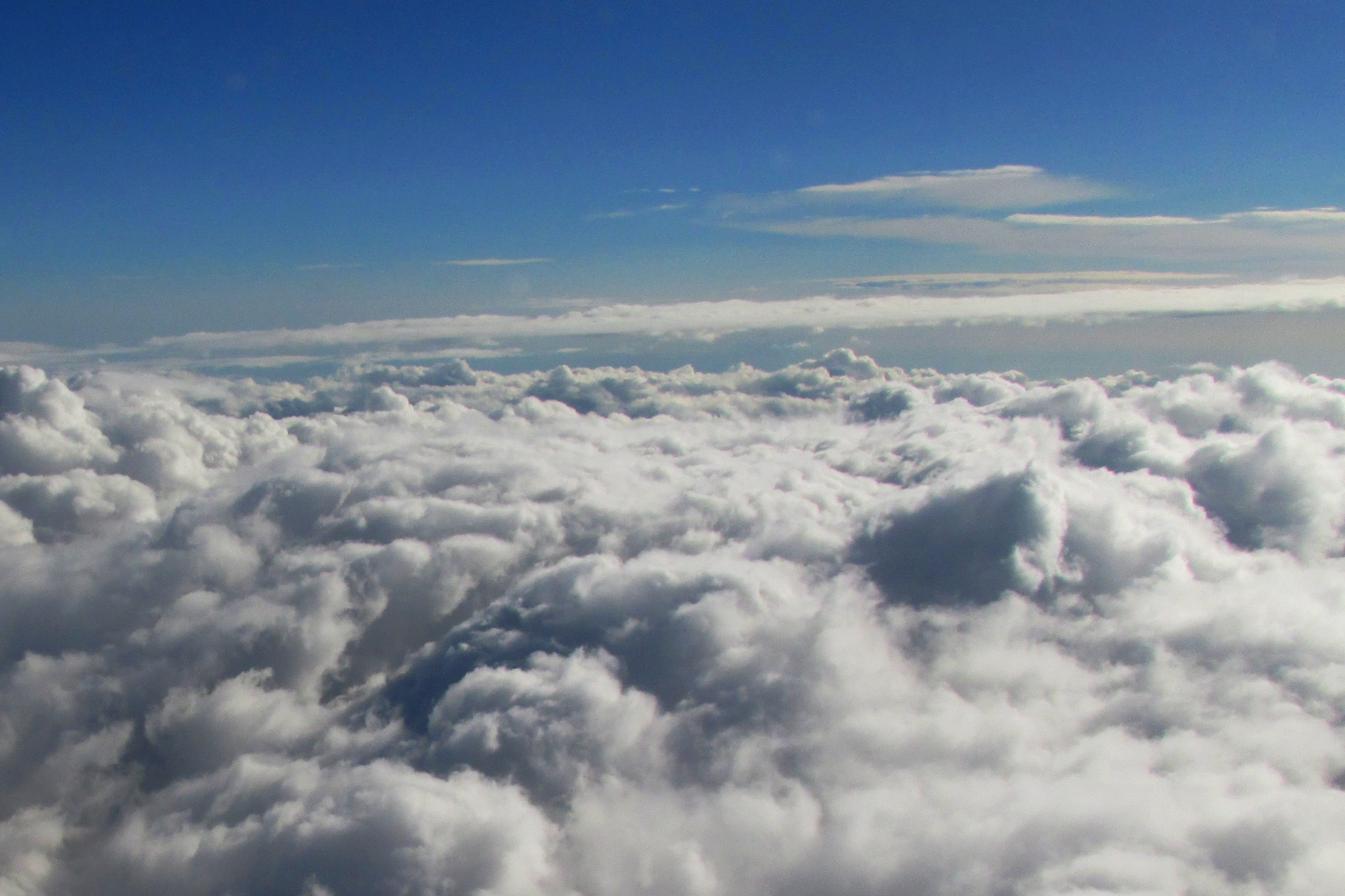
View of clouds from above

The cloud top (or the top of the cloud) is the highest altitude of the visible portion of a cloud. It is traditionally expressed either in metres above the Earth (or planetary) surface, or as the corresponding pressure level in hectopascal (hPa, equivalent to the traditional but now obsolete millibar).

== Measurement ==
The cloud top is where the snow, rain and sleet come from. Cloud top height can be estimated from the ground by triangulation. However, this is often inconvenient as this is practically feasible only for isolated clouds in full view of (and some horizontal distance away from) the observers. Ground-based radars can be used to derive this cloud property.

An alternative (but also more expensive) approach is to acquire airborne observations either visually or using specific instruments such as a lidar. This technique is very appropriate to characterize individual clouds (and specifically to control or evaluate the accuracy of other methods) but becomes unmanageable to repetitively monitor clouds over large areas.

Cloud top height may be derived from satellite measurements, either through stereophotogrammetry (using pairs of images acquired at different observation angles) or by converting temperature measurements into estimations of height. An example of the stereo technique using the Multi-angle Imaging SpectroRadiometer (MISR) instrument and using the Along Track Scanning Radiometer instruments (ATSR-1, ATSR-2 and AATSR).

Cloud top pressure can also be used as an indicator of cloud top height. The Cooperative Institute for Meteorological Satellite Studies (CIMSS) provides real-time cloud top pressure maps of the conterminous United States derived from data obtained from the GOES 11 and GOES 12 satellites.

== Weather and climate relevance ==
In convective clouds, the cloud top is largely influenced by the strength of the convection activity, which itself may depend on surface properties, in particular the supply of heat and water vapor below the cloud. Cloud top height is often much more variable than cloud base elevation.

Clouds greatly affect the transfer of radiation in the atmosphere. In the solar spectral domain, cloud albedo is directly related to the nature, size and shape of cloud particles, which themselves are affected by the height of the cloud top. In the thermal domain, water is a strong absorber (and thus emitter, according to Kirchhoff's law of thermal radiation). Hence clouds cool down from the top through infrared radiation at the prevailing temperature: the higher the cloud top, the cooler the particles and the lower the rate of emission.

== See also ==
- Cloud height
- Cloud cover
