= Kosmos 2126 =

Russian communications satellite

Strela
- Manufacturer: NPO PM
- Country of origin: Soviet Union; Russia
- Operator: VKS / GRU; VKO
- Applications: Military communications

Specifications
- Power: 40 watts from solar panels
- Batteries: Nickel hydrogen
- Equipment: UHF transponders (NATO B / D band); Data rate of up to 64 kbit/s)
- Regime: Low Earth
- Design life: 5 years

Production
- Status: Operational
- Retired: Yes

Related spacecraft
- Derivatives: Gonets (civil satellites)

Kosmos 2126, also known as Cosmos 2126, was a Russian satellite that was part of the Strela-1M generation of communications satellites that operated in low Earth orbit to collect (store) information then forward (dump) it to a ground station when overhead of its ground station. Kosmos-2126 was launched in 1991 from the Plesetsk Cosmodrome.

== Mission ==
Kosmos 2126 was launched in 1991 from the Plesetsk Cosmodrome in eastern Russia on a Kosmos-3M launch vehicle. Part of the Strela (Russian: Стрела, for Arrow) 1M satellite network, the satellite was used for communication using relay satellites for military and government purposes. The last mission in this network of satellites was in June 1992.

The Strela-1M satellites were orbited in octuplets (Kosmos 2125 to Kosmos 2132 on the launch that delivered Kosmos 2126 to orbit) and were allowed to drift in their 1500 km orbits to allow a more or less even distribution. Due to the short lifetime of the satellites, the constellation was replenished once or twice per year. The network has now been superseded by the more modern and capable Strela 3 system, however it is still in orbit with active transmissions on two frequencies, and has not decayed like its sister satellite Kosmos 2124.
