= 1991 in spaceflight =

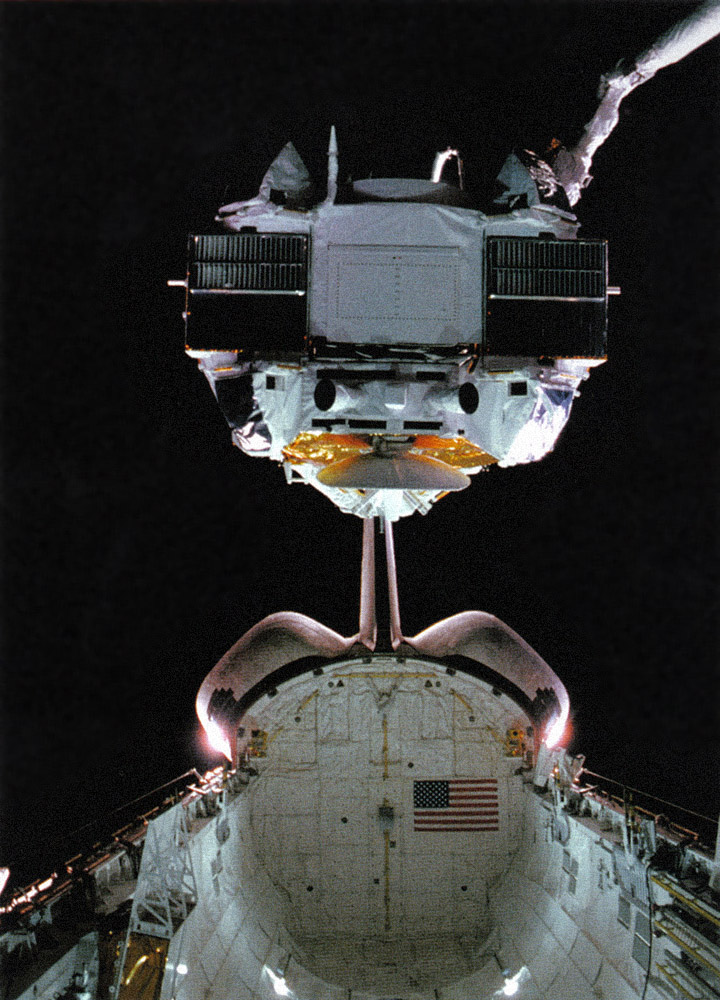
- The crew of STS-37 deploys the Compton Gamma Ray Observatory.

Orbital launches
- First: 8 January
- Last: 28 December
- Total: 91
- Successes: 86
- Failures: 3
- Partial failures: 2

National firsts
- Space traveller: Austria; United Kingdom

Rockets
- Maiden flights: Ariane 4 44P; Atlas II
- Retirements: Vostok-2M

Crewed flights
- Orbital: 8
- Total travellers: 36

This was the final year of the Soviet Union, and thus the end of the Cold War competition between the two space superpowers. The number of launches subsequently declined in the 1990s, and 2018 was the first year since 1990 to have more than 100 orbital launches.

1991 in spaceflight

- ← Jan
- Feb
- Mar
- Apr
- May
- Jun
- Jul
- Aug
- Sep
- Oct
- Nov
- Dec →

== Deep Space Rendezvous in 1991 ==
| Date (GMT) | Spacecraft | Event | Remarks |
|---|---|---|---|
| 29 October | Galileo | First flyby of asteroid - 951 Gaspra | Closest approach: 1,600 kilometres (990 mi) |

== EVAs ==
| Start date/time | Duration | End time | Spacecraft | Crew | Remarks |
|---|---|---|---|---|---|
| 7 January; 17:03 | 5 hours 18 minutes | 22:21 | Mir EO-8 | (Soviet Union) Viktor Afanasyev (Soviet Union) Musa Manarov | Successfully repaired the damaged hatch on the Kvant-2 airlock and also positioned equipment for installation in a later EVA. |
| 23 January; 10:59 | 5 hours 33 minutes | 16:32 | Mir EO-8; Kvant-2 | (Soviet Union) Viktor Afanasyev (Soviet Union) Musa Manarov | Installed the new Stela boom on the base block. |
| 26 January; 09:00 | 6 hours 20 minutes | 15:20 | Mir EO-8; Kvant-2 | (Soviet Union) Viktor Afanasyev (Soviet Union) Musa Manarov | Installed supports on Kvant-1 to hold the solar arrays installed on Kristall. |
| 7 April | 4 hours 26 minutes | | STS-37; Atlantis | (United States) Jerry L. Ross (United States) Jerome Apt | When the boom antenna on the GRO satellite would not extend, Ross and Apt exited the shuttle on an unplanned EVA to extend the boom to prepare for final release into orbit. |
| 8 April | 5 hours 47 minutes | | STS-37; Atlantis | (United States) Jerry L. Ross (United States) Jerome Apt | Installed and tested several monorail-type mobility tools for future space station construction. |
| 25 April; 20:29 | 3 hours 34 minutes | 26 April; 00:03 | Mir EO-8; Kvant-2 | (Soviet Union) Viktor Afanasyev (Soviet Union) Musa Manarov | Inspected and filmed the Kurs antenna on Kvant-1, finding that one of the antenna dishes was missing and then re-installed the camera on Kvant-2 that was removed and repaired. |
| 24 June; 21:11 | 4 hours 58 minutes | 25 June; 02:09 | Mir EO-9; Kvant-2 | (Soviet Union) Anatoly Artsebarsky (Soviet Union) Sergei Krikalyov | Replaced the damaged Kurs antenna on Kvant-1 and performed assembly tests on an experimental structural joint. |
| 28 June; 19:02 | 3 hours 24 minutes | 22:26 | Mir EO-9; Kvant-2 | (Soviet Union) Anatoly Artsebarsky (Soviet Union) Sergei Krikalyov | Attached TREK, a type of cosmic ray detector developed at the University of California, to the outside of Mir. |
| 15 July; 11:45 | 5 hours 56 minutes | 17:41 | Mir EO-9; Kvant-2 | (Soviet Union) Anatoly Artsebarsky (Soviet Union) Sergei Krikalyov | Moved ladders and the base platform parts for the Sofora girder using the Strela boom from the airlock at Kvant-2 and installed them on Kvant-1. |
| 19 July; 11:10 | 5 hours 28 minutes | 16:38 | Mir EO-9; Kvant-2 | (Soviet Union) Anatoly Artsebarsky (Soviet Union) Sergei Krikalyov | Started construction of the Sofora girder by installing three of 20 structural pieces. |
| 23 July; 09:15 | 5 hours 42 minutes | 14:57 | Mir EO-9; Kvant-2 | (Soviet Union) Anatoly Artsebarsky (Soviet Union) Sergei Krikalyov | Continued the construction of the Sofora girder by installing eleven more of the 20 girder pieces. |
| 27 July; 08:44 | 6 hours 49 minutes | 15:33 | Mir EO-9; Kvant-2 | (Soviet Union) Anatoly Artsebarsky (Soviet Union) Sergei Krikalyov | Completed assembly of the Sofora girder and mounted a small Russian flag on top of the structure. Artsebarsky had trouble with fogging on his visor, due to overexertion, but Krikalyov was able to lead him back to the airlock. |
