= Vandenberg Launch Facility 2 =

Launch Facility 02
- Location: 34.8448°N 120.5846°W
- Short name: LF-02
- Operator: United States Army
- Launch pad(s): 1
Launch history
- Status: Active
- Launches: 72
- Associated rockets: Minuteman, GBI

Vandenberg Space Force Base Launch Facility 02 (LF-02) is a former US Air Force Intercontinental ballistic missile launch facility on Vandenberg SFB, California, USA. It was a launch site for the land-based Minuteman and Peacekeeper missile series. In the 2000s the silo was remodeled into a launch site for an Interceptor for the Ground-Based Midcourse Defense System.

== Launches at LF-02 ==
| Date | Launch Facility# | System | Nickname |
|---|---|---|---|
| 16-Jan-64 | LF-02 | MINUTEMAN IB | DOUBLE BARREL |
| 24-Feb-64 | LF-02 | MINUTEMAN IB | SNAP ROLL |
| 23-Mar-64 | LF-02 | MINUTEMAN IB | BIG TREE |
| 7-May-64 | LF-02 | MINUTEMAN IB | BLACK WASP |
| 15-Jun-64 | LF-02 | MINUTEMAN IB | CRUSH PROOF |
| 7-Jul-64 | LF-02 | MINUTEMAN IB | FIVE POINTS |
| 10-Sep-64 | LF-02 | MINUTEMAN IB | HOT ROOF |
| 6-Nov-64 | LF-02 | MINUTEMAN IB | ORANGE CHUTE |
| 9-Dec-64 | LF-02 | MINUTEMAN IB | NICKED BLADE |
| 2-Feb-65 | LF-02 | MINUTEMAN IB | RED BRIDGE |
| 16-Mar-65 | LF-02 | MINUTEMAN IB | TAIL FIN |
| 13-Apr-65 | LF-02 | MINUTEMAN IB | SEA POINT |
| 10-Jun-65 | LF-02 | MINUTEMAN IB | SPEED KING |
| 8-Mar-66 | LF-02 | MINUTEMAN IB | BAIT CAN |
| 4-Apr-66 | LF-02 | MINUTEMAN IB | FLY BURNER |
| 2-May-66 | LF-02 | MINUTEMAN IB | LACE STRAP |
| 2-Jun-66 | LF-02 | MINUTEMAN IB | FOUR ACES |
| 13-Jul-66 | LF-02 | MINUTEMAN IB | YOUNG LION |
| 16-Aug-66 | LF-02 | MINUTEMAN IB | GIBSON GIRL |
| 28-Apr-67 | LF-02 | MINUTEMAN IB | BUSY MUMMY |
| 19-May-67 | LF-02 | MINUTEMAN IB | BUSY GIANT |
| 28-Jun-67 | LF-02 | MINUTEMAN IB |
| 15-Jul-67 | LF-02 | MINUTEMAN IB | GIN BABY I |
| 3-Nov-67 | LF-02 | MINUTEMAN IB | GIN BABY II |
| 8-Dec-67 | LF-02 | MINUTEMAN IB | GIN BABY IV |
| 29-Jan-69 | LF-02 | MINUTEMAN II | SPEC TEST 1 |
| 11-Apr-69 | LF-02 | MINUTEMAN III | -- |
| 29-May-69 | LF-02 | MINUTEMAN III | -- |
| 13-Sep-69 | LF-02 | MINUTEMAN III |
| 15-Oct-69 | LF-02 | MINUTEMAN III |
| 31-Oct-69 | LF-02 | MINUTEMAN III |
| 22-Apr-70 | LF-02 | MINUTEMAN III |
| 8-May-70 | LF-02 | MINUTEMAN III |
| 17-Jun-70 | LF-02 | MINUTEMAN III |
| 28-Jul-70 | LF-02 | MINUTEMAN III |
| 25-Sep-70 | LF-02 | MINUTEMAN III | Old Fox 02M |
| 16-Feb-71 | LF-02 | MINUTEMAN III | Old Fox 05M |
| 27-May-71 | LF-02 | MINUTEMAN III | GLORY TRIP 03GM |
| 8-Jul-71 | LF-02 | MINUTEMAN III | GLORY TRIP 04GM |
| 3-Sep-71 | LF-02 | MINUTEMAN III | GLORY TRIP 05GM |
| 15-Oct-71 | LF-02 | MINUTEMAN III | GLORY TRIP 06GM |
| 22-Nov-71 | LF-02 | MINUTEMAN III | GLORY TRIP 08GM |
| 26-Jan-72 | LF-02 | MINUTEMAN III | GLORY TRIP 11GM |
| 11-Jun-72 | LF-02 | MINUTEMAN III | GLORY TRIP 14GM |
| 20-Oct-72 | LF-02 | MINUTEMAN II | GLORY TRIP 110M |
| 4-Dec-72 | LF-02 | MINUTEMAN III | GLORY TRIP 41GM |
| 17-Apr-73 | LF-02 | MINUTEMAN II | GLORY TRIP 112M |
| 5-Sep-73 | LF-02 | MINUTEMAN III | GLORY TRIP 43GM |
| 2-Apr-74 | LF-02 | MINUTEMAN II | GLORY TRIP 119M |
| 2-May-74 | LF-02 | MINUTEMAN III | GLORY TRIP 44GM |
| 17-Aug-74 | LF-02 | MINUTEMAN III | GLORY TRIP 45GM |
| 7-Oct-74 | LF-02 | MINUTEMAN II | GLORY TRIP 118M |
| 16-May-75 | LF-02 | MINUTEMAN III | STM-9W |
| 26-Jul-75 | LF-02 | MINUTEMAN III | STM-10W |
| 23-Aug-86 | LF-02 | PEACEKEEPER | FTM-15 |
| 5-Dec-86 | LF-02 | PEACEKEEPER | FTM-14 |
| 14-Sep-89 | LF-02 | PEACEKEEPER | GLORY TRIP 01PA |
| 12-Mar-91 | LF-02 | PEACEKEEPER | GLORY TRIP 05PA |
| 17-Sep-91 | LF-02 | PEACEKEEPER | GLORY TRIP 07PA |
| 30-Jun-92 | LF-02 | PEACEKEEPER | GLORY TRIP 09PA |
| 4-Mar-93 | LF-02 | PEACEKEEPER | GLORY TRIP 11PA |
| 15-Sep-93 | LF-02 | PEACEKEEPER | GLORY TRIP 13PA |
| 17-May-94 | LF-02 | PEACEKEEPER | GLORY TRIP 15PA |
| 19-Jan-95 | LF-02 | PEACEKEEPER | GLORY TRIP 17PA |
| 30-Aug-95 | LF-02 | PEACEKEEPER | GLORY TRIP 19PA |
| 30-May-96 | LF-02 | PEACEKEEPER | GLORY TRIP 21PA |
| 6-Nov-96 | LF-02 | PEACEKEEPER | GLORY TRIP 23PA |
| 5-Nov-97 | LF-02 | PEACEKEEPER | GLORY TRIP 26PA |
| 10-Mar-99 | LF-02 | PEACEKEEPER | GLORY TRIP 28PA |
| 27-Jul-01 | LF-02 | PEACEKEEPER | GLORY TRIP 30PA |
| 3-Jun-02 | LF-02 | PEACEKEEPER | GLORY TRIP 31PA |
| 12-Mar-03 | LF-02 | PEACEKEEPER | GLORY TRIP 32PA |
