= List of online digital musical document libraries =

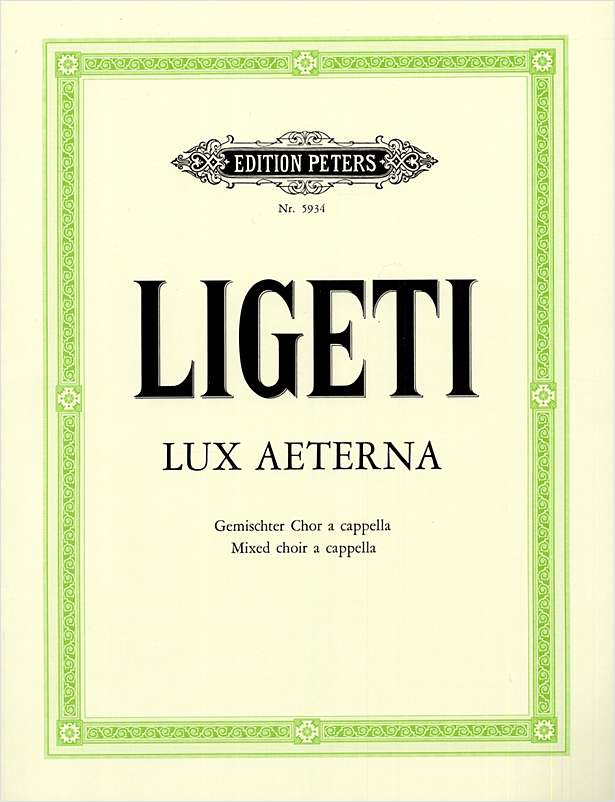
Cover of the Edition Peters sheet music of "Lux aeterna" by György Ligeti.

This is a list of online digital musical document libraries. Each source listed below offers access to collections of digitized music documents (typically originating from printed or manuscript musical sources). They may contain scanned images, fully encoded scores, or encodings designed for music playback (e.g., via MIDI). Some (e.g., KernScores) are adapted for music analysis.

Name	Subject(s)	No. of Items	Description	Provider(s)
19th-Century American Sheet Music at UNC Chapel Hill Music Library	19th-century, American	3,500	Approximately 3,500 popular vocal and instrumental titles from the 1830s to the end of the century. Contains catalog descriptions and digital images of the individual pieces.	University of North Carolina at Chapel Hill
19th-Century California Sheet Music	19th-century, Californian, colour	2,700	Sheet music published in California between 1852 and 1900, along with related materials such as a San Francisco publisher's catalog of 1872, programs, songsheets, advertisements, and photographs. Images of every printed page of sheet music from eleven locations have been scanned at 400 dpi, in color where indicated.	University of California, Berkeley
African American Sheet Music	19th-century, 20th-century, African-American, Broadway, colour, lithographs, movie music, popular music, World Wars, Yiddish-American	250,000	Sheet music, primarily vocal music of American imprint, dating from the 18th century to the present, with most titles in the period 1840–1950.	John Hay Library at Brown University
ART SONG CENTRAL	downloadable, IPA transcriptions, vocal	1,000	Printable sheet music primarily for singers and voice teachers—most downloadable. Emphasis on standard classical and traditional repertoire. IPA transcriptions available for every German, French, Italian and Latin song in the index. Supplementary information on more than 250 songs.	ART SONG CENTRAL
The Ashford Sheet Music Collection	American, Washington	1,000	Largely from and about Washington State and the Pacific Northwest.	University of Washington
Bach digital	Johann Sebastian Bach		Johann Sebastian Bach's autograph manuscripts and original parts. Advanced search options. High-resolution scans. Also contains Bach's copies of works by other composers. Comprises at least 90% of extant Bach manuscripts worldwide. Funding provided by the Deutsche Forschungsgemeinschaft and others.	Berlin State Library – Prussian Cultural Heritage, Saxon State and University Library Dresden, Leipzig Bach-Archiv, Leipzig University Computing Center
Beethoven-Haus Bonn Digital Archives	audio, Beethoven, colour, first editions, letters, pictures	15,300	Links more than 6,100 documents on 37,300 coloured high-quality scans, 1,600 audio files (including music examples and audio letters), and 7,600 text files.	Beethoven-Haus Bonn Digital Archives
Biblioteca Digital Hispanica	Spanish, JPEG		Downloadable color images.	Biblioteca Nacional de España
Biblioteca Nacional Digital Brasil	19th-century, Brazil, sheet music		Sheet music in the Brazilian National Digital Library.	Brazilian National Digital Library
Bodleian Library Broadside Ballads	Britain, broadside ballads	30,000	Printed materials range from the 16th to the 20th Century.	University of Oxford
Brahms-Institut	Johannes Brahms	20,000	RGB tiff images with a resolution of 1,200 dpi (photos) or 400 dpi (autographs, letters, prints, etc.).	Brahms-Institut
The Cantigas de Santa Maria: Facsimiles	black and white, medieval, monophonic		Medieval-era manuscripts written during the reign of Alfonso X "El Sabio" (1221–1284). One of the largest collections of monophonic (solo) songs from the Middle Ages. The To Codex contains roughly the first 100 cantigas, the E Codex all of the cantigas. Illuminations may be found in the E Codex with every 10th cantiga.	Greg Lindahl
The Cello Music Collection of the University of North Carolina at Greensboro	violoncello, cello, manuscript		The largest single holding of cello music–related materials in the world, including annotated sheet music (manuscript and published), monographs, serials, audio/video recordings, personal papers, and artifacts associated with noted cellists.	Martha Blakeney Hodges Special Collections and University Archives, UNCG
Charles H. Templeton Sheet Music Collection	19th-century, 20th-century, American, blues, foxtrots, Irving Berlin, minstrel songs, movie music, popular music, rags, show tunes, war songs	5,000	Sheet music for popular tunes dating as far back as 1865. Items are scanned at 600 dpi and saved as a TIFF files.	Mississippi State University
CHASE research project, University of Leeds, UK	19th- and early 20th-century performing editions of string music	2,000	AHRC-funded research project containing music files viewable on-site or as downloads. Most of the music consists of chamber music and concertos for string instruments, edited and annotated by such players as Ferdinand David, Friedrich Grützmacher, and Joseph Joachim.	University of Leeds Cardiff University
Chopin's First Editions Online	early editions, Frédéric Chopin		All of the first impressions of Chopin's first editions.	Centre for Computing in the Humanities
Chopin Online Catalog	early editions, Frédéric Chopin	85	Scores of early printed editions of Chopin's music works published before 1881, of which 74 are works with opus number and 11 are without.	University of Chicago Library
Classical Music Score Digitization Project (CMSDP)	Common practice period, classical		Publicly editable library of public domain music in standardized, machine-parsable formats such as MusicXML, MuseScore, Sibelius, and Finale. Largest public, centralized repository of fully digitized CPP scores.	Classical Music Score Digitization Project
The Classical String Quartet, 1770–1840	string quartet		Rare and unusual publications of music for string quartet.	Duke University
Codices Electronici Sangallenses (CESG) – Virtual Library	colour, medieval	383	Manuscripts from the medieval codices in the Abbey library of St. Gallen. Downloadable colour PDFs and XML files.	Abbey library of St. Gallen
The Computerized Mensural Music Editing Project	early music, xml score data		High-quality early music scores. Online corpus of electronic editions and associated software tools.	Utrecht University
Contemporary Music Score Collection	contemporary music, global music	5,500	Published in eScholarship, the collection includes digital, open access scores.	UCLA Walter H. Rubsamen Music Library
Digital Image Archive of Medieval Music (DIAMM)	colour, manuscripts, medieval, polyphonic		Images of medieval polyphonic music manuscripts from approximately 800 to 1600. Includes detailed information for all known sources of European polyphonic music (almost entirely vocal), high-resolution colour TIFF images, and links to external images available at other sites.	University of Oxford
Digital Scores from the Collections of the Eda Kuhn Loeb Music Library	19th-century, Bach, libretti, Mozart, opera, Schubert		First and early editions and manuscripts from the 18th and early 19th centuries by J.S. Bach and Bach family members, Mozart, Schubert and other composers. Multiple versions of 19th-century opera scores, seminal works of musical modernism, and music of the Second Viennese School.	Harvard University
The Düben Collection Database Catalogue	17th and early 18th centuries	2,300	Metadata and scanned facsimiles of items in the Düben collection of musical manuscripts and prints from the 17th and early 18th centuries.	Department of Musicology at Uppsala University, Uppsala University Library
e-codices: Virtual Manuscript Library of Switzerland	early modern manuscripts, medieval	659	Medieval and early modern manuscripts from several Swiss libraries, including the Abbey Library of St. Galla.	E-codices
Early Music Online	early music	10,000	Digitised images of over 320 volumes of 16th-century anthologies of printed music, from holdings at the British Library, made available for non-commercial use under JISC's Open Education User Licence.	Royal Holloway University of London
Frances G. Spencer Collection of American Sheet Music	American, popular music	30,000	From the late 18th century to the early 20th century.	Baylor University
Ignaz Pleyel Early Editions	chamber music, French, Ignaz Pleyel, keyboard music	200	Early printed and manuscript scores of the French composer and music publisher Ignaz Pleyel (1757–1831). Includes arrangements of large orchestral works published within the composer's lifetime.	University of Iowa
IN Harmony: Sheet Music from Indiana	downloadable sheet music, open source software	129,400	Sheet music and open-source sheet music cataloging software.	Indiana University Lilly Library, the Indiana State Library, the Indiana State Museum, and the Indiana Historical Society
International Music Score Library Project (IMSLP)		799,000	Public domain music scores (720,000) and recordings (79,000), including some contemporary composers.	International Music Score Library Project
Inventions of Note	popular music, technology	50	Sheet music for popular songs and piano compositions, mostly 1890–1920.	Lewis Music Library at MIT
Jean-Baptiste Lully Collection	17th-century, 18th-century, French, Jean-Baptiste Lully	30	Rare 17th- and 18th-century scores of operas, ballets, and compilations by the French composer Jean-Baptiste Lully and his sons.	University of North Texas Music Library
Juilliard Manuscript Collection	Beethoven, Brahms, Mozart	138	Autograph manuscripts, sketches, engravers' proofs, and first editions.	The Juilliard School
KernScores	classical		Scanned graphical music scores (separated by movement), with manually corrected OMR data: Beethoven piano sonatas edited by Paul Dukas. Édition classique a Durand & fils, No. 9327. 1915.; Mozart piano sonatas from the Alte Mozart-Ausgabe: Wolfgang Amadeus Mozarts Werke. Kritisch durchgesehene Gesammtausgabe (volume 20 [1878]). Breitkopf & Härtel, Leipzig; 1877–1883.; Selected Haydn keyboard sonatas (partial OMR) 34 harpsichord/pianoforte sonatas from the first four volumes published by Universal Edition (1901).; D. Scarlatti keyboard sonatas (partial OMR) Edited by Alessandro Longo (Ricordi, 1906–1913).	Center for Computer Assisted Research in the Humanities
Laborde Chansonnier	15th-century, manuscript, mensural, sacred, Octavo		One book of music from Rare Book Room, which contains digitized books of many types. Laborde Chansonnier – ca. 1470 – Unknown, (author) – France – Library of Congress, Music Division	Rare Book Room of the Library of Congress
Lester S. Levy Collection of Sheet Music	19th-century, American, minstrel music, popular music, war songs	29,000	American popular music spanning the years 1780–1980.	Johns Hopkins University
Library and Archives Canada: Sheet Music From Canada's Past	Canadian, popular music	20,000	Patriotic and parlour songs, piano pieces, sacred music, and novelty numbers published from before 1900 to 1920. Includes Canadian imprints and music by Canadians or about Canada published anywhere in the world.	Library and Archives Canada
The Library of Congress: Historic American Sheet Music: 1850–1920	American	3,042	19th and early 20th-century American sheet music drawn from the Rare Book, Manuscript, and Special Collections Library at Duke University.	The Library of Congress
The Library of Congress: Music for the Nation: American Sheet Music 1870–1885	19th-century, American	62,500	Historical sheet music registered for copyright, including more than 15,000 registered during the years 1820–1860 and more than 47,000 during the years 1870–1885. Includes popular songs, operatic arias, piano music, sacred and secular choral music, solo instrumental music, method books and instructional materials, and music for band and orchestra.	The Library of Congress
The Library of Congress: The Moldenhauer Archives	Western music	130	Representative examples documenting the history of Western music from the medieval period through the modern era, including many complete works.	The Library of Congress
Medieval Music Database	medieval		Four complete manuscripts, a gradual, and three antiphonals.	La Trobe University
MuseData	classical		Graphical Scores and originating data for: Archangelo Corelli, complete published works, Opp. 1–6 (72 works); Ludwig van Beethoven, complete symphonies, selected string quartets; Antonio Vivaldi, concerti grossi; other works (Bach, Handel, Haydn, Marcello, Mozart, Rovetta, Teleman)	Center for Computer Assisted Research in the Humanities
Music Australia – Australia's Music: Online, in Time	Australian music	11,318	Music made and played by Australians, most published before 1930. Medium-resolution scans. PDFs available.	National Library of Australia
Music in the Manuscripts of Bibliothèque Interuniversitaire Médecine of Montpellier	medieval			Bibliothèque Interuniversitaire Médecine of Montpellier
Music Library Digital Scores Collection	17-19th century	45	Manuscript musical scores dating from the 17th through 19th centuries—mostly 17th and 18th century operas, opera excerpts, and other vocal music.	University of Washington
Music Manuscripts Online	classical	900	High-quality images and descriptions of music manuscripts.	The Morgan Library & Museum
Musica Brasilis	Brazilian music	1,000	Music scores by Brazilian composers.	Musica Brasilis initiative
Neue Mozart-Ausgabe: Digitized Version	Mozart		Musical text and critical commentaries of the entire Neue Mozart-Ausgabe.	Internationale Stiftung Mozarteum, Packard Humanities Institute
Open Music Score	classical		Public domain music scores provided by the user community in MusicXML format.	Open Music Score
Penn in Hand	facsimile, manuscripts		Bibliographic information and digital facsimiles for selected collections of manuscript codices, texts, documents, papers, and leaves held by the University of Pennsylvania's Rare Book & Manuscript Library in the Kislak Center for Special Collections, Rare Books, and Manuscripts, as well as those privately owned by Lawrence J. Schoenberg (C53, WG56).	University of Pennsylvania
Project Gutenberg: The Sheet Music Project	scores, sheet music			Project Gutenberg Literary Archive Foundation
Raphael Project	Renaissance		Colour photos, not downloadable.	Raphael Project
Répertoire International des Sources Musicales (RISM)	music manuscripts, printed music, libretti, music treatises	59,000	Searchable database of over 1.2 million historical musical sources, with a focus on the period between 1600 and 1850. When available, links are included to digitized items in the holding institution's repository.	RISM, Bavarian State Library, Berlin State Library
Sheet Music Consortium	metadata harvesting	120,300	Open collection of digitized sheet music, using the Open Archives Initiative: Protocol for Metadata Harvesting (OAI:PMH). Collections Indexed: Library of Congress, Music Division – 47,528 records; Rare Book, Manuscript, and Special Collections Library, Duke University – 20,157 records; Lilly Library, Indiana University – 17,937 records; Maine Music Box – 11,779 records; Lester Levy Collection, Johns Hopkins University – 11,590 records; National Library of Australia – 6,731 records; UCLA Music Library – 4,593 records	Sheet Music Consortium
Sibley Music Library	18th-century, French, opera	8,643	Public domain scores and books.	Eastman School of Music at the University of Rochester
Spohr-Briefe	19th-century, German	6,000	Letters from and to the composer, violinist and conductor Louis Spohr	Spohr Museum
Tablature in PDF and PostScript	lute, tab	75	Lute music available in EPS, PDF, MIDI, or TAB format.	Wayne Cripps of Dartmouth College
Tomas Luis de Victoria	editions, manuscripts, prints, Renaissance, Victoria		Prints and editions of Victoria, Morales, and some other Spanish composers.	University of Málaga
A Traditional Music Library	folk music, sheet music	60,000	Traditional and folk music from around the world. Includes downloadable PDF scores and MIDI backing tracks for many of the songs.	Rod Smith (musician)
Vatican Exhibit Main Hall: Music	Renaissance	23	Colour JPEGs of Renaissance manuscripts.	ibiblio
Ville de Laon: Bibliothèque Municipale	Renaissance		Music from the 9th to 15th centuries.	Ville de Laon: Bibliothèque Municipale
Virtual Music Rare Book Room	18th-century, French, opera		Emphasis on 18th-century French opera.	University of North Texas

== See also ==
- Virtual Library of Musicology
- List of online music databases
