= EOSDIS =

NASA program capability

The Earth Observing System Data and Information System (EOSDIS) provides broad access to a comprehensive set of earth science data and information collected from terrestrial and space-based assets. EOSDIS provides User Support, Data Archive, Management and Distribution, Information Management, and Product Generation for casual users and research scientists from the United States and international communities. EOSDIS is a core function delivered by NASA's Earth Science Data Systems Program and is executed by the NASA Earth Science Data and Information System (ESDIS) Project.

== Overview ==
EOSDIS ingests, processes, archives, and distributes data from a large number of Earth-observing satellites and provides end-to-end capabilities for managing NASA's Earth science data from various sources – satellites, aircraft, field measurements, and various other programs. For the Earth Observing System (EOS) satellite missions, EOSDIS provides capabilities for command and control, scheduling, data capture and initial (Level 0) processing.

EOSDIS Mission Operations are managed by the NASA Earth Science Mission Operations (ESMO) project. NASA network capabilities transport the data to the science operations facilities. EOSDIS comprises processing facilities and Distributed Active Archive Centers across the United States. These processing facilities and DAACs serve hundreds of thousands of users worldwide, providing hundreds of millions of data files each year covering many Earth science disciplines.

The remaining capabilities of EOSDIS constitute the EOSDIS Science Operations, which are managed by the Earth Science Data and Information System (ESDIS) Project. These capabilities include: generating higher-level (Level 1-4) science data products for EOS missions; archiving and distributing data products from EOS and other satellite missions, and aircraft and field measurement campaigns. The EOSDIS science operations are performed within a distributed system of many interconnected nodes that include science investigator-led processing systems and discipline-specific Earth science Distributed Active Archive Centers with specific responsibilities for producing, archiving, and distributing data Earth science data products. The Distributed Active Archive Centers serve a large and diverse user community (as indicated by EOSDIS performance metrics) by providing capabilities to search and access science data products and specialized services.

== History ==
From early 1980 through 1986, NASA supported pilot data system studies to assess the feasibility and development of publicly accessible electronic data systems. Part of the congressional approval of the EOS mission in 1990 included the NASA Earth Science Enterprise, which supported the development of a long-term data and information system (EOSDIS). This system would be accessible to the science research community and the broader public, built on a distributed open architecture. With these functional requirements for space operations control and product generation for EOS, the EOSDIS would also be responsible for the data archival, management, and distribution of all NASA Earth science mission instrument data during the mission life.

The EOSDIS project, as of September 2012, reported it contained approximately 10 PB of data in its database, with ingestion of approximately 8.5 TB daily. By September 2025, the EOSDIS archives contained approximately 178 PB of data and was ingesting 160 TB per day.

In early 2026, NASA announced that it was moving its Earth Sciences dataset archives to the cloud, an effort that will progress throughout 2026. Key components of the EOSDIS system will be developed and operate in the Earthdata Cloud solution.

== Methods of Search ==
=== Distributed Active Archive Centers ===
EOSDIS Distributed Active Archive Centers are custodians of EOS data, provide long-term storage and preservation, and ensure that users can easily access data. Their specific Earth system science discipline distinguishes each center. In addition to the search-and-order capabilities provided by the Global Change Master Directory (GCMD) and the Common Metadata Repository (or CMR, which has replaced the former EOS Clearinghouse, or ECHO), the Distributed Active Archive Centers have individual online systems that allow them to provide unique services for users of a particular type of data. The center-specific systems emphasize data products, services, and data-handling tools unique to the DAAC.

=== Global Change Master Directory ===
The Global Change Master Directory (GCMD) is a directory for Earth science data and services. The GCMD database currently has more than 30,000 Earth science data sets and service descriptions covering all aspects of Earth and environmental sciences. One can use the search box or select from the available keywords to search for data and services.

=== Common Metadata Repository (CMR) ===
Formerly known as the EOS ClearingHouse (ECHO), CMR is a metadata catalog of NASA's EOS data and a registry for related data services (e.g., reformatting, pattern recognition). CMR's catalog contains over 3,200 data sets held at 12 EOSDIS DAACs. Users can access the data and services by using general or community-tailored clients that access CMR using a series of Application Program Interfaces (APIs) defined using web services.

=== Earthdata Search ===
Earthdata Search replaced Reverb as EOSDIS's web-based client for discovering and ordering cross-disciplinary data from CMR's metadata holdings in January 2018. Earthdata Search allows users, including those without specific knowledge of the data, to search science data holdings, retrieve high-level descriptions of data sets and detailed descriptions of the data inventory, view browse images, and submit orders via CMR to the appropriate data providers. Cross-DAAC searches through Earthdata Search use the Common Metadata Repository (CMR).

== Distributed Active Archive Centers ==
A Distributed Active Archive Center (DAAC) is a part of EOSDIS. DAACs process, archive, document, and distribute data from NASA's past and current Earth Observing System (EOS) satellites and field measurement programs. Each of the twelve DAACs serves one or more specific Earth science disciplines and provides its user community with data products, data information, user services, and tools unique to its particular science.

The following is a list of DAACs and data specializations:

- Alaska Satellite Facility (ASF) DAAC: Synthetic Aperture Radar (SAR) data, sea ice, polar processes, geophysics.
- Atmospheric Science Data Center (ASDC): radiation budget, clouds, aerosols, tropospheric chemistry.
- Crustal Dynamics Data Information System (CDDIS): satellite geodesy.
- Global Hydrometeorology Resource Center (GHRC) DAAC: severe weather interactions, lightning, atmospheric convection.
- Goddard Earth Sciences Data and Information Services Center (GES DISC): global precipitation, solar irradiance, atmospheric composition, atmospheric dynamics, global modeling.
- Land Processes DAAC (LP DAAC): surface reflectivity, land cover, vegetation indices.
- Level 1 Atmosphere Archive and Distribution System (LAADS) DAAC]: radiance, atmosphere.
- National Snow and Ice Data Center (NSIDC): snow, ice, cryosphere, climate.
- Oak Ridge National Laboratory (ORNL) DAAC: biogeochemical dynamics, terrestrial ecology, carbon and nitrogen cycle, environmental processes.
- Ocean Biology DAAC (OB.DAAC): ocean biology, ocean color, ocean biogeochemistry, sea surface temperature.
- Physical Oceanography DAAC (PO DAAC): sea surface temperature, ocean winds, circulation and currents, topography and gravity.
- Socioeconomic Data and Applications Data Center (SEDAC): human interactions, land use, environmental sustainability, geospatial data, multilateral environmental agreements.

== See also ==
- ECHO Clearinghouse
- Global Change Master Directory
- Goddard Space Flight Center
