= Doppler radar =

Type of radar equipment

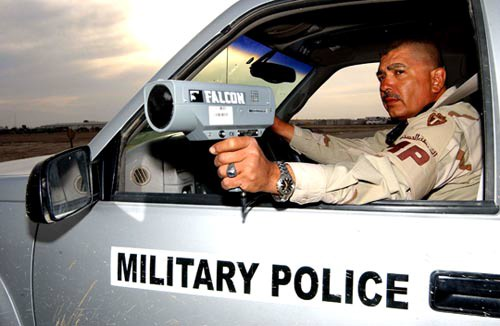
U.S. Army soldier using a radar gun, an application of Doppler radar, to catch speeding violators.

A Doppler radar is a specialized radar that uses the Doppler effect to produce velocity data about objects at a distance. It does this by bouncing a microwave signal off a desired target and analyzing how the object's motion has altered the frequency of the returned signal. This variation gives direct and highly accurate measurements of the radial component of a target's velocity relative to the radar. The term applies to radar systems in many domains like aviation, police radar detectors, navigation, meteorology, etc.

== Concept ==
=== Doppler effect ===
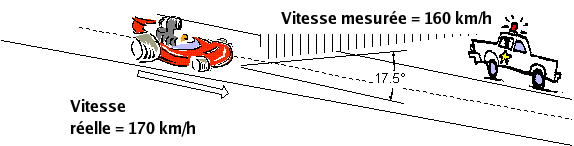
The emitted signal toward the car is reflected back with a variation of frequency that depends on the speed away/toward the radar (160 km/h). This is only a component of the real speed (170 km/h).

The Doppler effect (or Doppler shift), named after Austrian physicist Christian Doppler who proposed it in 1842, is the difference between the observed frequency and the emitted frequency of a wave for an observer moving relative to the source of the waves. It is commonly heard when a vehicle sounding a siren approaches, passes and recedes from an observer. The received frequency is higher (compared to the emitted frequency) during the approach, it is identical at the instant of passing by, and it is lower during the recession. This variation of frequency also depends on the direction the wave source is moving with respect to the observer; it is at a maximum when the source is moving directly toward or away from the observer and diminishes with increasing angle between the direction of motion and the direction of the waves, until when the source is moving at right angles to the observer, there is no shift.

Imagine a baseball pitcher throwing one ball every second to a catcher (a frequency of 1 ball per second). Assuming the balls travel at a constant velocity and the pitcher is stationary, the catcher catches one ball every second. However, if the pitcher is jogging towards the catcher, the catcher catches balls more frequently because the balls are less spaced out (the frequency increases). The inverse is true if the pitcher is moving away from the catcher. The catcher catches balls less frequently because of the pitcher's backward motion (the frequency decreases). If the pitcher moves at an angle, but at the same speed, the frequency variation at which the receiver catches balls is less, as the distance between the two changes more slowly.

From the point of view of the pitcher, the frequency remains constant (whether he's throwing balls or transmitting microwaves). Since with electromagnetic radiation like microwaves or with sound, frequency is inversely proportional to wavelength, the wavelength of the waves is also affected. Thus, the relative difference in velocity between a source and an observer is what gives rise to the Doppler effect.

=== Frequency variation ===
Doppler Effect: Change of wavelength and frequency caused by motion of the source.

The formula for radar Doppler shift is the same as that for reflection of light by a moving mirror. There is no need to invoke Albert Einstein's theory of special relativity, because all observations are made in the same frame of reference. The result derived with c as the speed of light and v as the target radial velocity gives the shifted frequency ($f_r$) as a function of the original frequency ($f_t$) :

$$f_r = f_t \left( \frac{1+v/c}{1-v/c} \right)$$

which simplifies to

$$f_r = f_t \left( \frac{c+v}{c-v} \right)$$

The "beat frequency", (Doppler frequency) ($f_d$), is thus:

$$f_d = f_r-f_t = 2v \frac {f_t}{(c-v)}$$

Since for most practical applications of radar, $v \ll c$, so $\left(c-v\right) \rightarrow c$. We can then write:

$$f_d \approx 2v \frac {f_t}{c}$$

=== Technology ===
There are four ways of producing the Doppler effect. Radars may be:

- Coherent pulsed (CP),
- Pulse-Doppler radar,
- Continuous wave (CW), or
- Frequency modulation (FM).

Doppler allows the use of narrow band receiver filters that reduce or eliminate signals from slow moving and stationary objects. This effectively eliminates false signals produced by trees, clouds, insects, birds, wind, and other environmental influences but various inexpensive hand held Doppler radar devices not using this may produce erroneous measurements.

CW Doppler radar only provides a velocity output as the received signal from the target is compared in frequency with the original signal. Early Doppler radars included CW, but these quickly led to the development of frequency modulated continuous wave (FMCW) radar, which sweeps the transmitter frequency to encode and determine range.

With the advent of digital techniques, Pulse-Doppler radars (PD) became light enough for aircraft use, and Doppler processors for coherent pulse radars became more common. That provides Look-down/shoot-down capability. The advantage of combining Doppler processing with pulse radars is to provide accurate velocity information. This velocity is called range-rate. It describes the rate that a target moves toward or away from the radar. A target with no range-rate reflects a frequency near the transmitter frequency and cannot be detected. The classic zero doppler target is one which is on a heading that is tangential to the radar antenna beam. Basically, any target that is heading 90 degrees in relation to the antenna beam cannot be detected by its velocity (only by its conventional reflectivity).

Ultra-wideband waveforms have been investigated by the U.S. Army Research Laboratory (ARL) as a potential approach to Doppler processing due to its low average power, high resolution, and object-penetrating ability. While investigating the feasibility of whether UWB radar technology can incorporate Doppler processing to estimate the velocity of a moving target when the platform is stationary, a 2013 ARL report highlighted issues related to target range migration. However, researchers have suggested that these issues can be alleviated if the correct matched filter is used.

In military airborne applications, the Doppler effect has 2 main advantages. Firstly, the radar is more robust against counter-measure. Return signals from weather, terrain, and countermeasures like chaff are filtered out before detection, which reduces computer and operator loading in hostile environments. Secondly, against a low altitude target, filtering on the radial speed is a very effective way to eliminate the ground clutter that always has a null speed. Low-flying military plane with countermeasure alert for hostile radar track acquisition can turn perpendicular to the hostile radar to nullify its Doppler frequency, which usually breaks the lock and drives the radar off by hiding against the ground return which is much larger.

== History ==
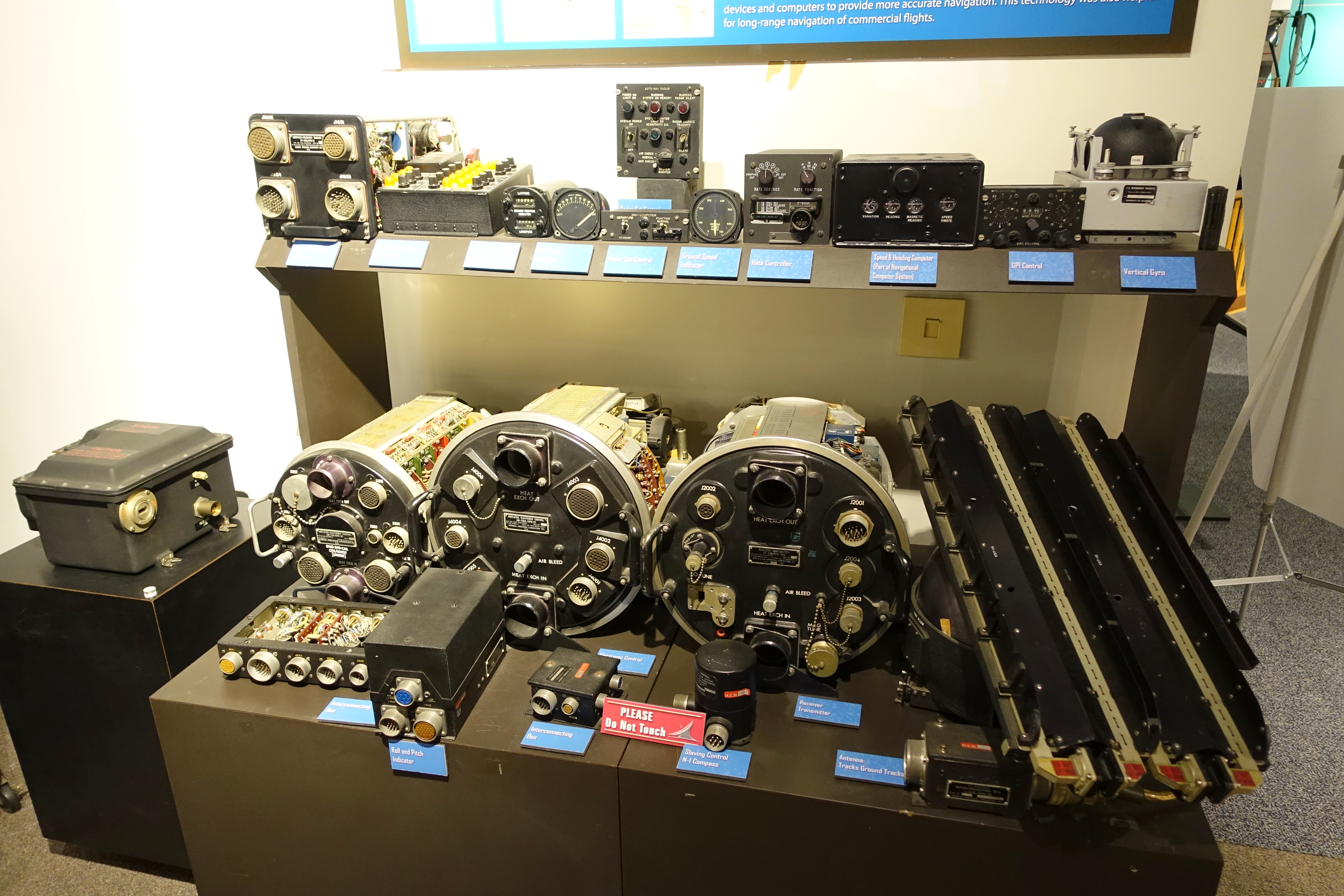
AN/APN-81 Doppler radar navigation system, mid-1950s

Doppler radar tends to be lightweight because it eliminates heavy pulse hardware. The associated filtering removes stationary reflections while integrating signals over a longer time span, which improves range performance while reducing power. The military applied these advantages during the 1940s.

Continuous-broadcast, or FM, radar was developed during World War II for United States Navy aircraft, to support night combat operation. Most used the UHF spectrum and had a transmit Yagi antenna on the port wing and a receiver Yagi antenna on the starboard wing. This enabled bombers to fly an optimum speed when approaching ship targets, and let escort fighter aircraft train guns on enemy aircraft during night operation. These strategies were adapted to semi-active radar homing.

In 1951, Carl A. Wiley invented synthetic-aperture radar, which, though distinct from mainstream Doppler radar, was based on Doppler principles, and originally patented as "Pulsed Doppler Radar Methods and Means," #3,196,436.

Modern Doppler systems are light enough for mobile ground surveillance associated with infantry and surface ships. These detect motion from vehicles and personnel for night and all weather combat operation. Modern police radar guns are a smaller, more portable version of these systems.

Early Doppler radar sets relied on large analog filters to achieve acceptable performance. Analog filters, waveguide, and amplifiers pick up vibration like microphones, so bulky vibration damping is required. That extra weight imposed unacceptable kinematic performance limitations that restricted aircraft use to night operation, heavy weather, and heavy jamming environments until the 1970s.

Digital fast Fourier transform (FFT) filtering became practical when modern microprocessors became available during the 1970s. This was immediately connected to coherent pulsed radars, where velocity information was extracted. This proved useful in both weather and air traffic control radars. The velocity information provided another input to the software tracker, and improved computer tracking. Because of the low pulse repetition frequency (PRF) of most coherent pulsed radars, which maximizes the coverage in range, the amount of Doppler processing is limited. The Doppler processor can only process velocities up to ±1/2 the PRF of the radar. This is not a problem for weather radars. Velocity information for aircraft cannot be extracted directly from low-PRF radar because sampling restricts measurements to about 75 miles per hour.

Specialized radars quickly were developed when digital techniques became lightweight and more affordable. Pulse-Doppler radars combine all the benefits of long range and high velocity capability. Pulse-Doppler radars use a medium to high PRF (on the order of 3 to 30 kHz), which allows for the detection of either high-speed targets or high-resolution velocity measurements. Normally it is one or the other; a radar designed for detecting targets from zero to Mach 2 does not have a high resolution in speed, while a radar designed for high-resolution velocity measurements does not have a wide range of speeds. Weather radars are high-resolution velocity radars, while air defense radars have a large range of velocity detection, but the accuracy in velocity is in the tens of knots.

Antenna designs for the CW and FM-CW started out as separate transmit and receive antennas before the advent of affordable microwave designs. In the late 1960s, traffic radars began being produced which used a single antenna. This was made possible by the use of circular polarization and a multi-port waveguide section operating at X band. By the late 1970s this changed to linear polarization and the use of ferrite circulators at both X and K bands. PD radars operate at too high a PRF to use a transmit-receive gas filled switch, and most use solid-state devices to protect the receiver low-noise amplifier when the transmitter is fired.

== Applications ==
Doppler radars are used in aviation, sounding satellites, Major League Baseball's StatCast system, meteorology, radar guns, radiology and healthcare (fall detection and risk assessment, nursing or clinic purpose), and bistatic radar (surface-to-air missiles).

=== Weather ===
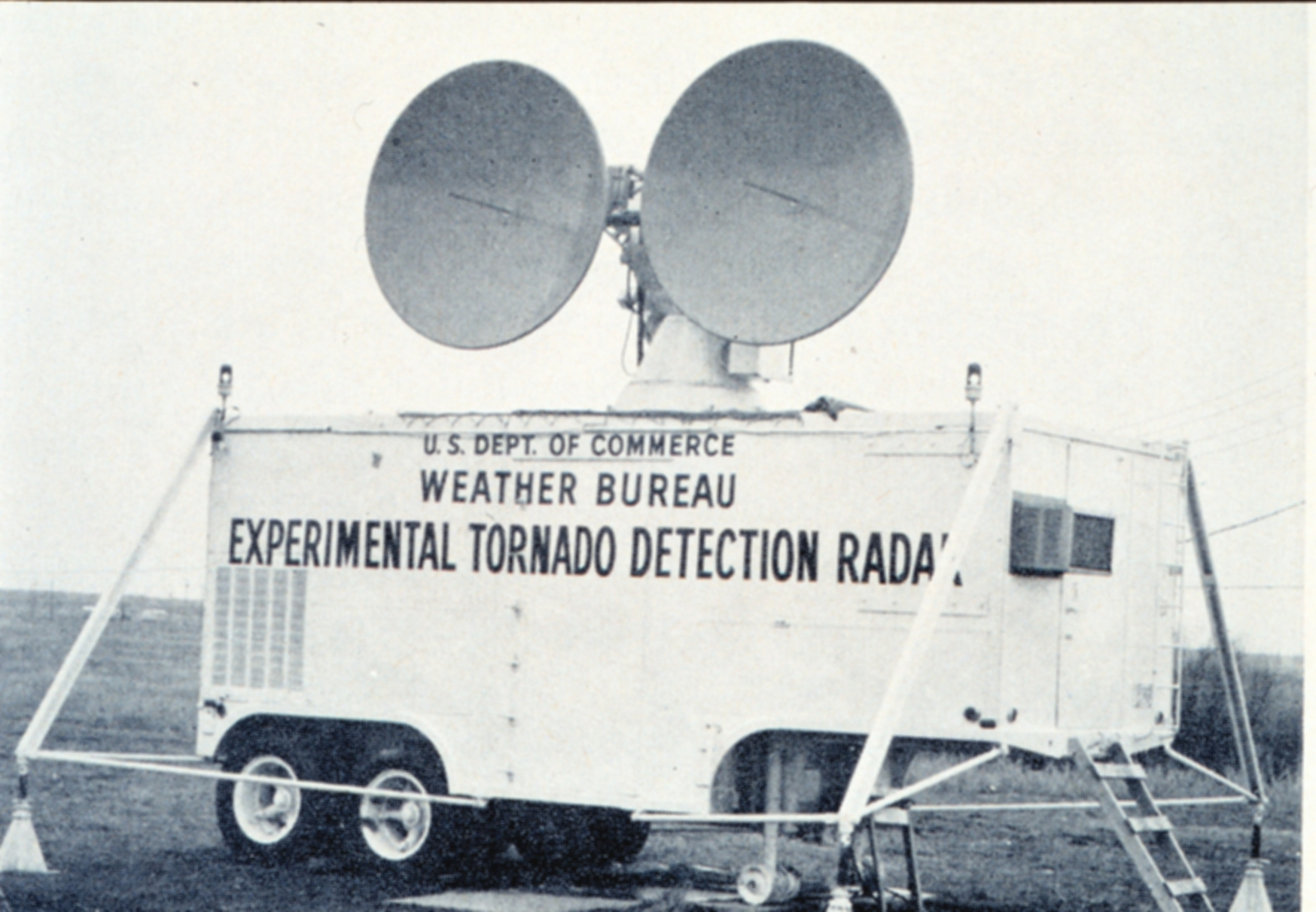
The US Weather Bureau's first experimental Doppler weather radar unit was obtained from the US Navy in the 1950s

Partly because of its common use by television meteorologists in on-air weather reporting, the specific term "Doppler Radar" has erroneously become popularly synonymous with the type of radar used in meteorology. Most modern weather radars use the pulse-Doppler technique to examine the motion of precipitation, but it is only a part of the processing of their data. So, while these radars use a highly specialized form of Doppler radar, this type of radar is much broader in its meaning and its applications.

The work on the Doppler function for weather radar has a long history in many countries. In June 1958, American researchers David Holmes and Robert Smith were able to detect the rotation of a tornado using the mobile continuous-wave radar (photo to the right). Norman's laboratory, which later became the National Severe Storms Laboratory (NSSL), modified this radar to make it a pulsed Doppler radar allowing more easily to know the position of the echoes and having a greater power

The work was accelerated after such event in the United States as the 1974 Super Outbreak when 148 tornadoes roared through thirteen states. The reflectivity only radar of the time could only locate the precipitation structure of the thunderclouds but not the mesocyclonic rotation and divergence of winds leading to the development of tornadoes or downbursts. The NSSL Doppler became operational in 1971 and led to the NEXRAD network being deployed at the end of the 1980s.

=== Navigation ===
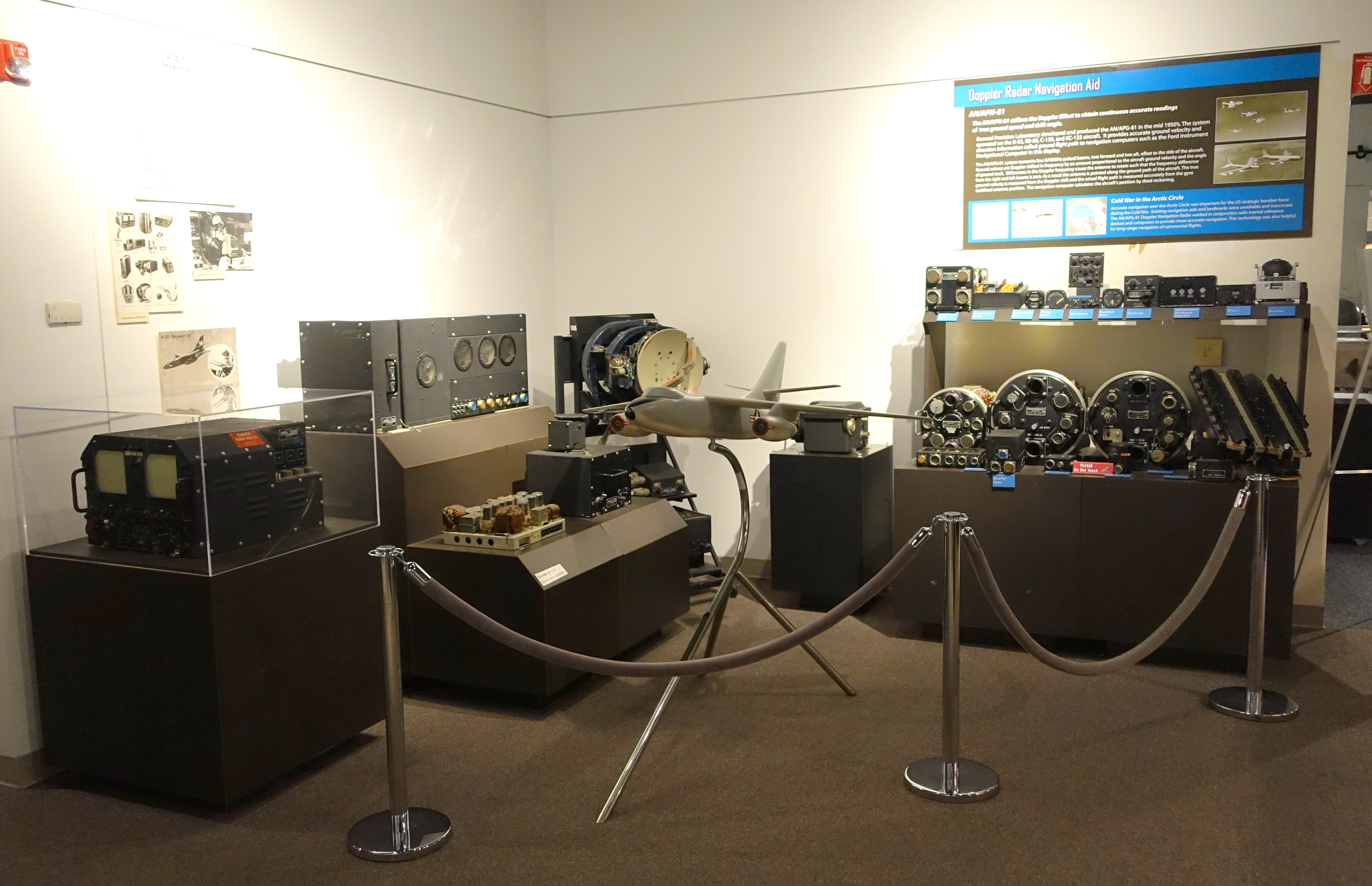
Doppler navigation system in the National Electronics Museum

Doppler radars were used as a navigation aid for aircraft and spacecraft. By directly measuring the movement of the ground with the radar, and then comparing this to the airspeed returned from the aircraft instruments, the wind speed could be accurately determined for the first time. This value was then used for highly accurate dead reckoning. One early example of such a system was the Green Satin radar used in the English Electric Canberra. This system sent a pulsed signal at a very low repetition rate so it could use a single antenna to transmit and receive. An oscillator held the reference frequency for comparison to the received signal. In practice, the initial "fix" was taken using a radio navigation system, normally Gee, and the Green Satin then provided accurate long-distance navigation beyond Gee's 350-mile range. Similar systems were used in a number of aircraft of the era, and were combined with the main search radars of fighter designs by the 1960s.

Doppler navigation was in common commercial aviation use in the 1960s until it was largely superseded by inertial navigation systems. The equipment consisted of a transmitter/receiver unit, a processing unit and a gyro stabilised antenna platform. The antenna generated four beams and was rotated by a servo mechanism to align with the aircraft's track by equalising the Doppler shift from the left and right hand antennas. A synchro transmitted the platform angle to the flight deck, thus providing a measure of 'drift angle'. The ground speed was determined from the Doppler shift between the forward and aft facing beams. These were displayed on the flight deck on single instrument. Some aircraft had an additional 'Doppler Computer'. This was a mechanical device containing a steel ball rotated by a motor whose speed was controlled by the Doppler determined ground speed. The angle of this motor was controlled by the 'drift angle'. Two fixed wheels, one 'fore and aft' the other 'left to right' drove counters to output distance along track and across track difference. The aircraft's compass was integrated into the computer so that a desired track could be set between two waypoints on an over water great circle route. It was a great improvement over other 'dead reckoning' methods available at the time. It was generally backed up with position fixes from Loran, VORs, NDBs, or as a last resort sextant and chronometer. It was possible to cross the Atlantic with an error of a couple of miles when in range of a couple of VORs or NDBs. Its major shortcoming in practice was the sea state, as a calm sea gave poor radar returns and hence unreliable Doppler measurements. But this was infrequent on the North Atlantic

==== Locus-based navigation ====
Location-based Doppler techniques were also used in the U.S. Navy's historical Transit satellite navigation system, with satellite transmitters and ground-based receivers, and are currently used in the civilian Argos system, which uses satellite receivers and ground-based transmitters. In these cases, the ground stations are either stationary or slow-moving, and the Doppler offset being measured is caused by the relative motion between the ground station and the fast-moving satellite. The combination of Doppler offset and reception time can be used to generate a locus of locations that would have the measured offset at that intersects the Earth's surface at that moment: by combining this with other loci from measurements at other times, the true location of the ground station can be determined accurately.

==== Unmanned aerial vehicle detection ====
A notable example of utilizing Doppler information is in the detection and classification of small unmanned aerial vehicles. Radar systems operating at extremely high frequency offer enhanced Doppler resolution for a given coherent processing interval. This increased resolution allows access to micro-Doppler signatures (MDSs), where micro-Doppler refers to Doppler modulations caused by the oscillatory movement of a target's structural components, in contrast to bulk Doppler, which relates to the overall motion of the target. Typically, UAVs have rotating blades that generate distinctive MDSs, enabling effective target discrimination between UAVs and other airborne objects, such as birds.

== See also ==
- Continuous-wave radar – Type of radar where a known stable frequency continuous wave radio energy is transmitted
- Semi-active radar homing – Type of missile guidance system
