= Andrew Wathey =

Vice Chancellor

Andrew Brian Wathey CBE FRHistS FRSA (born 19 July 1958) was the Vice-Chancellor of Northumbria University from 2008 to May 2022. He now holds the role of Chair of the National Archives’ Board.

== Biography ==
Wathey was educated at St Edmund Hall, Oxford, where he graduated with a BA in music in 1979, and MA in 1983 and a doctorate in music (DPhil) in 1987. In 1999 he became Professor of Music History at Royal Holloway, University of London, where he had taught since 1989. He was Senior Vice Principal at Royal Holloway from 2006 until 2008.

In September 2008, he became the fourth Vice-Chancellor of Northumbria University.

He left Northumbria University in May 2022, succeeded by Professor Andy Long. He now holds the position of Chair of the National Archives’ Board, which he has held since April 2022. Wathey is a co-founder of the Digital Image Archive of Medieval Music.

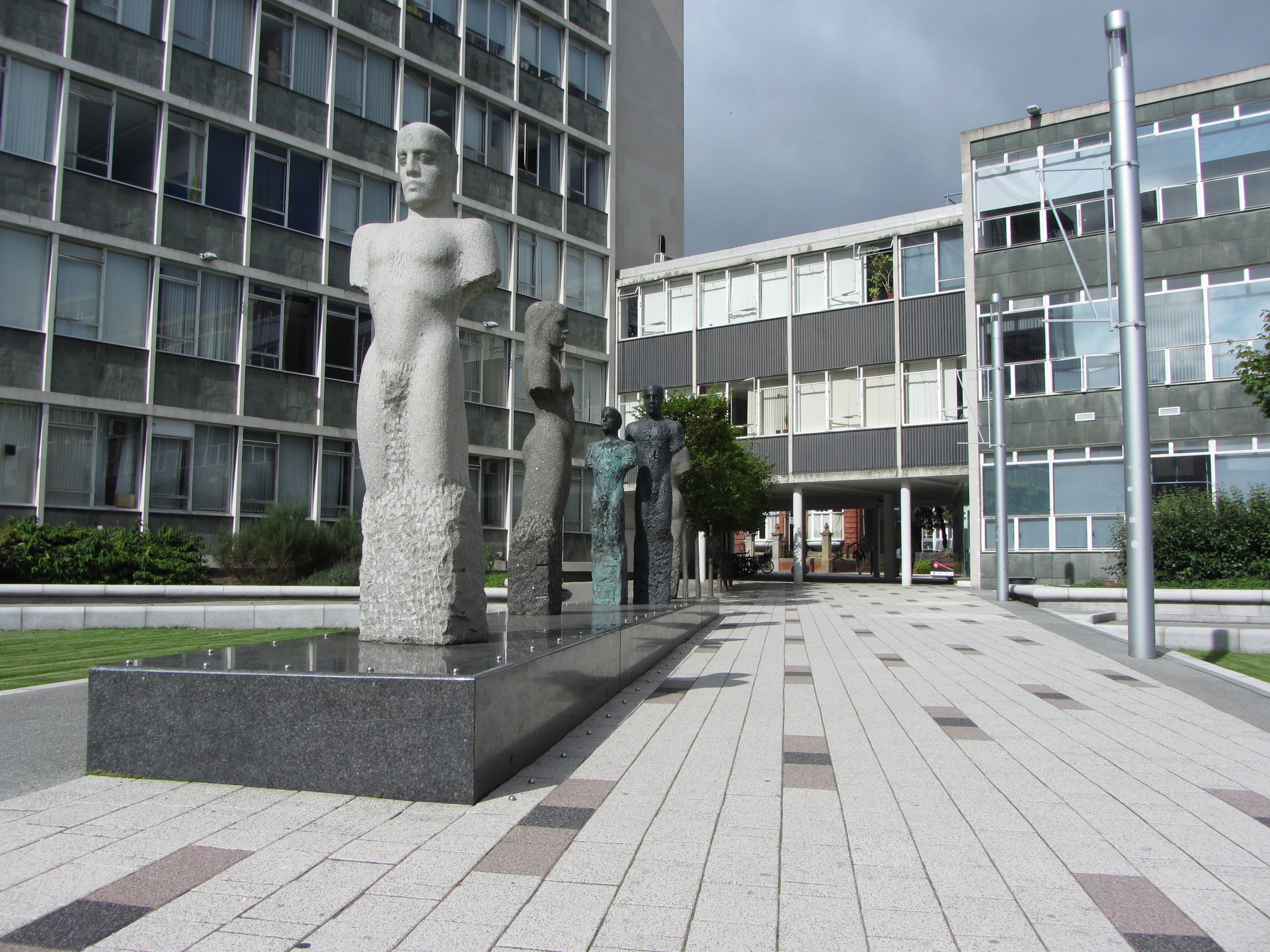
Northumbria University

In July 2022, he was awarded an Honorary Doctor of Civil Law by Northumbria University in recognition of his contribution to the university, The North East and the HE sector as a whole.

== Personal life ==
He was appointed a CBE in the 2016 New Year Honours. He married in 1995. He became an FRSA in 2005, and an FRHistS in 1986.

Academic offices
Preceded by Kel Fidler	Vice Chancellor of Northumbria University; September 2008 - May 2022	Succeeded by Andy Long
