= Global Change Master Directory =

The Global Change Master Directory (GCMD) keywords are a hierarchical set of controlled vocabularies in Earth science. The GCMD is one of NASA’s contributions to the international Committee on Earth Observation Satellites (CEOS), where the GCMD is coordinated by the International Directory Network (IDN) Interest Group. The GCMD was deprecated by NASA’s Earth Science Data and Information System (ESDIS) Project in June 2020.

== See also ==
- Earth Observing System Data and Information System (EOSDIS)
- Climate change
- OPeNDAP
- Ozone
- Sunspot
- Geospatial metadata
- Solar variation
- IDN
