= OPS 3762 =

American reconnaissance satellite launched in 1964

- Mission type: Radar imaging
- Operator: US National Reconnaissance Office
- COSPAR ID: 1964-087A
- SATCAT no.: 00964
- Mission duration: 4 days

Spacecraft properties
- Spacecraft type: Quill
- Bus: Agena-D
- Manufacturer: Boeing; Goodyear; ERIM; Lockheed (Agena)
- Launch mass: 1,500 kilograms (3,300 lb)

Start of mission
- Launch date: 21 December 1964, 19:08:56 UTC
- Rocket: TAT SLV-2A Agena-D 425
- Launch site: Vandenberg LC-75-1-1

End of mission
- Deactivated: December 1964
- Decay date: 11 January 1965

Orbital parameters
- Reference system: Geocentric
- Regime: Low Earth
- Eccentricity: 0.00196
- Perigee altitude: 238 kilometers (148 mi)
- Apogee altitude: 264 kilometers (164 mi)
- Inclination: 70.1 degrees
- Period: 89.4 minutes
- Epoch: 21 December 1964, 14:12:00 UTC

Instruments
- SLAR

OPS 3762, also known as FTV-2355, was an American reconnaissance satellite which was launched in 1964. It was the first radar imaging satellite to be launched, and the only Quill spacecraft to fly. Its mission was to demonstrate radar imaging techniques for future missions. However, the programme was cancelled before any more satellites were launched.

OPS 3762 was successfully launched aboard a Thrust Augmented Thor SLV-2A Agena-D carrier rocket, flying from Launch Complex 75-1-1 at the Vandenberg Air Force Base. The launch, which was the last orbital launch of the year, occurred at 19:08:56 UTC on 21 December 1964, and successfully placed the spacecraft into the low Earth orbit in which it conducted its mission. Owing to concerns that using radar over the Soviet Union may have been seen as provocative, OPS 3762 conducted imaging tests over the Northwestern United States instead.

OPS 3762 was a 1,500 kilograms (3,300 lb) spacecraft, based on the Agena-D which also served as the upper stage of its carrier rocket. It operated for four days. Its orbit had a perigee of 208 kilometres (129 mi), an apogee of 222 kilometres (138 mi), 70 degrees of inclination, and an orbital period of 88.8 minutes. Its side looking airborne radar produced images, which were returned in a KH-4 film capsule at the end of the mission. OPS 3762 itself remained in orbit until 11 January 1965, when its orbit decayed and it reentered the atmosphere. OPS 3762 completed its mission successfully.

== See also ==
- 1964 in spaceflight
