= Pocket Radar =

Pocket Radar®
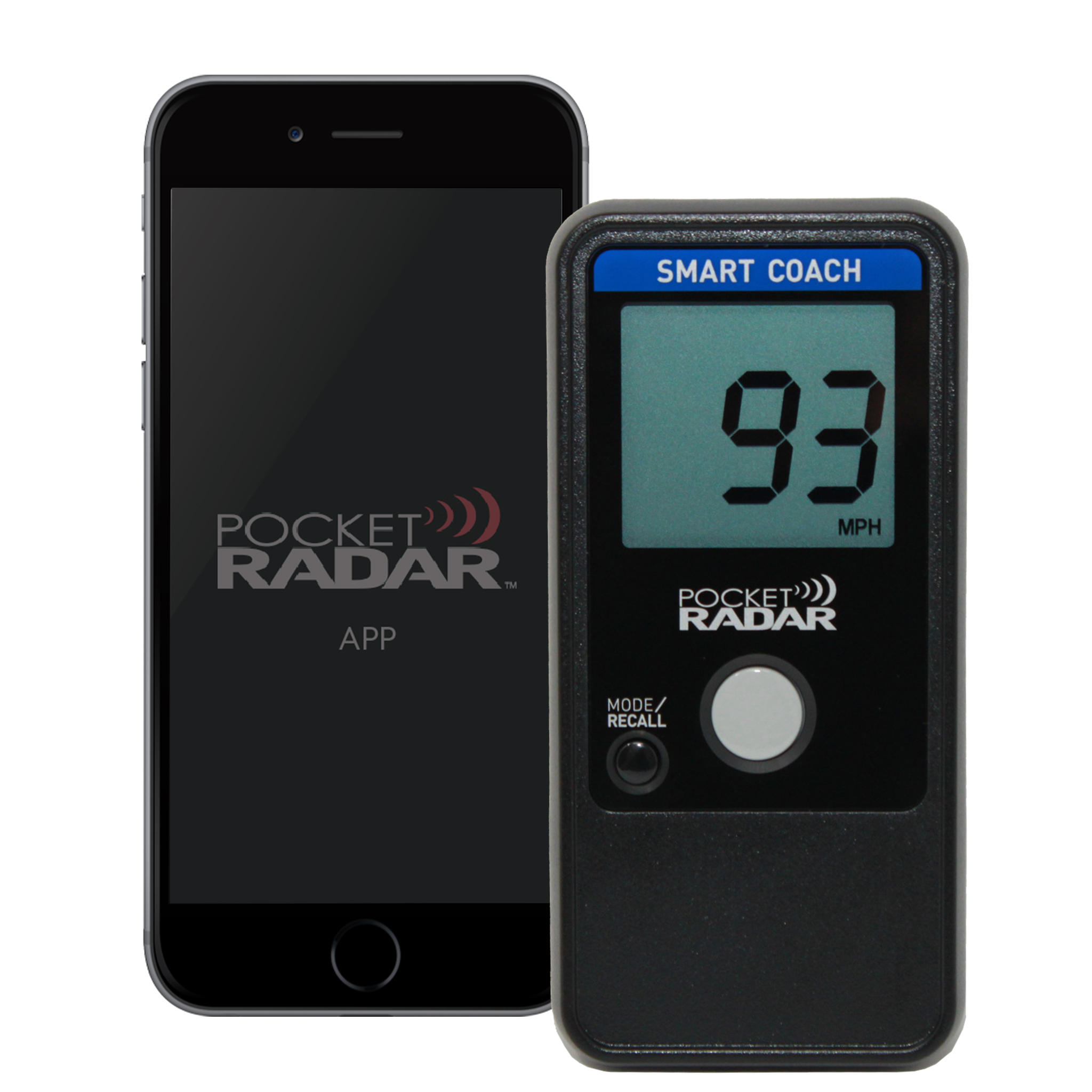
- Type: Smart Coach Radar with Companion App
- Precision: ±1 mph (±1.6 km/h)

Pocket Radar products are handheld K‐band Doppler speed radar guns developed and manufactured by Pocket Radar, Inc, a company based in Santa Rosa, California. It was intended for those wishing to measure the speed of everyday objects (such as cars and people).

== Functionality ==
Pocket Radar utilizes very similar microwave signal emission and detection methods found in the Doppler speed radar guns used by law enforcement agencies. The device measures 4.7 by 2.3 inches (119 by 58 mm) and weighs 4.5 ounces (130 g) when equipped with two AAA batteries. It operates at the 24.125 GHz K-Band frequency and can measure speeds ranging from 7 to 375 mph (11 to 604 km/h) with an accuracy of ±1 mph (±1.6 km/h) and can also measure feet/second and meters/second.

== Pocket Radar, Inc ==
Pocket Radar was developed and manufactured by Pocket Radar, Inc. of Santa Rosa, California. The company’s founders, Chris Stewart, Steve Goody, and Grant Moulton were developers in wireless and communication technology companies Hewlett Packard, Cerent Corporation, Caymas Systems, Next Level Communications, Agilent Technologies, and Cisco Systems, prior to forming Pocket Radar, Inc.

== Awards ==
The Pocket Radar was released at the 2010 Consumer Electronics Show in the personal electronics category where it was received by technology press including CNN, The Los Angeles Times, PC Magazine, Consumer Reports, FOX Business News, ABC News, and others. In 2010, the device was named an Innovations Honoree by the Consumer Electronics Show and received the Popular Mechanic's Editor's Choice Award in 2010.
