= Quill (satellite) =

Experimental United States National Reconnaissance Office program

- Manufacturer: Goodyear; University of Michigan's Willow Run Laboratories; Lockheed (Agena)
- Country of origin: USA
- Operator: US National Reconnaissance Office
- Applications: Radar imaging

Specifications
- Bus: Agena-D
- Launch mass: 1,500 kg
- Regime: Low Earth
- Design life: 4 days

Production
- Status: Out of service
- Built: 3
- Launched: 1
- Retired: 1
- Maiden launch: OPS 3762, 21 December 1964
- Last retirement: OPS 3762, 25 December 1964

Related spacecraft
- Derived from: KH-4

Quill was an experimental United States National Reconnaissance Office (NRO) program of the 1960s, which provided the first images of Earth from space using a synthetic aperture radar (SAR). Radar-imaging spacecraft of this design were not intended to be deployed operationally, since it was known that this system's resolution, inferior to that of concurrent experimental airborne systems, would not serve that purpose. Instead, the program's predominant goal was to show whether the propagation of radar waves through a large volume of the atmosphere and ionosphere would dangerously degrade the performance of the synthetic aperture feature.

A detailed description of the program has been made available on-line by NRO.

== Objectives ==
Initially, the primary benefit seen to be offered by radar imaging was its capability for operating at night and also for imaging through clouds or other atmospheric obstructions which absorbed or scattered waves not only in the visible spectrum but also in the nearby infra-red and ultraviolet. But radar also offered the benefit of a received signal that was already an electrical time-function one, ready for immediate radio re-transmission. So that project became a means for a trial of real-time image-data transmission as well as a trial of orbiting SAR. Since the theory and the state of the art for such transmission were well understood, it was realized that existing means for this part of Quill's mission would be inadequate for showing the level of detail needed to evaluate military threats even if the best imagery proved to be as good as expected. Still, not only were their lessons to be learned from trying, but also any success in such transmission was a hedge against failure to recover the on-board film, a problem that had plagued many of the early photo-intelligence satellites.

== Description ==
Quill satellites were based around the Lockheed RM-81 Agena-D, which also served as the upper stage for orbital insertion. The prime contractor for the orbiting vehicle and its radar payload was Lockheed. To expedite the test, a synthetic-aperture radar designed for airborne use was adapted, by subcontractor Goodyear, to space operation and the long ranges involved, based on criteria developed by the research team at another participating organization whose relationship to Quill has not yet been declassified.

Although only one satellite was needed, a backup model and an engineering model were also produced. Because the first one, OPS 3762, accomplished all of the project's test objectives, only that one was launched. According to an official NRO history, "In the first 20 years of reconnaissance satellite program activity in the United States, Quill was … the only satellite of any nature to proceed from start to finish with a perfect record in launch, orbital operations, readout, and recovery".

To limit the need for strong data-transmission signals from the satellite, ground stations having a very large signal-capture area (antenna area) and subsequent narrow-beam receiving directivity were desired. Available facilities with large-dish antennas capable of rapidly slewing to follow a satellite across the sky existed at New Boston, NH, and at Vandenberg AFB on the California coast. Those locations were also used for up-communication of radar turn-on and turn-off and other payload control commands.

The side-looking antenna required for SAR operation was mounted nearly flush along one side of the Agena's cylindrical body. In orbit, the body was rolled so that the beam was directed at a vertical angle of 55° from horizontal. From orbital altitudes varying around 130 nautical miles (nm), the beam illuminated the Earth's surface along a 10 nm-wide swath generally 160 nm distant and centered about 93 nm to the left of the vehicle's ground track. The 0.006-radian-wide along-track beam illuminated 0.56 along-track nautical miles at a time, continuing to collect returns from each scene point while traveling that far along the Earth's surface, that much data per scene element to be collapsed ("focused"), during later signal processing, into a single measure ("image") of the strength of return from that scene element.

== Launch ==
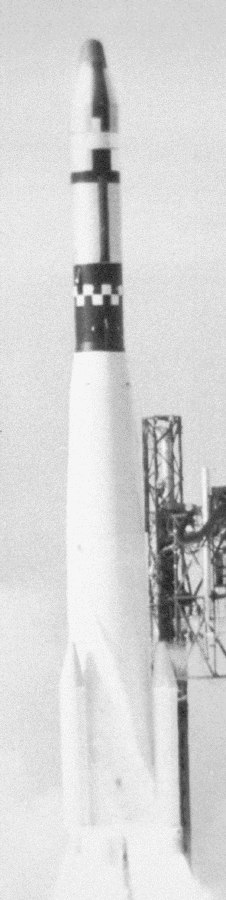
Launch of Thor SLV-2A Agena D with QUILL (Ferret 11) satellite

After launch on 21 December 1964, data collection was commanded intermittently during both day and night for four days by ground controller's commands via the tracking stations. The Quill SAR's operation was therefore restricted to vehicle locations within the about 900-statute-mile (1490 km) maximum line-of-sight distances from those two ground stations. Such regions were almost totally within the U.S., but could cover some of Canada from the eastern station and some of Mexico from the western one. Operating times were further restricted, by the controllers, to areas within NORAD (North American Air Defence) territory, avoiding illuminating or imaging any Mexican territory, but that was not done in regard to Canada, the U.S.'s partner in NORAD.

To avoid calling excessive attention to this unique vehicle, its orbital path was similar to one then being used by U. S. photo satellites. Since launch from Vandenberg AFB near midday meant that the initial orbit began as a descending (southbound) leg during daylight, all later descending legs did likewise and all ascending (northbound) legs occurred during darkness. At U.S. imaging latitudes, those ascending legs proceeded along paths at azimuths between 018° T and 022° T, more northerly than north-northeasterly, becoming slightly more easterly within that region as each path went to higher north or south latitudes. The azimuths of the descending (southbound) legs during imaging times were similar between 162° T and 158° T. Unlike its downward-looking photo-satellite cousins, Quill looked northeasterly during descending legs and northwesterly during ascending ones.

== Flight path ==
Quill's first descending path crossed South America and reached its farthest south near Antarctica below the middle of the South Atlantic. The following ascent skirted Africa's east coast, then crossed Pakistan and the western tip of China near Alma Ata in the Soviet Union. Subsequent ascents followed paths of similar shape, but each one was “set over” to the west from the previous one by the amount of Earth rotation in one orbital period plus a small amount of westerly orbit precession, for a total of 22.5°. Thus the second non-imaging ascent passed over the Caspian Sea, the third over western Turkey, the fourth near northern Italy's border with France, and the fifth over Ireland. The seventh ascent, the first one west of the Atlantic, went over Nova Scotia and Newfoundland, and the eighth was the first to reach the U.S. Midwestern states, where the initial imaging event took place.

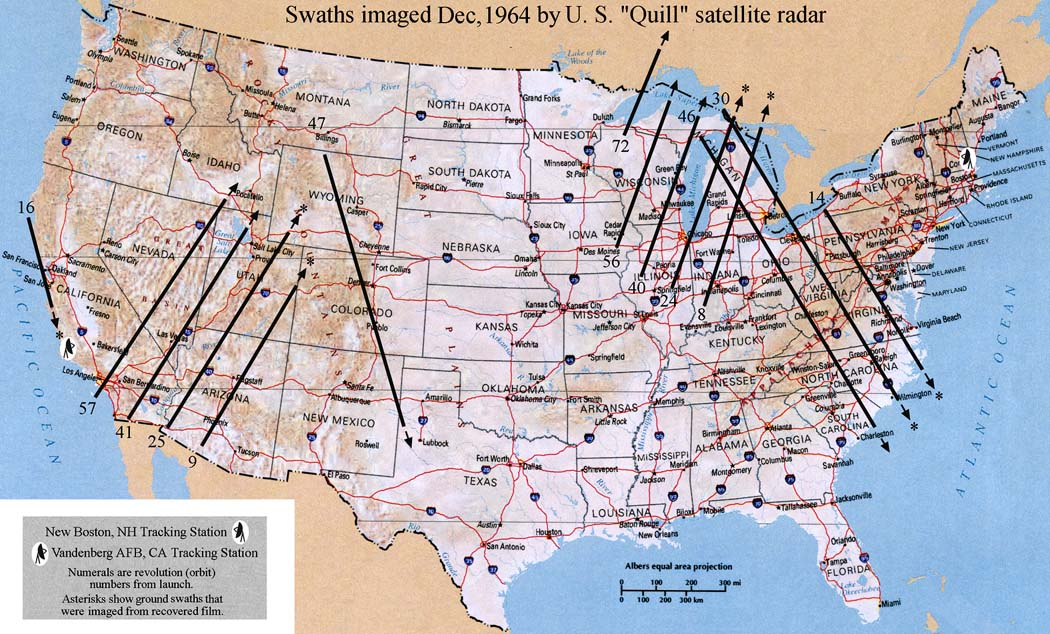
The swaths imaged December 1964 by U. S. "Quill" satellite radar.

Sets of descending (southbound) paths at U.S. imaging latitudes occurred first over Pacific Ocean areas west of California and first occurred over eastern parts of the U.S. nearly a day later. After a substantial interval, a new set of northbound and then one of the southbound paths over the U.S. occurred, there being four such sets in four successive days, two of them then crossing previous ascending paths. The last onboard recording of data on film occurred during the descending leg of the 30th revolution. That film was ejected and recovered over the Pacific Ocean during the descending portion of the 33rd orbit, after which only down-linked data were available. The final ground swath was imaged in the 72nd orbit, during which imaging ceased because the chemical battery providing system power became too discharged for continued payload operation.

The longest (orbit 30) image swath stretched about 1000 miles (1600 km), a length limited by the maximum distance at which the satellite remained above the tracking station's horizon. The capture of data for that swath occupied only 3.6 minutes of orbit time.

== Data processing ==
Three methods of image data recording were used. The highest-quality data was displayed on an on-board cathode ray tube and recorded on photographic film. Recovery of the on-board film was by the method used for the then-current U. S. photo satellites, which was to eject a re-entry package containing the exposed film and capture the package in mid-air as it descended under a parachute. Since that process did not take place until after Quill's first seven imaging sequences, images from down-linked data were both the first and the last to be available. Down-linked data was ground-recorded in real-time on similar films and also on magnetic tapes. The early availability of those films allowed image interpreters to observe the boundaries and contents of early image swaths before the on-board film was released from the satellite, a capability not then possible with optical film-camera sensors.

Data returned by down-link was of reduced quality due to the characteristics of the down-link, so that signal films exposed on the ground from that data had to be of lower quality than that simultaneously exposed on board. Signal films made later from magnetic tape recordings of the down-linked signals suffered somewhat more.

Signal film from all of the three recording sources was developed at a ground processing facility. At that point, the optical appearance of the SAR data on the film in no way resembled an image of the terrain illuminated by the radar. Instead, it appeared visually nearly like noise, except that it was striated lengthwise of the film. Each striation represented a different radar range and contained long sequences of overlapping radar-return signals from many (literally thousands) of terrain points at that range. Further data- processing was needed to separate those signals from each other and to create, from each of the many distributed signal contributions, one spot of the proper intensity at each image point corresponding to a terrain point. At that time, the only technique available for the job was a high-quality optical data-processor (the Precision Optical Processor, or POP) that had been developed specifically for both airborne and orbiting SAR systems.

That data-processor converted the information on the signal film by passing laser light thru each long signal, after which the form of the signal itself, aided by specialized following lenses, caused a focusing action similar to that of one of a range-distributed family of cylindrical lenses, while preserving the point separations representing ranges from the radar. The immediate result was another exposed film, this one becoming, when developed, a negative of the desired image. Measurements of the signal bandwidth, signal-to-noise ratio, the sharpness of focus, etc., were made with instrumentation that dealt directly with the image-forming illumination in the processor, avoiding the non-linearity of the response characteristics of the image film. Final films containing positive images for use by image interpreters were made from the negative-image films.

The first signal film to be processed was that ground-recorded in real-time from data down-linked during the first imaging pass, made during the eighth revolution. Therefore, a preliminary evaluation of the first image film was available before much other imaging passes occurred. It showed that that first image swath began in southern Indiana and continued north-northeasterly over Michigan's the lower peninsula. Comparisons of its image with 1:250,000 USGS maps showed the location of that swath very clearly, based particularly on the positively recognizable form of distinctive windings of the Wabash River in Indiana and on the forms of nearby highways and railroads and some urban areas. This first availability of early image-content information provided an example of using feedback from the system's early image product to help control the orbiting system's later imaging passes and to allow ground crews to position calibration objects within coming swaths in time for later imaging. An unexpected bonus from the first image was the determination of the locations, lengths, and makeups of some railroad trains, plus their speeds and directions of travel.

A tracking antenna and recording equipment devised for the purpose had been pre-located near enough to the expected initial imaging path so that the form of the radar pulses (very much stronger than the radar returns to the satellite) was monitored during that pass. After the orbital path had been accurately determined by observation of early images, portable equipment was rapidly shuttled to various locations within coming image swaths for similar measurements.

Processed-image measurements showed that the synthetic aperture succeeded in producing resolution finer than 15 feet (5 meters) in the along-track direction, and occasionally half of that, the least possible with Quill's 5-meter-long side-looking real antenna. The slant-range resolution was limited by the length of the transmitted pulses, and the ground-range resolution was further limited by the image foreshortening due to the obliquity of the images, the latter being about 5 times coarser than the along-track value, but values of those were not ones sought by this experiment.

Surface features relatable to map features occurred so frequently in the images that the edges of all image swaths could be traced nearly continuously on the maps. Besides boldly map-identified large features such as urban development, highway patterns, canals, bridges, and airports, the images showed other viewer-identifiable cultural and natural mapped and unmapped items such as agricultural field patterns, drainage patterns, forested versus open areas (usually revealed by bright returns from near-range sides of wooded areas and shadows along their far-range sides), qualitative relief patterns (revealed by variations of slope tones), large surface-mining operations, and well-defined shorelines bordering no-return areas representing smooth water surfaces. In high-relief (mountain) areas, the obliquity effects produced irregular swath-edge lines on maps and similar "layover" of images of elevated surface features onto nearer-range and lower-elevation "map" locations.

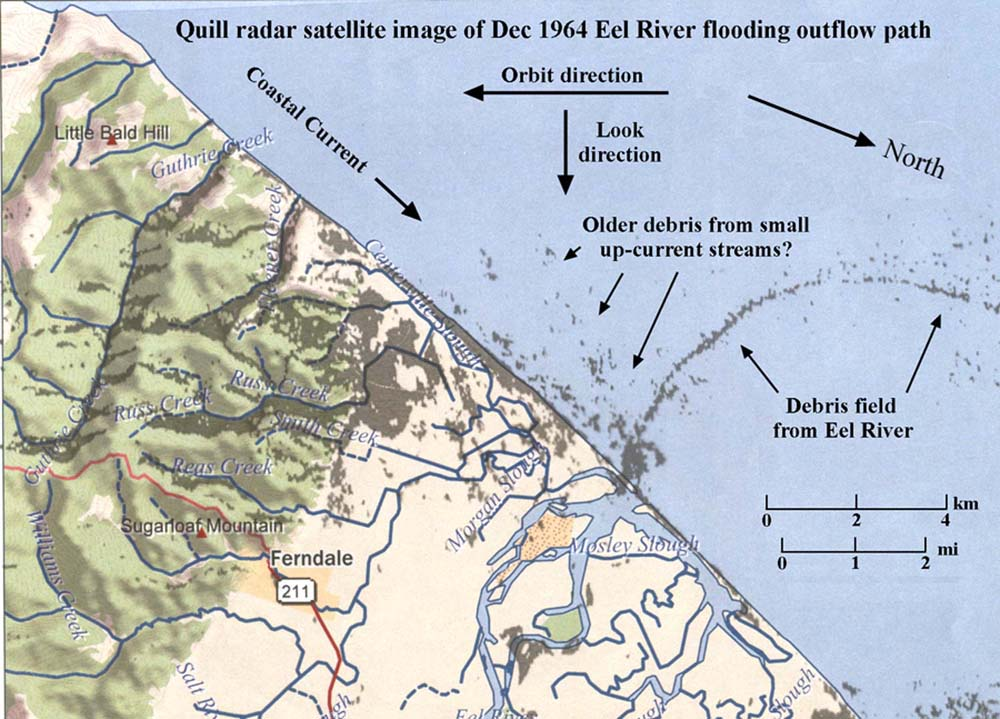
The colored content is USGS-derived base map. The gray overlay is derived from a "Quill" satellite radar image made during the December 1964 flooding of California's Eel River.

Some results of the experiment provided vivid demonstrations that images having Quill's detail (and even considerably coarser detail, such as that of the 14-years-later civilian SEASAT spacecraft) would indeed be useful for wide-area environmental monitoring and research studies of the earth and other planets. One especially notable such image showed, in spite of intervening dense cloud cover and very heavy rainfall, a clear depiction of not only the extent of flooding of a Pacific coastal area, but also the extent of the debris-laden invasion of a river's flood current several miles into the ocean, an information-gathering capability not otherwise available. Another pair of images, one from ascending orbit 24 and the other from descending orbit 30, showed changes in both the locations and rotations of movable Great Lakes ice during the 9½-hour interval between the two imagings.

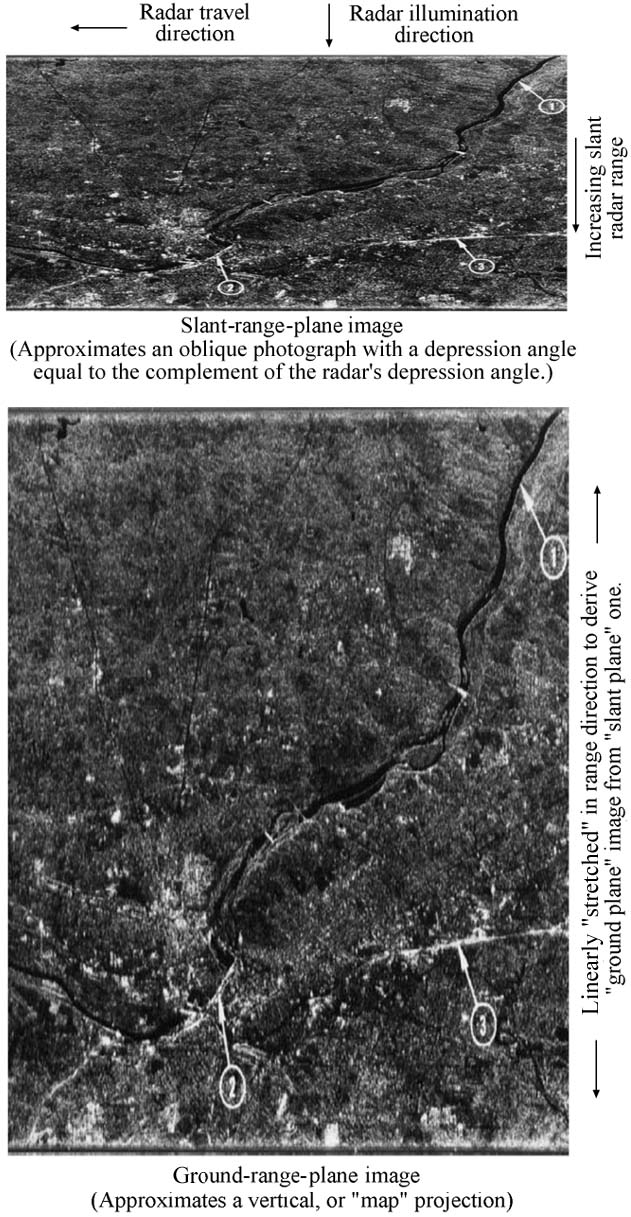
One of the few still-available images made by the Quill satellite radar covered part of Richmond, Virginia.

To preserve return-signal strength, Quill's range from its target areas had been minimized by using an unusually steep depression angle. The resulting images, therefore, had slant-range scales that were much foreshortened versions of the ground-range (mapping) scale of level terrain. While slant-range images provide a realistic perspective of terrain elevation variations, users of imagery usually prefer map-like images having nearly matching scales in both ground-range and along-track directions. Because the optical processor of that time did not have the capability to make full expansions to the ground-range scale, only partially expanded images were made during the processing of the original images.

== Data wasted due to secrecy ==
The fact of combining SAR and an orbiting platform required giving the program both a very high-level security classification and very restricted access. That led to the later destruction of nearly all documentation before the program was declassified on 9 July 2012. Consequently, the surviving documentation is mostly limited to microfilm copies of the final reports, in which text material is well preserved but copies of images contain almost no intermediate tones and are therefore incomprehensible. A semi-exception is the above-mentioned orbit-16 image of a flood-driven debris field extending several miles out to sea. Although the surviving image is only a nearly two-toned feature, it does show the geometric form of that feature and its relation to nearby terrain features.

Other exceptions are preserved photo prints of selected parts of three image strips. Digitally scanned copies of those prints are available in an NRO history document that is available on-line. However, those prints were at a scale that did not preserve either the fine along-track resolution or the coherence speckle effect that is observed in SAR images, both of which features were observable on the image films. In the absence of those films, all examples of Quill images having that resolution have been irretrievably lost.

== See also ==
- 1964 in spaceflight
- History of synthetic-aperture radar
- Lacrosse (satellite)
