= 19th-Century American Sheet Music at UNC Chapel Hill Music Library =

The University of North Carolina at Chapel Hill Music Library contains a collection of approximately 3,500 19th century vocal and instrumental titles of American popular music. The collection has been digitally scanned and tagged for simple browsing.
