= ECHO Clearinghouse =

NASA system

The Earth Observing System (EOS) Clearinghouse, or ECHO refers to a system that was used by the National Aeronautics and Space Administration (NASA) to spatially, temporally and otherwise index the petabytes of data that NASA's Earth Science projects collect. It does not hold the data itself, but serves as a search engine that other applications can access via a web service based interface. While ECHO has been set up to support both data and services, as of mid-2008, data is well represented and services are yet to be focused on.

== History ==
In the late 1990s, NASA recognized that the emerging internet technologies would facilitate a democratization of the access to data. NASA began the ECHO effort as a prototype, using web technology to allow the public extensive access to data previously only available to researchers. Access was initially through an application programming interface, not a graphical user interface.

== Retirement ==
In 2017, the Common Metadata Repository (CMR) replaced ECHO as a high-performance, high-quality, continuously evolving metadata system that catalogs all data and service metadata records for NASA's EOSDIS. CMR will be the authoritative management system for all EOSDIS metadata.
