= Oak Ridge National Laboratory Distributed Active Archive Center =

NASA data center

The ORNL DAAC (Oak Ridge National Laboratory Distributed Active Archive Center) for Biogeochemical Dynamics is a National Aeronautics and Space Administration (NASA) Earth Observing System Data and Information System (EOSDIS) data center managed by the Earth Science Data and Information System (ESDIS) Project. Established in 1993, the ORNL DAAC is operated by Oak Ridge National Laboratory in Oak Ridge, Tennessee, under an interagency agreement between NASA and the Department of Energy (DOE). Within the ORNL, the ORNL DAAC is part of the Remote Sensing and Environmental Informatics Group of the Environmental Sciences Division (ESD).

EOSDIS data centers process, archive, and distribute data collected during Earth Observing System (EOS) satellite and field missions. They also develop tools for accessing data, provide user services, promote data usage, and collect metrics on the use of data and user satisfaction. The ORNL DAAC specializes on data and information relevant to terrestrial biogeochemistry, ecology, and environmental processes, which are critical to understanding the dynamics of Earth's biological, geological, and chemical components.

As provided on the website,

The mission of the ORNL DAAC is to assemble, distribute, and provide data services for a comprehensive archive of terrestrial biogeochemistry and ecological dynamics observations and models to facilitate research, education, and decision-making in support of NASA's Earth Science.

The ORNL DAAC is listed in the Registry of Research Data Repositories and is a Regular Member of the ISC World Data System.

== See also ==
- Distributed Active Archive Center
- Earth Observing System
- Oak Ridge National Laboratory
