= Brahms-Institut =

Private library in Lübeck, Germany

Coordinates: 53.880°N 10.696°E

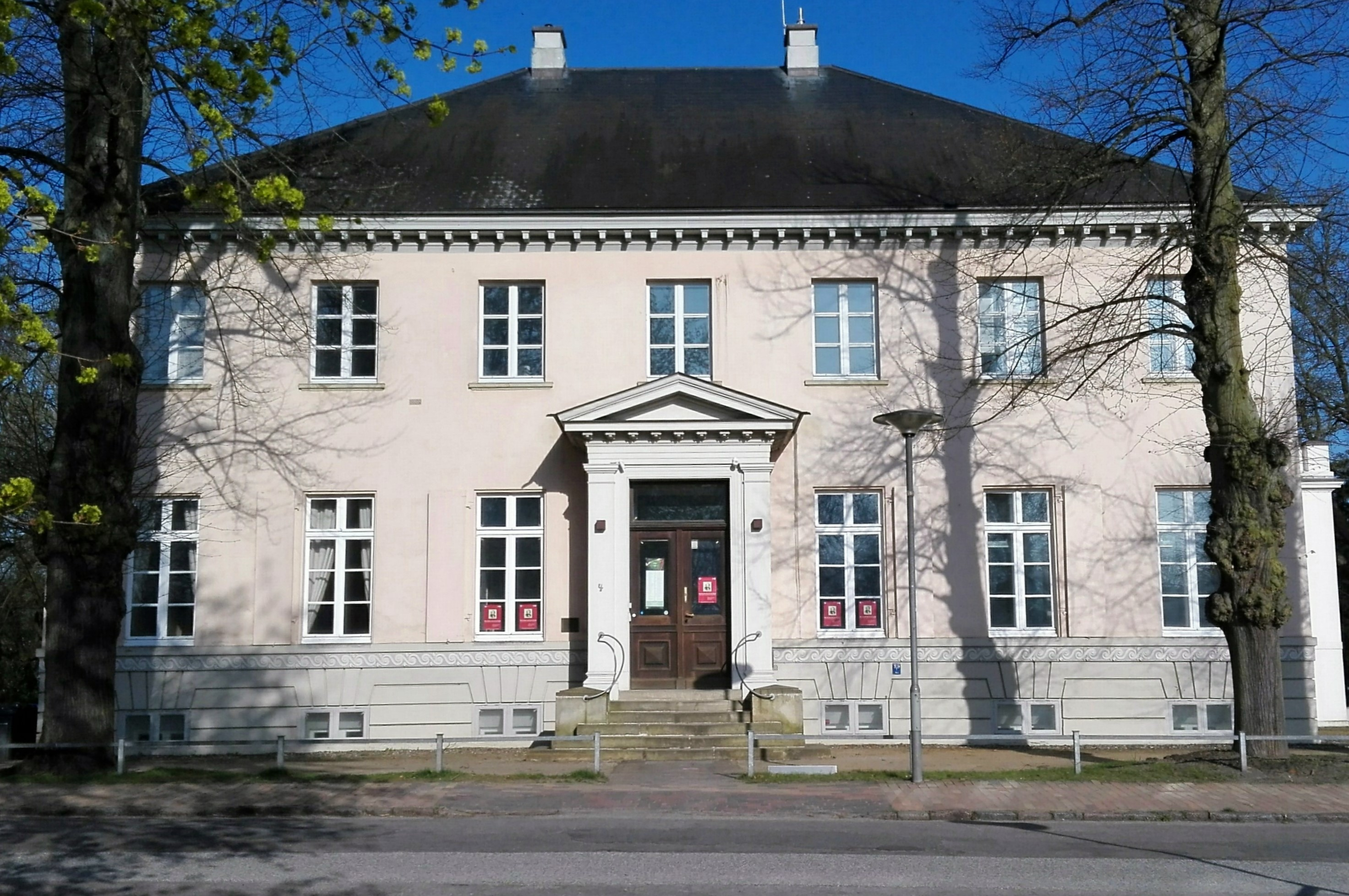
Brahms-Institut in the Villa Eschenburg in Lübeck

Brahms-Institut acquired the largest private collection of Johannes Brahms engravings, manuscripts and first and early prints in 1990. In addition to Brahms, the focus is on Robert and Clara Schumann, Theodor Kirchner, Joseph Joachim, and some lesser known performers and composers of the era. In addition to music manuscripts, the collection also includes correspondence, photos, and drawings.

== See also ==
- List of music museums
