= Frances G. Spencer Collection of American Sheet Music =

The Frances G. Spencer Collection of American Sheet Music is a collection of over 30,000 titles of American popular music spanning from the late 18th century to the early 20th century. It includes many first editions such as Jingle Bells and Battle Hymn of the Republic, as well as first editions of prominent American composers of the time such as Stephen Foster and Scott Joplin. The collection was acquired by Baylor University in 1965. In 2000, an effort began to digitize the entire collection with a TexTreasures grant which funded the imaging and cataloging of the collection.

The Frances G. Spencer Collection of American Sheet Music is one of the few collections of its kind and size in the country. This collection was the life-long pursuit of the avid and well-respected sheet music collector for whom the collection is named. The Spencer collection complements a number of areas of study in addition to music, including Texas and American history, art, political science, sociology, theater, sports, and recreation. It is arranged in over 200 subject categories.

The lyrics and cover art of this collection provide a fascinating window to a wide variety of topics of historical and cultural interest including Texas and American history, art, political science, sociology, theater, sports, and recreation. Access to such an important collection affords researchers and students of all ages an exciting resource for better understanding of our shared history.

This project greatly facilitates the use of the collection by a larger and more varied audience. No longer is it available only to scholars and students within the immediate area; it is accessible throughout the state and beyond by individuals and classrooms connected to the Internet. In addition, the electronic format provides virtually unlimited access while reducing physical damage to the fragile original materials.
