= Carl A. Wiley =

Inventor of Synthetic-aperture Radar

- Born: December 30, 1918; Princeton, New Jersey
- Died: April 21, 1985 (aged 66); Westchester, Los Angeles
- Education: B.S. Mathematics from Antioch College in 1944: M.A. from Ohio State University in 1949
- Spouse: Jean

Carl Atwood Wiley (December 30, 1918 – April 21, 1985) was an American mathematician and engineer. He is most widely known as the originator of the solar sail concept as well as the inventor of synthetic aperture radar.

== Career ==
Wiley's research work began at the Air Force Aircraft Radiation Lab at Wright Field in 1941. In 1942 he discovered the piezoelectricity of Barium titanate, for which he later was awarded a patent. In 1949 he went to work as the engineer-in-charge of Goodyear Aerophysics. It was during this time he invented synthetic aperture radar in 1951, patented as "Pulsed Doppler Radar Methods and Means," #3,196,436. That same year Wiley posited the idea of solar sails in a science fiction story published in Astounding Science Fiction magazine entitled Clipper Ships of Space (originally titled Are the Clipper Ships gone forever?). Wiley wrote his story under the pen name of Russel Saunders, an in-group reference to Russel–Saunders coupling not unlike J.J. Coupling, itself a reference to angular momentum. Seven years later Richard L. Garwin developed the first technical specifications for a solar sail. Robert L. Forward credited Wiley for the genesis of the idea in Forward's 1990 patent. Wiley's research and manuscripts for the story are now housed in the Eaton collection. In 1953 he left Goodyear to found his own company, Wiley Electronics in Phoenix, Arizona until it was bought out in 1962. Following that Wiley worked for North American Aviation and its successor, Rockwell International where he worked on various radar projects including LOCO, SINCO, VOLPHASE, and VOLFRE. In 1978 he went to work at Hughes Aircraft Company where he eventually retired as a chief scientist in the technology division of Hughes' Space and Communications Group. In 1985, IEEE awarded Wiley their Pioneer Award.

== See also ==
- History of synthetic-aperture radar
