= Seasat =

American ocean observation satellite (1978)

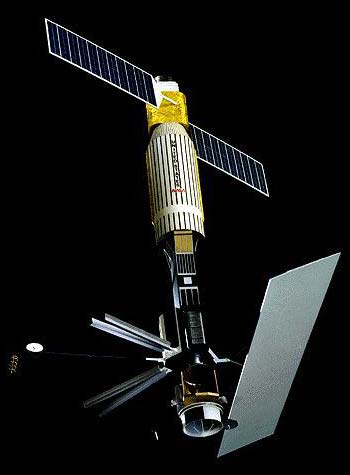
- Seasat
- Mission type: Oceanography
- Operator: NASA / JPL / Caltech
- COSPAR ID: 1978-064A
- SATCAT no.: 10967
- Mission duration: Operational: 3 months and 13 days

Spacecraft properties
- Bus: Agena-D
- Manufacturer: Lockheed; Ball Aerospace; JPL
- Launch mass: 2,290 kg (5,050 lb)
- Power: 700 watts

Start of mission
- Launch date: 27 June 1978, 01:12 UTC
- Rocket: Atlas E/F Agena-D
- Launch site: Vandenberg SLC-3W

End of mission
- Last contact: 10 October 1978 UTC

Orbital parameters
- Reference system: Geocentric
- Regime: Sun-synchronous
- Eccentricity: 0.00209
- Perigee altitude: 769 kilometers (478 mi)
- Apogee altitude: 799 kilometers (496 mi)
- Inclination: 108.0 degrees
- Period: 100.7 minutes
- Epoch: 26 June 1978, 21:12:00 UTC

Instruments
Instruments
- ALT: Radar Altimeter
- LRR: Laser Retro-Reflector
- SAR: Synthetic Aperture Radar
- SASS: SeaSat-A Scatterometer System
- SMMR: Scanning Multichannel Microwave Radiometer
- VIRR: Visible and Infrared Radiometer

Seasat was the first Earth-orbiting satellite designed for remote sensing of the Earth's oceans and had on board one of the first spaceborne synthetic-aperture radar (SAR). The mission was designed to demonstrate the feasibility of global satellite monitoring of oceanographic phenomena and to help determine the requirements for an operational ocean remote sensing satellite system. Specific objectives were to collect data on sea-surface winds, sea-surface temperatures, wave heights, internal waves, atmospheric water, sea ice features and ocean topography. Seasat was managed by NASA's Jet Propulsion Laboratory and was launched on 27 June 1978 into a nearly circular 800 km (500 mi) orbit with an inclination of 108°. Seasat operated until 10 October 1978 (UTC), when a massive short circuit in the Agena-D bus electrical system ended the mission.

== Instruments ==
Seasat carried five major instruments designed to return the maximum information from ocean surfaces:

1. Radar altimeter to measure spacecraft height above the ocean surface
2. Microwave scatterometer to measure wind speed and direction
3. Scanning multichannel microwave radiometer to measure sea surface temperature
4. Visible and infrared radiometer to identify cloud, land and water features
5. Synthetic aperture radar (SAR) L-band, HH polarization, fixed look angle to monitor the global surface wave field and polar sea ice conditions {the antenna is the light parallelogram in the picture}. The SAR support structure was designed and manufactured by Northrop Grumman Astro Aerospace in Carpinteria, California. The structure deployed on orbit.

Many later remote sensing missions benefited from Seasat's legacy. These include imaging radars flown on NASA's Space Shuttle, altimeters on Earth-orbiting satellites such as TOPEX/Poseidon, and scatterometers on ADEOS I, QuikSCAT, and Jason-1.

== 2013 data release ==
On the 35th anniversary of Seasat's launch, the Alaska Satellite Facility released newly digitized Seasat synthetic aperture radar (SAR) imagery. Until this release, Seasat SAR data were archived on magnetic tapes, and images processed from the tapes were available only as optical images of film strips or scanned digital images. Neither the tapes nor the film allow the quantitative analysis possible with the new digital archive.

== Conspiracy theory ==
Seasat is claimed to have been able to detect the wakes of submerged submarines. This supposed capability was unexpected. The conspiracy theory holds that when this capability was discovered, the mission was ended for national security reasons, and the end of the mission was falsely blamed on catastrophic failure of the satellite's electric power system. Subsequent ocean-observing SAR satellites with higher resolutions and sensitivities have not exhibited this claimed capability.

== See also ==
- Gladys West, project manager for Seasat
- Quill (satellite), first spaceborne SAR
