= Alaska Satellite Facility =

Data facility and ground station at University of Alaska Fairbanks

The Alaska Satellite Facility (ASF) is a data processing facility and satellite-tracking ground station within the Geophysical Institute at the University of Alaska Fairbanks. The facility's mission is to make remote-sensing data accessible Its work is central to polar processes research including wetlands, glaciers, sea ice, climate change, permafrost, flooding and land cover such as changes in the Amazon rainforest.

== History ==
The Alaska Satellite Facility began as a single-purpose receiving station known as the Alaska Synthetic Aperture Radar (SAR) Facility located in the Geophysical Institute (GI) at the University of Alaska Fairbanks. The interest in space-borne SAR observations began in the U.S. with the success of the Seasat mission in 1978. (There is information below under "Data Center" about the facility's 2013 release of newly processed Seasat SAR data.) After Seasat's premature demise, scientists from the federally funded Jet Propulsion Laboratory and the Geophysical Institute developed the concept of a ground station in Fairbanks, Alaska, to receive data from foreign satellites.

In 1986, the Jet Propulsion Laboratory requested and approved a quotation for the integration of a receiving ground station, the Alaska SAR Facility, at UAF. The Alaska SAR Facility was marked at a ribbon-cutting ceremony on April 24, 1991. Later that year, the facility began down-linking European Remote Sensing Satellite-1 (ERS-1) data. The expected data volume for the station was 45 minutes total from ERS-1, JERS-1 and RADARSAT. In the operations stage, data flow rapidly increased due to changing requirements from flight agencies and government sponsors, and storage of online data and demand for SAR data was expected to rapidly exceed capacity. The Satellite-Tracking Ground Station launched in 1990, and in 1994 a Memorandum of Agreement (MOA) between NASA and UAF formed the ASF Distributed Active Archive Center (DAAC). The facility was renamed the Alaska Satellite Facility in 2003.

The ASF DAAC is one of 12 DAACs funded by NASA to support earth observations from ground-based, in-situ, airborne, and space borne sensors. The ASF DAAC processes, distributes, and archives data products as assigned by NASA. The ASF DAAC archive now offers more than a dozen synthetic aperture radar (SAR) datasets. Tasking and missions have been added or deleted from the MOA when deemed appropriate by NASA program managers, Goddard Space Flight Center (GSFC) personnel, and ASF management.

NASA, on behalf of the Canadian Space Agency, launched RADARSAT-1 in November 1995. At this point, ASF was handling data from the original three satellite missions that spurred the science community into envisioning this facility. The launch of ADEOS-1 resulted in ASF simultaneously supporting four active missions until the loss of the two Japanese missions (ADEOS-1 in 1996 and JERS-1 in 1998), and the deactivation of ERS-1 with the launch of ERS-2 in 1996. In November 2002, the National Oceanic and Atmospheric Administration (NOAA) appointed UAF as agent for the data acquisition, processing, and distribution to support the Japanese Advanced Land Observing Satellite (ALOS) mission, which featured Phased Array L-band Synthetic Aperture Radar (PALSAR). With the successful launch of ALOS in January 2006, ASF's Americas ALOS Data Node (AADN) became operational in October that same year when the Japan Aerospace Exploration Agency (JAXA) declared the ALOS mission operational. The satellite functioned for five years.

== Data center ==
The ASF DAAC provides production, archiving and distribution to the scientific community of synthetic aperture radar (SAR) data products and tools from active and past missions. The facility is one of 12 theme-based National Aeronautics and Space Administration (NASA) earth science data centers in the nation known as NASA Distributed Active Archive Centers (DAACs). The DAACs are major components of the Earth Observing System Data and Information System (EOSDIS), which in turn is part of NASA's Earth Science Data Systems Program.

The Alaska Satellite Facility is the only DAAC that focuses on SAR. It is also the U.S. archive for Sentinel-1A and Sentinel-1B (a European Space Agency mission), European Remote Sensing Satellite 1 and 2 (ERS 1/ERS 2), the Japanese Earth Resources Satellite 1 (JERS 1), RADARSAT 1 and the Japanese Advanced Land Observing Satellite (ALOS) mission, which featured Phased Array L-band Synthetic Aperture Radar (PALSAR). Due to the agreements with many of the foreign agencies involved, at first much of the foreign-source DAAC data was restricted distribution to NASA-approved scientists only. But in 2015, the ALOS PALSAR data became unrestricted, and the Sentinel-1 data is also unrestricted.

In June 2013, the Alaska Satellite Facility released newly processed, 35-year-old data from the 1978 Seasat satellite mission. Before this release, only 20 percent of the Seasat SAR data had been processed digitally.

== Satellite-tracking ground station ==
As a receiving station for satellite data, the facility now operates three antennas on behalf of NASA: two 11-meter S/X band antennas and one 9-meter S/X-band. The second antenna was installed in 1994, in anticipation of the launch of the Advanced Earth Observing Satellite-1 (ADEOS-1) by Japan. The second 11-meter antenna was installed in 1995 on University-owned land within walking distance from the Geophysical Institute, and the 9-meter antenna replaced the original ground-station antenna in 2017. The ground station's prime polar location in Fairbanks enables the facility to service high-inclination, polar-orbiting, Earth-imaging spacecraft. The systems operate 24 hours a day, 7 days per week. The facility has evolved over the past 20 years into a full-service station, providing telemetry downlink, uplink, command and two-way coherent tracking services as one of 15 major members of the international Near Earth Network, which is managed by NASA's Goddard Space Flight Center. The facility processes, and distributes raw data from remote-sensing satellites, servicing NASA and foreign agency satellites in support of scientific and operational research and applications.

== GeoData center ==
The Alaska Satellite Facility managed the Geophysical Institute's GeoData Center for many years. In 2016, management of the center was transferred out of the Alaska Satellite Facility. Its new website is here.
