= Ignaz Pleyel Early Editions =

Ignaz Pleyel Early Editions is a digital collection of musical scores by Ignaz Pleyel that is managed by the University of Iowa as a part of the Rita Benton Music Library. The collection consists of keyboard and chamber music, as well as, arrangements of large orchestral works. The physical collection was assembled by Dr. Rita Benton who was a noted Pleyel scholar and served as head of the Music Library at the University of Iowa.
