= Digital Image Archive of Medieval Music =

Online database of early music

- Developer(s): University of Oxford
- Initial release: 1998; 27 years ago
- Type: Multi-model database
- Website: www.diamm.ac.uk

The Digital Image Archive of Medieval Music (DIAMM) is an online database of all European polyphonic music sources before 1550. Founded in 1998, it is based in Oxford and maintained by the University of Oxford's Music Faculty and the Bodleian Library.

== Overview ==
It is the only complete listing of all medieval and early modern manuscripts of European polyphonic music. It is founded on a digital archive of images of European medieval and early to high-Renaissance polyphonic music ranging from complete manuscripts to fragments. The collection, created by the University of Oxford and Royal Holloway University of London, includes metadata for all manuscripts from 800 to 1550 A.D., and most of those from 1550 to 1650, with images for about 20% of the sources. The image collection is added to on a regular basis thanks to donations from libraries and collaborations with projects who acquire images and are able to donate them to DIAMM for display.

The project has recently benefited from collaborations with two AHRC-funded projects: Sources of British Song (contributing images of manuscripts of monophonic song c. 1150-1300. The project uses sub-pages on DIAMM for its website) and Tudor Partbooks (contributing images of all Tudor partbooks dating from c. 1500 to c. 1630).

DIAMM relies primarily on grant funding and donations from users for its maintenance. The project is currently not funded, and is maintained on a voluntary basis. It has recently founded DIAMM Publications, which produces high-quality colour facsimiles of manuscripts in the image collection accompanied by academic introductory studies by leaders in their fields, without the considerable markup of conventional publishers. The income from publications is largely put back into other publications, but is also available to support the online resource when funds are urgently required.

== Publications ==
- Magnus Williamson. The Eton Choirbook. Full colour facsimile with introductory study (Oxford: DIAMM Publications, 2010). ISBN 978-1-907647-00-0
- John Milsom. The Dow Partbooks. Full colour facsimile with introductory study 6 vols (Oxford: DIAMM Publications, 2010). ISBN 978-1-907647-02-4
- Kerry McCarthy. William Byrd, Masses for 3, 4 and 5 voices. Full colour facsimile with introductory study 5 vols paperback (Oxford: DIAMM Publications, 2013). ISBN 978-1-907647-05-5
- David Fallows. The Henry Book. Full colour facsimile with introductory study (Oxford: DIAMM Publications, 2014). ISBN 978-1-907647-04-8
- Earp, Lawrence, Leo, Domenic, Shapreau, Carla. The Ferrell-Vogüé Machaut Manuscript. Full colour facsimile with introductory study 2 vols (Oxford: DIAMM Publications, 2014). ISBN 978-1-907647-05-5
