= Meteosat =

Series of european weather satellites

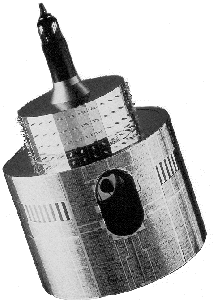
Meteosat First Generation satellite

The Meteosat series of satellites are geostationary meteorological satellites operated by EUMETSAT under the Meteosat Transition Programme (MTP) and the Meteosat Second Generation (MSG) program.

The MTP program was established to ensure the operational continuity between the end of the successful Meteosat Operational Programme in 1995 and Meteosat Second Generation (MSG), which came into operation at the start of 2004 using improved satellites. The MSG program provided the prime operational services from 2003 until the MTG (Meteosat Third Generation) program began to gradually replace them.

The first MTG operational imager satellite, MTG-I1, launched in December 2022 and became operational in 2025, assuming the prime satellite role for the 0-degree longitude Full Disk scanning service (FDSS) mission. This was joined by the first operational sounder satellite, MTG-S1 when it launched in July 2025, with a second imager satellite, MTG-I2, planned for launch in the second half of 2026.

== First Generation ==
Satellites in the first generation Meteosat series
| Satellite | Launch date | Launch Vehicle | Launch site | Mission end |
|---|---|---|---|---|
| Meteosat-1 | 23 November 1977 | Delta 2914 | Cape Canaveral, LC-17A | Imager failed in November 1979; data collection ended in 1984 |
| Meteosat-2 | 10 June 1981 | Ariane 1 | Kourou, ELA-1 | Moved to graveyard orbit in December 1991 |
| Meteosat-3 (Meteosat-P2) | 15 June 1988 | Ariane-44LP H10 | Kourou, ELA-2 | Retired in 1995 |
| Meteosat-4 (MOP-1) | 19 April 1989 | Ariane-44LP H10 | Kourou, ELA-2 | Deactivated in November 1996. |
| Meteosat-5 (MOP-2) | 02 March 1991 | Ariane-44LP H10 | Kourou, ELA-2 | Decommissioned and placed into graveyard orbit in February 2007 |
| Meteosat-6 (MOP-3) | 20 November 1993 | Ariane-44LP H10 | Kourou, ELA-2 | Continued data transmission service until late 2010 or in early 2011 |
| Meteosat-7 (MTP/MOP-3) | 03 September 1997 | Ariane-44LP H10-3 | Kourou, ELA-2 | Placed into graveyard orbit in April 2017 |

The first generation of Meteosat satellites, Meteosat-1 to Meteosat-7, provided continuous and reliable meteorological observations from space to a large user community. All Meteosat satellites from Meteosat-1 to Meteosat-7 have now been retired.

When operational, the Meteosat First Generation provided images every half-hour in three spectral channels (Visible, Infrared) and Water Vapour, via the Meteosat Visible and Infrared Imager (MVIRI) instrument. Until 1 February 2017, Meteosat-7 provided the primary imagery coverage over the Indian Ocean and provided a service relaying data from Argos Data Collection Platforms (DCP), such as buoys, in support of the Tsunami Warning System for the Indian Ocean. A range of processed meteorological products were also produced. The last disseminated Meteosat-7 image was on 31 March 2017. Moving Meteosat-7 to its ultimate resting place in a graveyard orbit commenced on 3 April 2017 and the spacecraft final command sent on 11 April 2017.

The satellites were manufactured by a consortium COSMOS, with Aérospatiale in its Cannes Mandelieu Space Centre, as Prime, and included Matra, MBB, Selenia Spazio, Marconi Company. They are 2.1 metres in diameter and 3.195 metres long. Its initial mass in orbit is 282 kg, and in orbit, the satellite spins at 100 rpm around its main axis.

== Second Generation ("MSG") ==
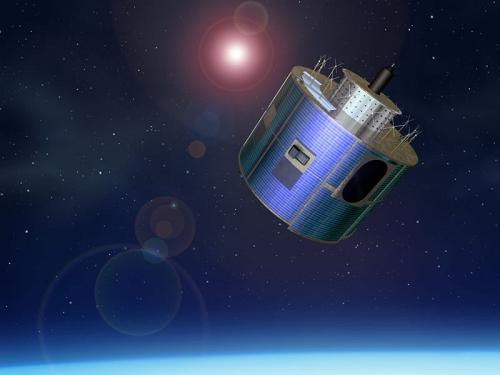
Meteosat Second Generation

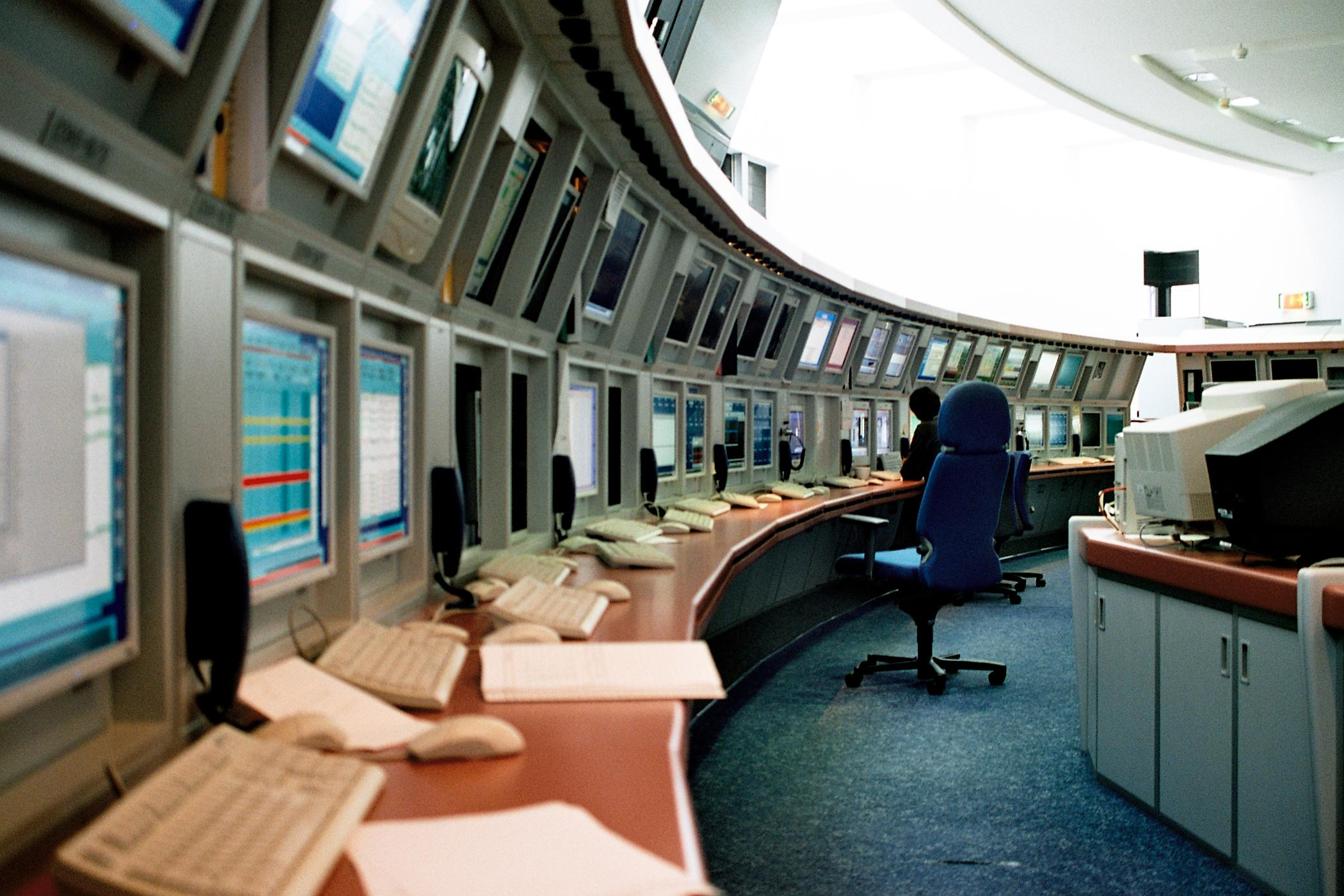
The MSG control centre in Darmstadt

Meteosat Second Generation was designed in response to user requirements to serve the needs of nowcasting applications and numerical weather prediction. In addition, the GERB instrument provides important data for climate monitoring and research. The MSG satellites are 3.2 m in diameter and 2.4 m high and spin anti-clockwise at 100 rpm at an altitude of 36,000 km.

The contract for the second generation was awarded to Aérospatiale in its Cannes Mandelieu Space Centre (now Thales Alenia Space), with main subcontractors as Matra, Messerschmitt, Alenia.

The satellites are spin-stabilised like the previous generation, but with many design improvements. The more frequent and comprehensive data collected by MSG also aids the weather forecaster in the swift recognition and prediction of dangerous weather phenomena such as thunderstorms, fog, and explosive development of small, but intense, depressions, which can lead to devastating wind storms.

On 29 January 2004 the first Meteosat Second Generation satellite MSG-1, renamed to Meteosat-8 once operational, commenced routine operations. In addition to the main optical payload SEVIRI (Spinning Enhanced Visible and Infrared Imager), Meteosat-8 also carries the secondary payload GERB (Geostationary Earth Radiation Budget) instrument. The launch of MSG-2 (renamed to Meteosat-9) took place on 21 December 2005. The launch of MSG-3 (renamed to Meteosat-10) took place on 5 July 2012.

Meteosat-8 is stationed over the Indian Ocean, arriving at 41.5°E on 21 September 2016 and it took over as prime Indian Ocean Data Coverage (IODC) spacecraft on 1 February 2017 (replacing Meteosat-7). Meteosat-8 was retired from operational service on 1 July 2022 and finally decommissioned on 13 October 2022 after twenty years in orbit. The spacecraft was disposed of in compliance with ISO-24113 guidelines (although not designed with this in mind) having been raised 740km above the geostationary ring and spun down to 20rpm. The propulsion system was then passivated and the satellite deactivated.

Meteosat-9 is also stationed over the Indian Ocean, arriving at 45.5°E on 20 April 2022 and it took over as prime IODC spacecraft on 1 June 2022 (replacing Meteosat-8).

Meteosat-10 and -11 are located over Africa with various differences in operational configuration. Since 20 March 2018, Meteosat-10 provides an operational European 'rapid scan' mode service (the MSG RSS service first commenced in May 2008), with images of Europe every 5 minutes. Since 20 February 2018, Meteosat-11 provides the main full Earth imagery service over Europe and Africa (with images every 15-minutes).

MSG-4 was successfully launched into space on 15 July 2015 at 18:42 local time on top an Ariane 5 Rocket from the Guiana Space Centre in Kourou, French Guiana. Like MSG-1, MSG-2 and MSG-3, MSG-4 was launched by Arianespace. The MSG-4 commissioning was successfully completed in December 2015 at which time the spacecraft was placed into in-orbit storage as planned, and renamed to Meteosat-11.

Satellites in the second generation Meteosat series
| Satellite | Launch date | Launch Vehicle | Launch site | Mission end |
|---|---|---|---|---|
| Meteosat-8 (MSG-1) | 2002-08-28 22:45 UTC | Ariane 5G | Kourou, ELA-3 | Retired 1 July 2022 |
| Meteosat-9 (MSG-2) | 2005-12-22 22:33 UTC | Ariane 5GS | Kourou, ELA-3 | Availability lifetime is until 2028 |
| Meteosat-10 (MSG-3) | 2012-07-05 21:36 UTC | Ariane 5ECA | Kourou, ELA-3 | Availability lifetime is until 2030 |
| Meteosat-11 (MSG-4) | 2015-07-15 21:05 UTC | Ariane 5ECA | Kourou, ELA-3 | Availability lifetime is until 2034 |

=== Secondary Payloads ===
Meteosat-8, -9, -10, and -11 each carry a GERB Instrument, DCP capable service equipment and a Search and Rescue signal Processor (SARP) that is capable of detecting 406 MHz distress signals from emergency position-indicating radiobeacon stations. For SARP, see more under Cospas-Sarsat.

== Third Generation ("MTG") ==
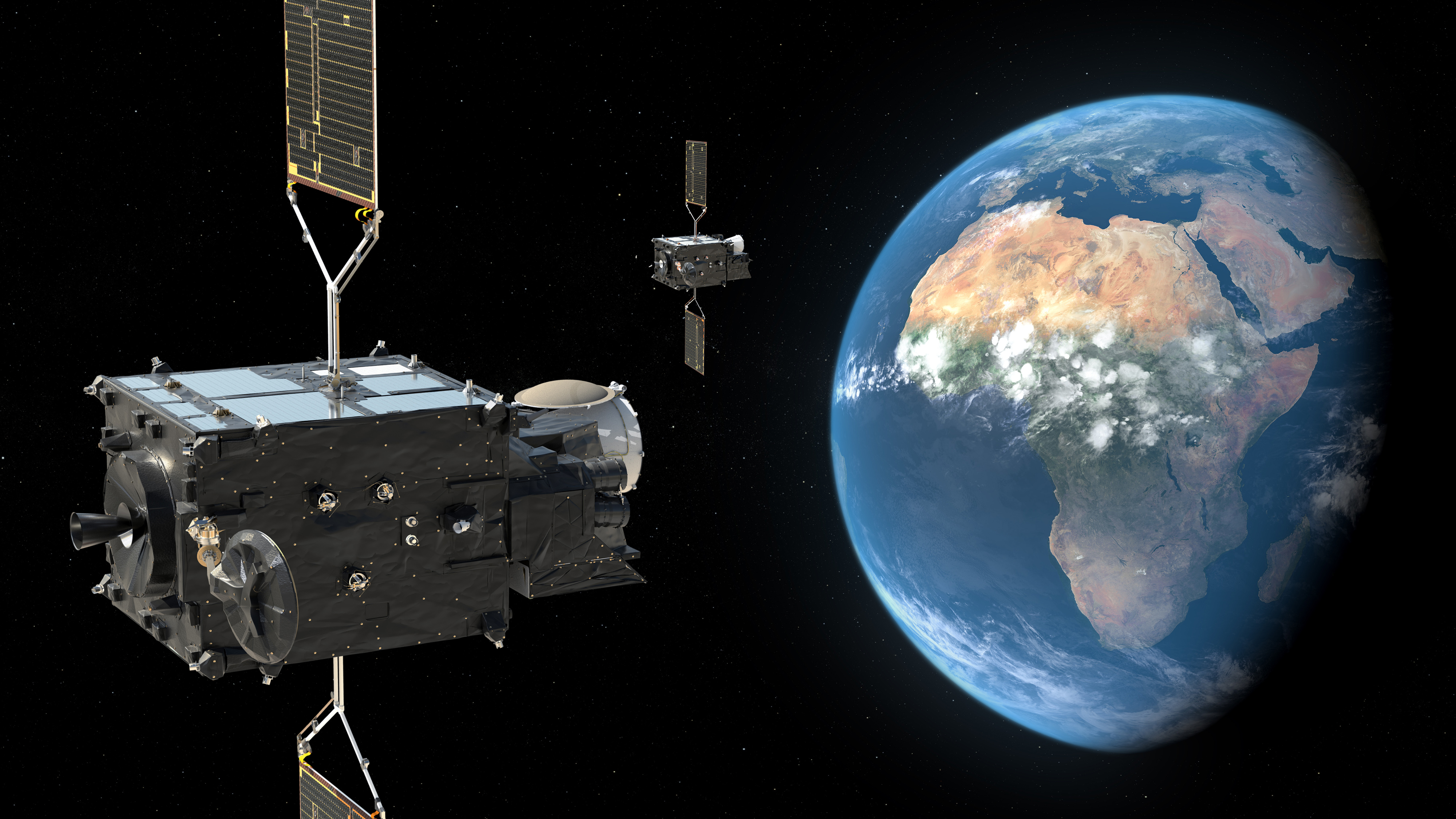
Artist's rendering of Meteosat Third Generation

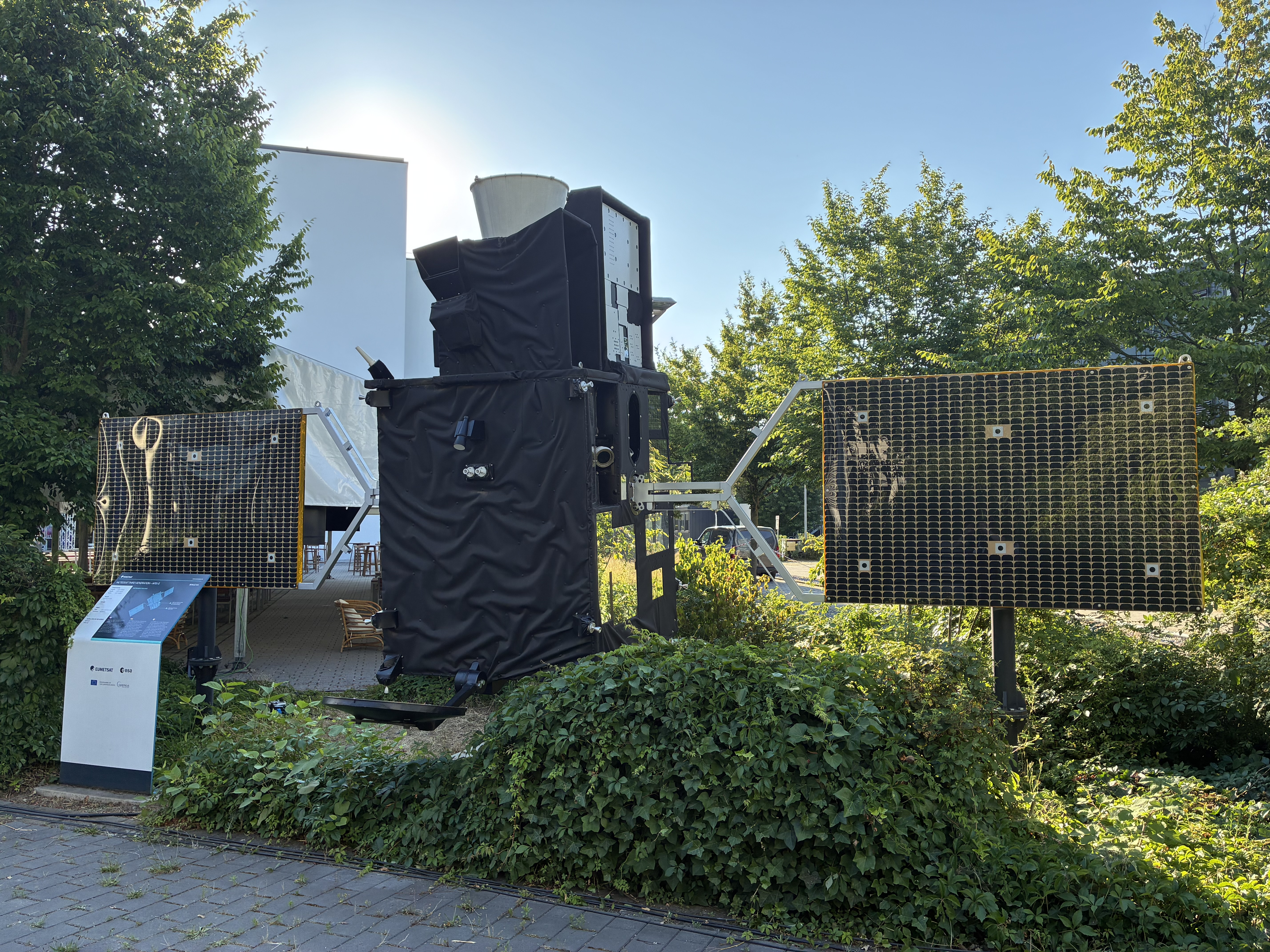
Model of MTG-S

Considering the long development cycle for a new observational space system, EUMETSAT has been working on the definition and the planning for a Meteosat Third Generation (MTG) system since the year 2000. MTG components providing continuity of MSG services need to be available before the end of the nominal lifetime of MSG. MTG preparatory activities started end of 2000 in cooperation with the European Space Agency (ESA), following the decision of the EUMETSAT Council to proceed with a Post-MSG User Consultation Process. The process is aimed at capturing the foreseeable needs of users of EUMETSAT's satellite data in the 2015-2025 timeframe.

On 19 March 2010, ESA chose Thales Alenia Space for a final negotiation leading to a contract to be signed during June. On 22 June 2010, EUMETSAT confirmed the choice of Thales Alenia Space. On 24 February 2012, the development contract between ESA and Thales Alenia Space was signed by Mr. Liebig and Mr. Seznec. Thales Alenia Space leads the industrial consortium that is now building the MTG family. Along with being the prime contractor, Thales Alenia Space is responsible for the MTG-I imaging satellite, including the primary payload, the Flexible Combined Imager. Bremen-based OHB is responsible for the MTG-S satellites and provision of the common satellite platforms, supported by Astrium GmbH as the System Architect.

=== MTG satellites ===
A total of 6 satellites are being developed under the MTG contract. Four MTG-I imaging satellites, as well as two MTG-S sounder satellites. The launch of the first MTG satellite, Meteosat-12 (MTG-I1), occurred on 13 December 2022, at 20:30 UTC and the satellite has been operational since December 2024. This was followed by the first MTG-S (MTG-S1/Sentinel-4A with the first Sentinel-4 instrument aboard) launching on 1 July 2025 at 21:04 UTC. MTG-I2 was launched in 2026. The following three satellites will be launched around 10 years later to replace the first set, which have a nominal life of 8.5 years and sufficient fuel for more than 10.7 years.

Satellites in the third generation Meteosat series
| Satellite | COSPAR ID | Launch date | Launch Vehicle | Launch site | Mission end |
|---|---|---|---|---|---|
| MTG-I1 (Meteosat-12) | 2022-170C | 13 December 2022, 20:30 UTC | Ariane 5 ECA | Kourou, ELA-3 | TBD |
| MTG-S1/Sentinel-4A (Meteosat-13) | 2025-143A | 1 July 2025, 21:04 UTC | Falcon 9 Block 5 | Kennedy, LC-39A | TBD |
| MTG-I2 (Meteosat-14) | | 27 August 2026, 20:10 UTC | Ariane 62 | Kourou, ELA-4 | TBD |
| MTG-I3 (Meteosat-15) | | Planned for 2032 | Ariane 64 | Kourou, ELA-4 | TBD |
| MTG-S2/Sentinel-4B (Meteosat-16) | | Planned for 2035 | Ariane 62 | Kourou, ELA-4 | TBD |
| MTG-I4 (Meteosat-17) | | Planned for 2036 | Ariane 64 | Kourou, ELA-4 | TBD |
