= Meteosat visible and infrared imager =

The Meteosat visible and infrared imager (or MVIRI) is the scientific instrument package on board the seven Meteosat first-generation geostationary meteorological satellites. This instrument is capable of capturing images in the visible, infrared, and water vapor regions of the electromagnetic spectrum.

== Overview ==
The MVIRI captures essential information across various spectral bands. Its primary purpose is to observe and analyze atmospheric conditions, cloud formations, and surface temperatures. Some of the main features are:

1. Spectral channels: Unlike its predecessor, the MVIRI has twelve spectral channels, all of them sensitive to specific wavelengths. By collecting data from such channels, meteorologists obtain data about cloud characteristics, land and sea temperatures, and other atmospheric phenomena.
2. Numerical weather forecasting: MVIRI significantly cooperates with numerical weather forecasting models.
3. High Resolution Visible Channel (HRV): The MVIRI includes a particular channel known as the High Resolution Visible Channel (HRV). With a finer sampling distance at nadir (directly below the satellite), around 1 kilometer, it exceeds the resolution of other visible channels (typically 3 kilometers). The HRV channel helps identify severe weather events such as storms, cyclones and cloud patterns.
4. Absorption Channels: Some MVIRI channels are specifically designed to absorb wavelengths related to atmospheric constituents. For instance:

- Ozone Channel: Detects ozone concentrations.
- Water Vapor Channel: Provides insights into water vapor distribution.
- Carbon Dioxide Channel: Helps analyze carbon dioxide levels.

== Geostationary Position ==
The Meteosat satellites, including those equipped with the MVIRI, maintain a geostationary orbit. Positioned approximately 35,786 kilometers above the equator, they remain synchronized with Earth's rotation. This fixed position allows continuous monitoring of specific regions, making them invaluable for weather forecasting, climate research, and disaster management.

== Applications ==
The MVIRI's data supports a wide range of applications:

- Weather Monitoring: Real-time cloud tracking, temperature mapping, and storm detection.
- Climate Studies: Long-term trends, climate variability, and environmental changes.
- Natural Disasters: Early warning systems for cyclones, wildfires, and floods.
- Agriculture: Assessing crop health, soil moisture, and vegetation dynamics.
