= Weather satellite =

Type of satellite designed to record the state of the Earth's atmosphere

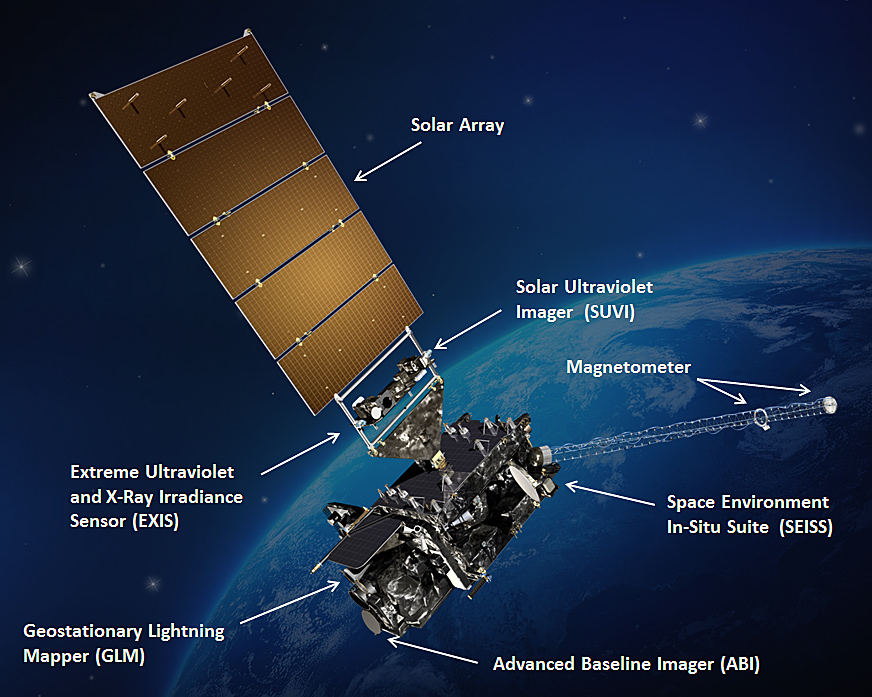
GOES-16, a United States weather satellite of the meteorological-satellite service

A weather satellite or meteorological satellite is a type of Earth observation satellite that is primarily used to monitor the weather and climate of the Earth. Satellites are mainly of two types: polar orbiting (covering the entire Earth asynchronously) or geostationary (hovering over the same spot on the equator).

While primarily used to detect the development and movement of storm systems and other cloud patterns, meteorological satellites can also detect other phenomena such as city lights, fires, effects of pollution, auroras, sand and dust storms, tornadoes, snow cover, ice mapping, boundaries of ocean currents, and energy flows. Other types of environmental information are collected using weather satellites. Weather satellite images helped in monitoring the volcanic ash cloud from Mount St. Helens and activity from other volcanoes such as Mount Etna. Smoke from fires in the western United States such as Colorado and Utah have also been monitored.

El Niño and its effects on weather are monitored daily from satellite images. The Antarctic ozone hole is mapped from weather satellite data. Collectively, weather satellites flown by the U.S., China, Europe, India, Russia, and Japan provide nearly continuous observations for a global weather watch.

== History ==
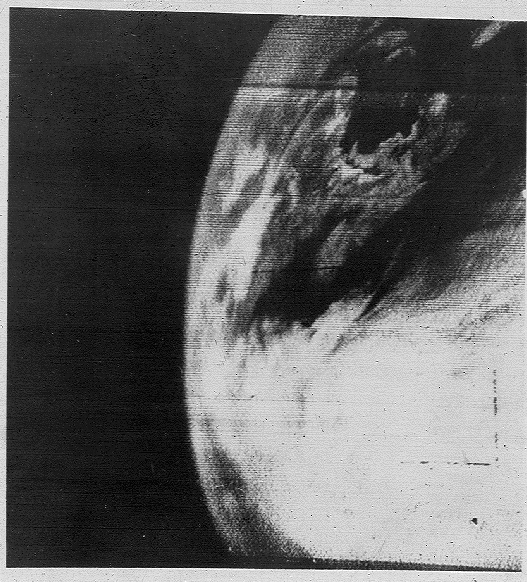
The first television image of Earth from space from the TIROS-1 weather satellite in 1960

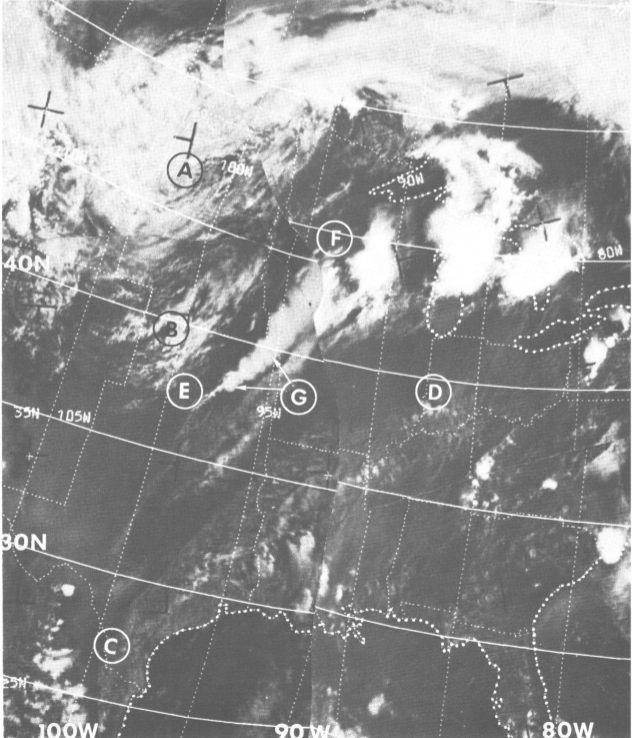
A mosaic of photographs of the United States from the ESSA-9 weather satellite, taken on June 26, 1969

=== 1950s ===
As early as 1946, the idea of cameras in orbit to observe the weather was being developed. This was due to sparse data observation coverage and the expense of using cloud cameras on rockets. By 1958, the early prototypes for TIROS and Vanguard (developed by the Army Signal Corps) were created. The first weather satellite, Vanguard 2, was launched on February 17, 1959. It was designed to measure cloud cover and resistance, but a poor axis of rotation and its elliptical orbit kept it from collecting a notable amount of useful data. The Explorer 6 and Explorer 7 satellites also contained weather-related experiments.

=== 1960s ===
The first weather satellite to be considered a success was TIROS-1, launched by NASA on April 1, 1960. TIROS operated for 78 days and proved to be much more successful than Vanguard 2. Other early weather satellite programs include the 1962 Defense Satellite Applications Program (DSAP) and the 1964 Soviet Meteor series.

TIROS paved the way for the Nimbus program, whose technology and findings are the heritage of most of the Earth-observing satellites NASA and NOAA have launched since then. Beginning with the Nimbus 3 satellite in 1969, temperature information through the tropospheric column began to be retrieved by satellites from the eastern Atlantic and most of the Pacific Ocean, which led to significant improvements to weather forecasts.

The ESSA and NOAA polar orbiting satellites followed suit from the late 1960s onward. Geostationary satellites followed, beginning with the ATS and SMS series in the late 1960s and early 1970s, then continuing with the GOES series from the 1970s onward. Polar orbiting satellites such as QuikScat and TRMM began to relay wind information near the ocean's surface starting in the late 1970s, with microwave imagery which resembled radar displays, which significantly improved the diagnoses of tropical cyclone strength, intensification, and location during the 2000s and 2010s.

=== 1970s ===
In Europe, the first Meteosat geostationary operational meteorological satellite, Meteosat-1, was launched in 1977 on a Delta launch vehicle. The satellite was a spin-stabilised cylindrical design, 2.1 m in diameter and 3.2 m tall, rotating at approx. 100 rpm and carrying the Meteosat Visible and Infrared Imager (MVIRI) instrument. Successive Meteosat first generation satellites were launched, on European Ariane-4 launchers from Kourou in French Guyana, up to and including Meteosat-7 which acquired data from 1997 until 2017, operated initially by the European Space Agency and later by the European Organisation for the Exploitation of Meteorological Satellites (EUMETSAT).

Japan has launched nine Himawari satellites beginning in 1977.

=== 1980s ===
Starting in 1988 China has launched twenty-one Fengyun satellites.

=== 2000s ===
The Meteosat Second Generation (MSG) satellites - also spin stabilised although physically larger and twice the mass of the first generation - were developed by ESA with European industry and in cooperation with EUMETSAT who then operate the satellites from their headquarters in Darmstadt, Germany with this same approach followed for all subsequent European meteorological satellites. Meteosat-8, the first MSG satellite, was launched in 2002 on an Ariane-5 launcher, carrying the Spinning Enhanced Visible and Infrared Imager (SEVIRI) and Geostationary Earth Radiation Budget (GERB) instruments, along with payloads to support the COSPAS-SARSAT Search and Rescue (SAR) and ARGOS Data Collection Platform (DCP) missions. SEVIRI provided an increased number of spectral channels over MVIRI and imaged the full-Earth disc at double the rate. Meteosat-9 was launched to complement Meteosat-8 in 2005, with the second pair consisting of Meteosat-10 and Meteosat-11 launched in 2012 and 2015, respectively.

In 2006, the first European low-Earth orbit operational meteorological satellite, Metop-A was launched into a Sun-synchronous orbit at 817 km altitude by a Soyuz launcher from Baikonur, Kazakhstan. This operational satellite - which forms the space segment of the EUMETSAT Polar System (EPS) - built on the heritage from ESA's ERS and Envisat experimental missions, and was followed at six-year intervals by Metop-B and Metop-C - the latter launched from French Guyana in a "Europeanised" Soyuz. Each carry thirteen different passive and active instruments ranging in design from imagers and sounders to a scatterometer and a radio-occultation instrument. The satellite service module is based on the SPOT-5 bus, while the payload suite is a combination of new and heritage instruments from both Europe and the US under the Initial Joint Polar System agreement between EUMETSAT and NOAA.

=== 2010s ===
The DSCOVR satellite, owned by NOAA, was launched in 2015 and became the first deep space satellite that can observe and predict space weather. It can detect potentially dangerous weather such as solar wind and geomagnetic storms. This is what has given humanity the capability to make accurate and preemptive space weather forecasts since the late 2010s.

=== 2020s ===
The Meteosat Third Generation (MTG) programme launched its first satellite, Meteosat-12, in 2022, and featured a number of significant changes over its predecessors in support of its mission to gather data for weather forecasting and climate monitoring. The MTG satellites are three-axis stabilised rather than spin-stabilised, giving greater flexibility in satellite and instrument design. The MTG system features separate Imager and Sounder satellite models that share the same satellite bus, with a baseline of three satellites - two Imagers and one Sounder - forming the operational configuration.

The imager satellites carry the Flexible Combined Imager (FCI), succeeding MVIRI and SEVIRI to give even greater resolution and spectral coverage, scanning the full Earth disc every ten minutes, as well as a new Lightning Imager (LI) payload. The sounder satellites carry the Infrared Sounder (IRS) and Ultra-violet Visible Near-infrared (UVN) instruments. UVN is part of the European Commission's Copernicus programme and fulfils the Sentinel-4 mission to monitor air quality, trace gases and aerosols over Europe hourly at high spatial resolution. Two MTG satellites - one Imager and one Sounder - will operate in close proximity from the 0-deg geostationary location over western Africa to observe the eastern Atlantic Ocean, Europe, Africa and the Middle East, while a second imager satellite will operate from 9.5-deg East to perform a Rapid Scanning mission over Europe. MTG continues Meteosat support to the ARGOS and Search and Rescue missions. MTG-I1 launched in one of the last Ariane-5 launches, while MTG-S1 launched in 2025 on a SpaceX Falcon 9, carrying the Sentinel-4 instrument for the EC's Copernicus programme. MTG-I2 will launch in August 2026 on an Ariane-6, the first instance of using an Ariane-62 variant to launch a satellite into geostationary orbit. A further triplet of MTG satellites is planned for launch in the 2030s, continuing the MTG mission into the early 2040s.

A second generation of Metop satellites (MetOp-SG) has also begun deployment, with the first satellite (Metop-SGA1) launched in 2025 on an Ariane-62, carrying the Sentinel-5 instrument for the EC's Copernicus programme. The Metop-SG space segment also has two satellite models based on a common platform, with one satellite of each model operated as a pair required to complete the full instrument complement of the operational baseline for EUMETSAT's EPSSG mission. The second satellite, and first of the B-models (Metop-SGB1), will launch on Ariane-6 in late 2026. Two further pairs of Metop-SG satellites are planned for launch in the early- and late-2030s, continuing the EPSSG mission into the 2040s.

== Observation ==
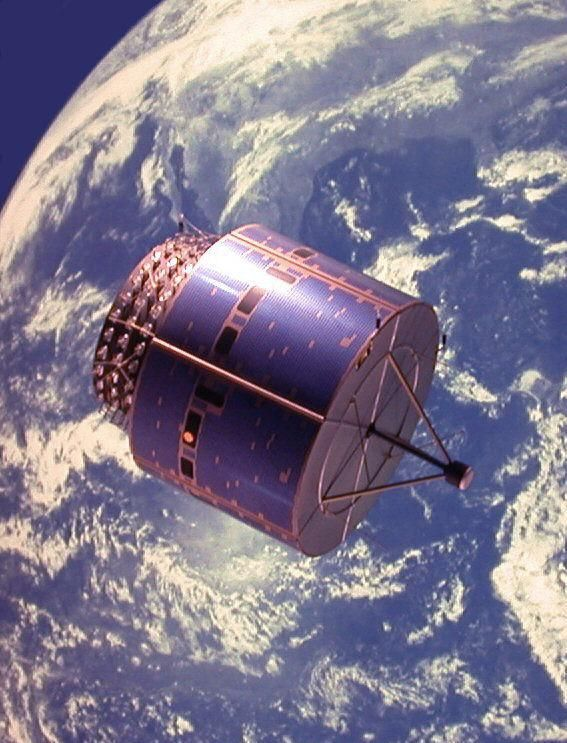
These meteorological-satellite service, however, see more than clouds and cloud systems

Observation is typically made via different 'channels' of the electromagnetic spectrum, in particular, the visible and infrared portions.

Some of these channels include:

- Visible and Near Infrared: 0.6–1.6 μm – for recording cloud cover during the day
- Infrared: 3.9–7.3 μm (water vapor), 8.7–13.4 μm (thermal imaging)

=== Visible spectrum ===
Visible-light images from weather satellites during local daylight hours are easy to interpret even by the average person, clouds, cloud systems such as fronts and tropical storms, lakes, forests, mountains, snow ice, fires, and pollution such as smoke, smog, dust and haze are readily apparent. Even wind can be determined by cloud patterns, alignments and movement from successive photos.

=== Infrared spectrum ===
The thermal or infrared images recorded by sensors called scanning radiometers enable a trained analyst to determine cloud heights and types, to calculate land and surface water temperatures, and to locate ocean surface features. Infrared satellite imagery can be used effectively for tropical cyclones with a visible eye pattern, using the Dvorak technique, where the difference between the temperature of the warm eye and the surrounding cold cloud tops can be used to determine its intensity (colder cloud tops generally indicate a more intense storm). Infrared pictures depict ocean eddies or vortices and map currents such as the Gulf Stream which are valuable to the shipping industry. Fishermen and farmers are interested in knowing land and water temperatures to protect their crops against frost or increase their catch from the sea. Even El Niño phenomena can be spotted. Using color-digitized techniques, the gray shaded thermal images can be converted to color for easier identification of desired information.

== Types ==
The geostationary Himawari 8 satellite's first true-colour composite PNG image

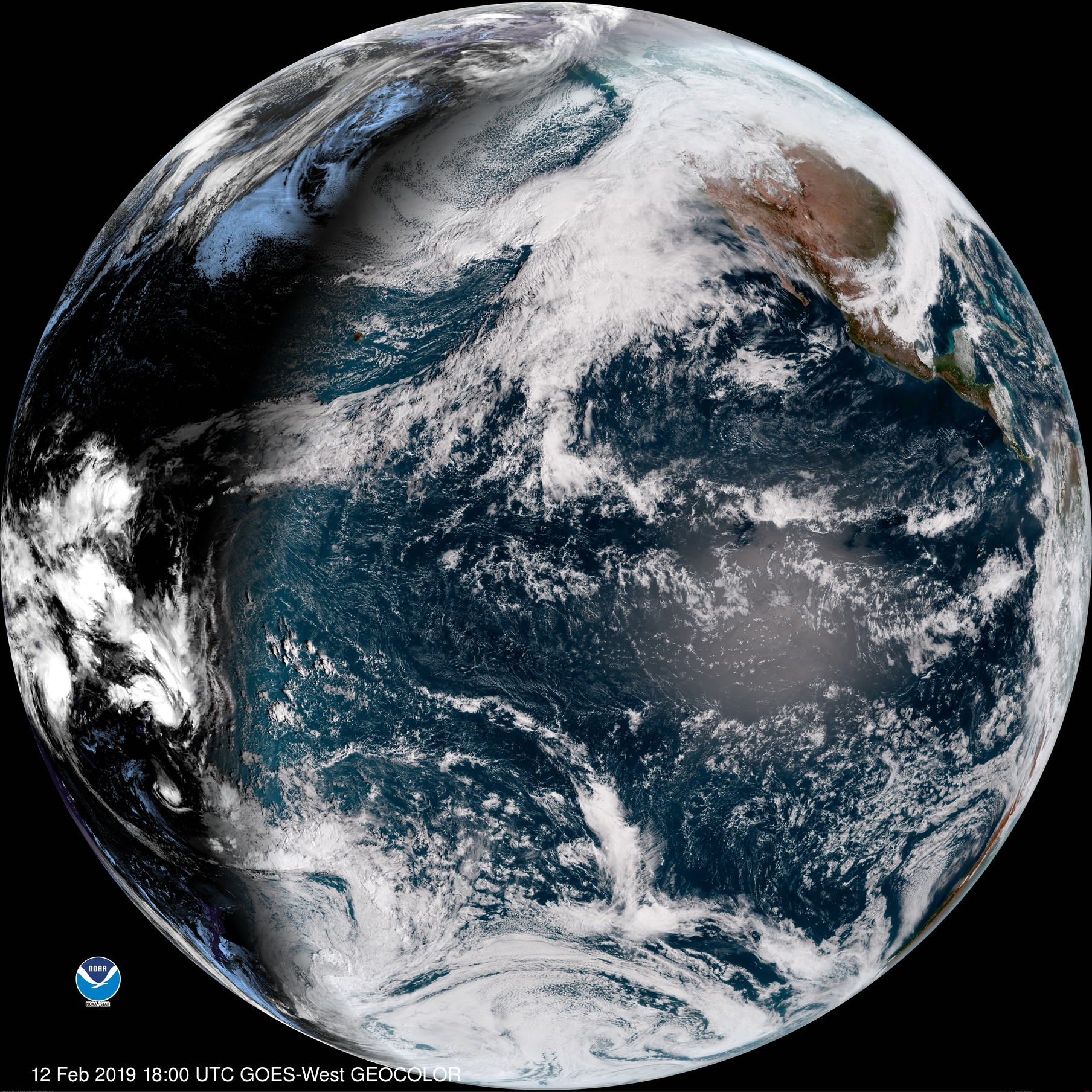
The geostationary GOES-17 satellite's Level 1B Calibrated Radiances - True Colour Composite PNG image

Each meteorological satellite is designed to use one of two different classes of orbit: geostationary and polar orbiting.

=== Geostationary ===
Geostationary weather satellites orbit the Earth above the equator at altitudes of 35,880 km (22,300 miles). Because of this orbit, they remain stationary with respect to the rotating Earth and thus can record or transmit images of the entire hemisphere below continuously with their visible-light and infrared sensors. The news media use the geostationary photos in their daily weather presentation as single images or made into movie loops. These are also available on the city forecast pages of www.noaa.gov (example Dallas, TX).

Several geostationary meteorological spacecraft are in operation. The United States' GOES series has three in operation: GOES-15, GOES-16 and GOES-17. GOES-16 and-17 remain stationary over the Atlantic and Pacific Oceans, respectively. GOES-15 was retired in early July 2019.

The satellite GOES 13 that was previously owned by the National Oceanic and Atmospheric Association (NOAA) was transferred to the U.S. Space Force in 2019 and renamed the EWS-G1; becoming the first geostationary weather satellite to be owned and operated by the U.S. Department of Defense.

Russia's new-generation weather satellite Elektro-L No.1 operates at 76°E over the Indian Ocean. The Japanese have the MTSAT-2 located over the mid Pacific at 145°E and the Himawari 8 at 140°E. The Europeans have four in operation, Meteosat-8 (41.5°E) and Meteosat-9 (0°) over the Atlantic Ocean and have Meteosat-6 (63°E) and Meteosat-7 (57.5°E) over the Indian Ocean. China currently has four Fengyun (风云) geostationary satellites (FY-2E at 86.5°E, FY-2F at 123.5°E, FY-2G at 105°E and FY-4A at 104.5 °E) operated. India also operates geostationary satellites called INSAT which carry instruments for meteorological purposes.

=== Polar orbiting ===
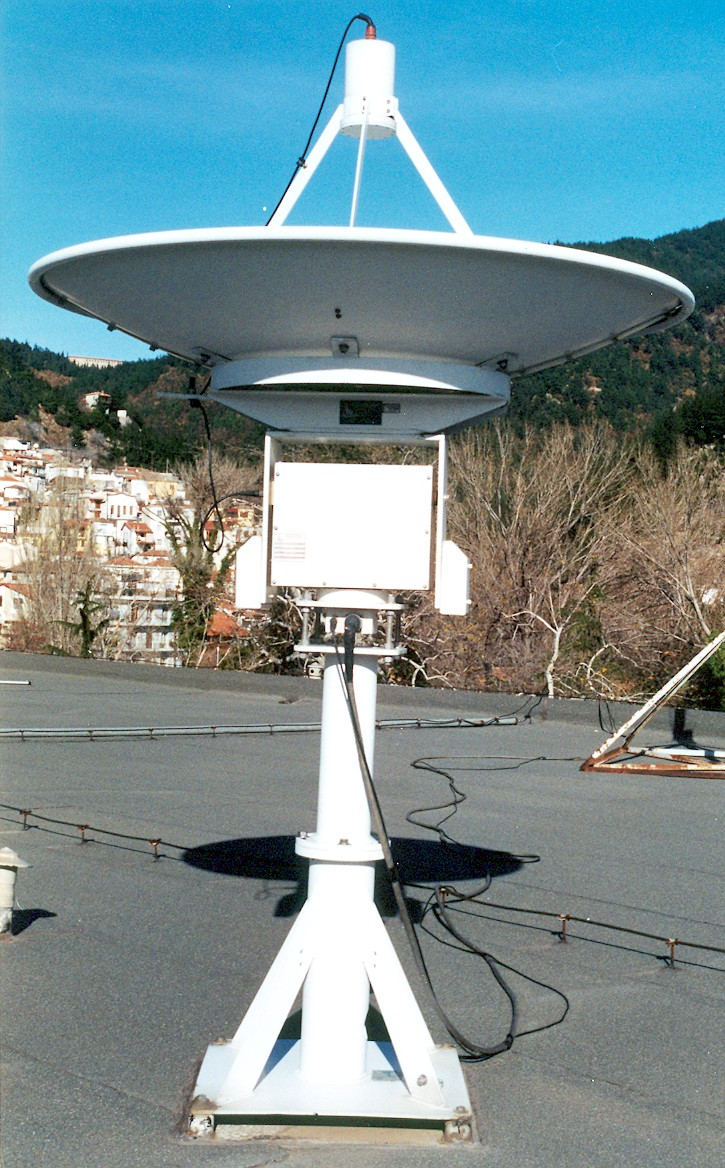
Computer-controlled motorized parabolic dish antenna for tracking LEO weather satellites.

Polar orbiting weather satellites circle the Earth at a typical altitude of 850 km (530 miles) in a north to south (or vice versa) path, passing over the poles in their continuous flight. Polar orbiting weather satellites are in sun-synchronous orbits, which means they are able to observe any place on Earth and will view every location twice each day with the same general lighting conditions due to the near-constant local solar time. Instruments onboard polar orbiting weather satellites offer a much higher resolution than their geostationary counterparts due their proximity to the Earth's surface.

The United States has several series of polar orbiting meteorological satellites, presently NOAA-20, and NOAA-21 (JPSS) operated by NOAA, and the DMSP, operated by the United States Space Force. Europe has the Metop-B and Metop-C satellites operated by EUMETSAT. Russia has the Meteor and Resurs-P series of satellites. China has FY-3A, 3B, and 3C.

== Uses ==
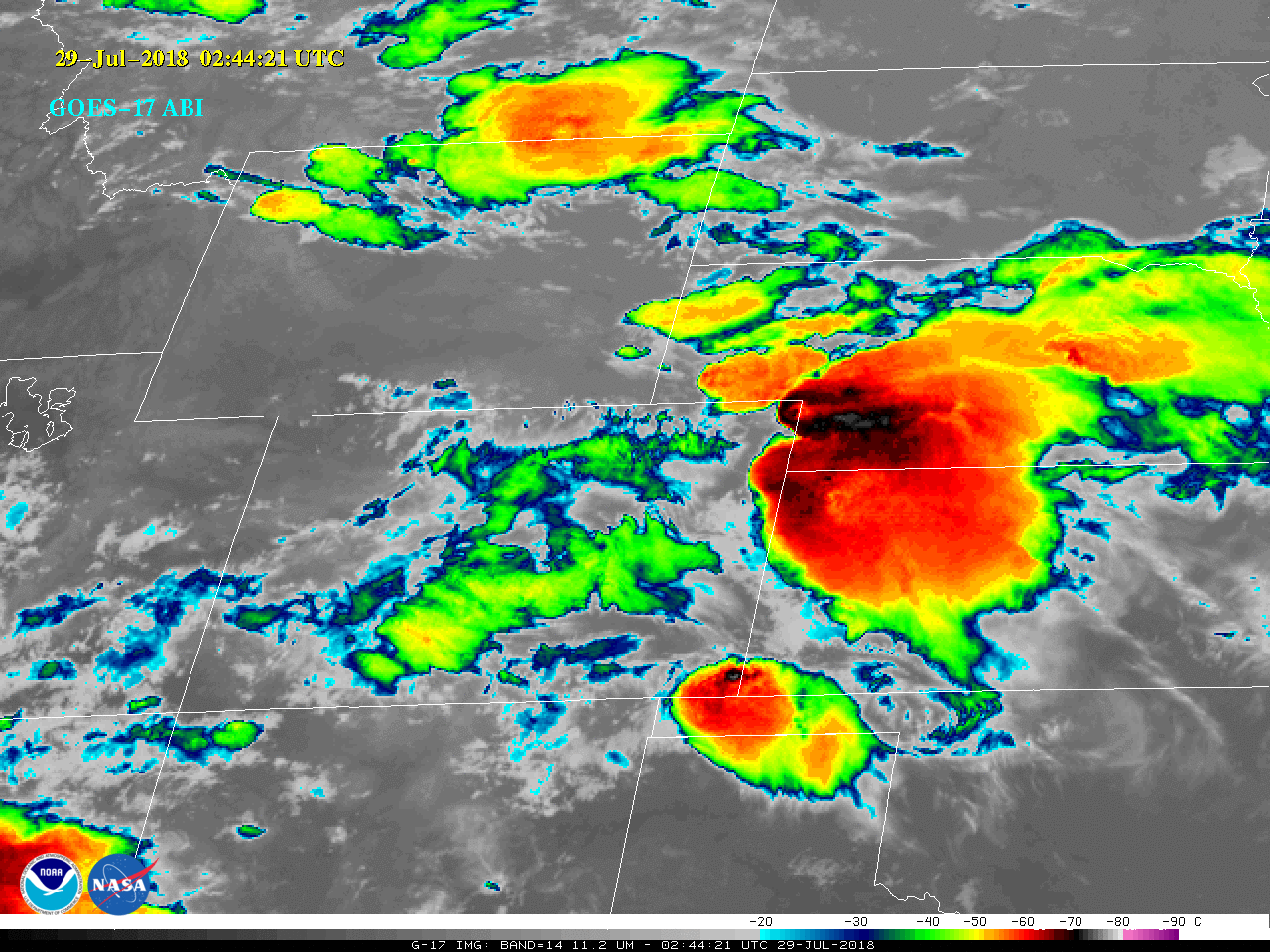
Infrared image of storms over the central United States from the GOES-17 satellite

Snowfield monitoring, especially in the Sierra Nevada, can be helpful to the hydrologist keeping track of available snowpack for runoff vital to the watersheds of the western United States. This information is gleaned from existing satellites of all agencies of the U.S. government (in addition to local, on-the-ground measurements). Ice floes, packs, and bergs can also be located and tracked from weather spacecraft.

Even pollution whether it is nature-made or human-made can be pinpointed. The visual and infrared photos show effects of pollution from their respective areas over the entire earth. Aircraft and rocket pollution, as well as condensation trails, can also be spotted. The ocean current and low level wind information gleaned from the space photos can help predict oceanic oil spill coverage and movement. Almost every summer, sand and dust from the Sahara Desert in Africa drifts across the equatorial regions of the Atlantic Ocean. GOES-EAST photos enable meteorologists to observe, track and forecast this sand cloud. In addition to reducing visibilities and causing respiratory problems, sand clouds suppress hurricane formation by modifying the solar radiation balance of the tropics. Other dust storms in Asia and mainland China are common and easy to spot and monitor, with recent examples of dust moving across the Pacific Ocean and reaching North America.

In remote areas of the world with few local observers, fires could rage out of control for days or even weeks and consume huge areas before authorities are alerted. Weather satellites can be a valuable asset in such situations. Nighttime photos also show the burn-off in gas and oil fields. Atmospheric temperature and moisture profiles have been taken by weather satellites since 1969.

== Non-imaging sensors ==
Not all weather satellites are direct imagers. Some satellites are sounders that take measurements of a single pixel at a time. They have no horizontal spatial resolution but often are capable or resolving vertical atmospheric layers. Soundings along the satellite ground track can still be gridded later to form maps.

== International regulation ==
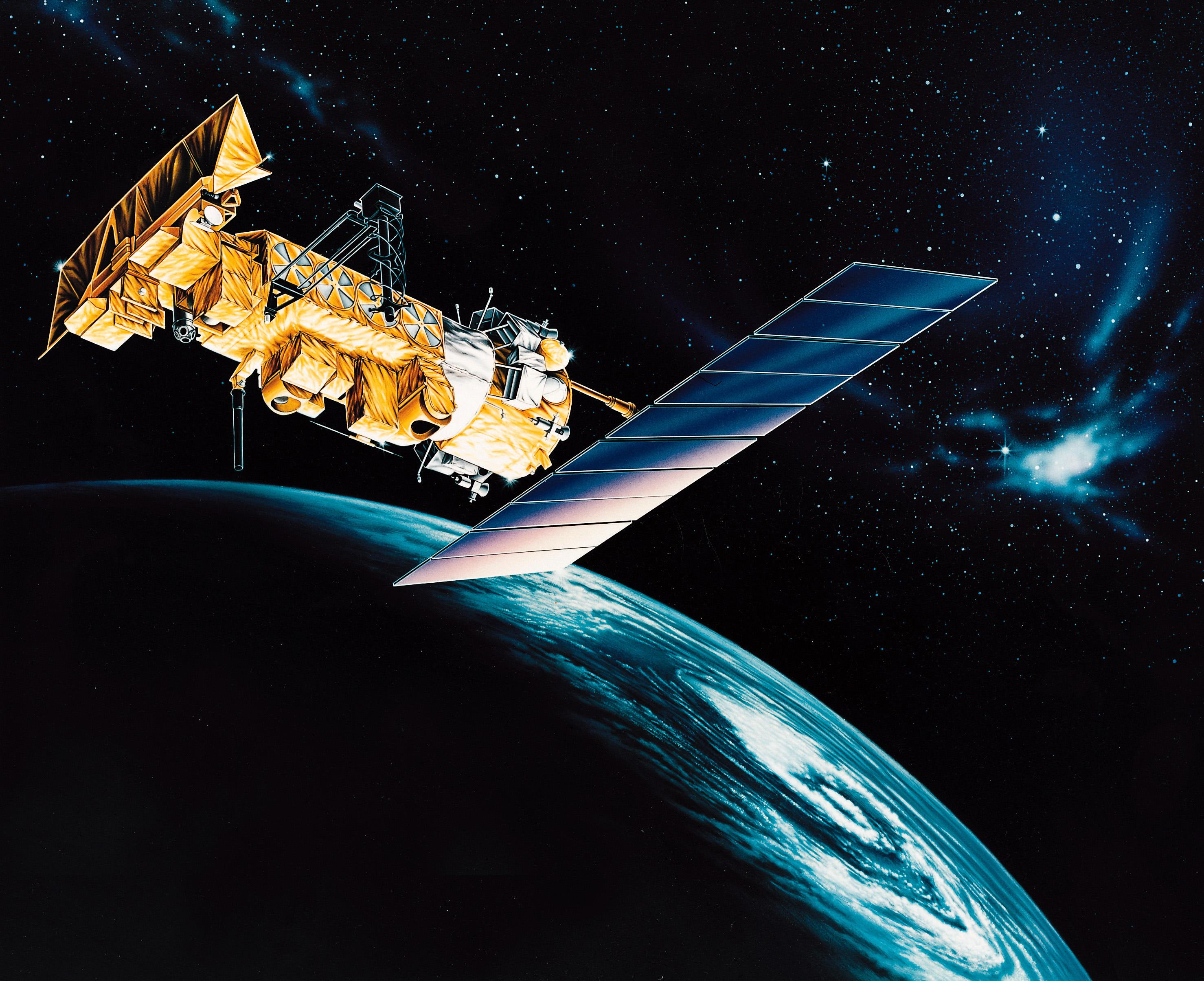
Weather observation satellite-system, NOAA-M spacecrft

According to the International Telecommunication Union (ITU), a meteorological-satellite service (also: meteorological-satellite radiocommunication service) is – according to Article 1.52 of the ITU Radio Regulations (RR) – defined as « An earth exploration-satellite service for meteorological purposes.»

=== Classification ===
This radiocommunication service is classified in accordance with ITU Radio Regulations (article 1) as follows:
Fixed service (article 1.20)

- Fixed-satellite service (article 1.21)
- Inter-satellite service (article 1.22)
- Earth exploration-satellite service (article 1.51)
  - Meteorological-satellite service

=== Frequency allocation ===
The allocation of radio frequencies is provided according to Article 5 of the ITU Radio Regulations (edition 2012).

In order to improve harmonisation in spectrum utilisation, the majority of service-allocations stipulated in this document were incorporated in national Tables of Frequency Allocations and Utilisations which is with-in the responsibility of the appropriate national administration. The allocation might be primary, secondary, exclusive, and shared.

- primary allocation: is indicated by writing in capital letters (see example below)
- secondary allocation: is indicated by small letters
- exclusive or shared utilization: is within the responsibility of administrations

Example of frequency allocation

Allocation to services
Region 1	Region 2	Region 3
401-402 MHz METEOROLOGICAL AIDS SPACE OPERATION (space-to-Earth); EARTH EXPLORATION-SATELLITE (Earth-to-space); METEOROLOGICAL-SATELLITE (Earth-to-space); Fixed; Mobile except aeronautical mobile
8 817.50-8 821.50 MHz METEOROLOGICAL-SATELLITE (Earth-to-space) and other services

== See also ==
- Earth observation satellite
- Environmental satellite
  - List of Earth observation satellites
- Geostationary orbit
- Kosmos 122
- Low Earth orbit
  - Meteorological-satellite radiocommunication service
- Remote sensing
