= MTG-I1 =

European Geosynchronous Meteorology satellite

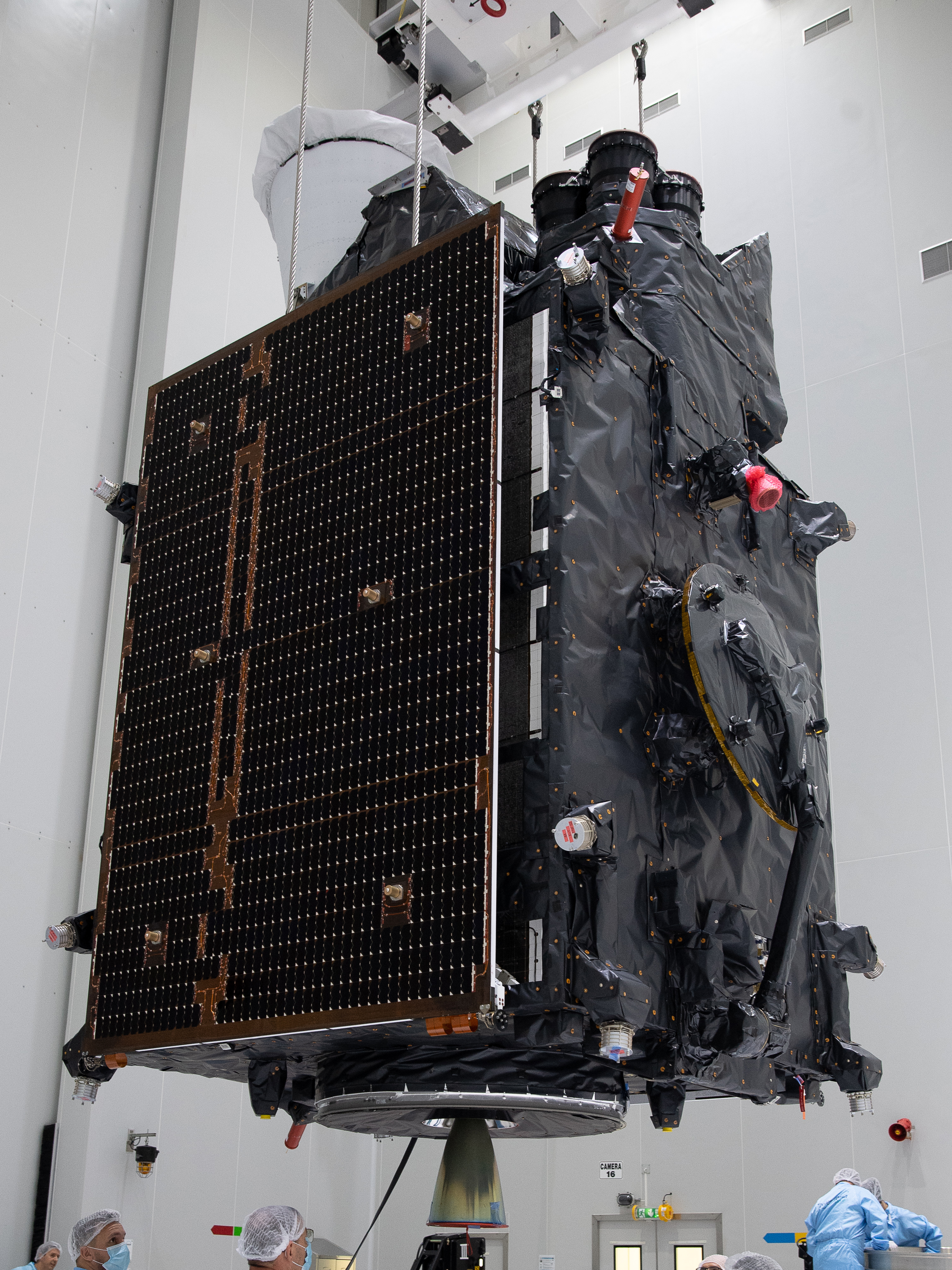
- MTG-I1 Satellite before launch
- Mission type: Meteorology
- Operator: EUMETSAT
- COSPAR ID: 2022-170C
- SATCAT no.: 54743
- Website: MTG (EUMETSAT); MTG (ESA)
- Mission duration: Planned: 8.5 years

Spacecraft properties
- Spacecraft type: MTG-I
- Bus: SmallGEO
- Manufacturer: Thales Alenia Space
- Launch mass: 3,760 kg (8,290 lb)

Start of mission
- Launch date: 13 December 2022, 20:30 UTC
- Rocket: Ariane 5 ECA (VA-259)
- Launch site: Kourou ELA-3
- Contractor: Arianespace

Orbital parameters
- Reference system: Geocentric
- Regime: GEO

MTG-I1, officially designated Meteosat-12 upon entering operational service, is the first of four imaging satellite of the Meteosat Third Generation (MTG) system developed by EUMETSAT in cooperation with the European Space Agency (ESA). Launched on 13 December 2022, it became fully operational on 7 January 2024, replacing MSG-4 as the prime geostationary meteorological satellite over Europe and Africa.

== Timeline ==
=== Development ===
- In November 2010, ESA awarded a contract to Astrium (now part of Airbus Defence and Space) to develop and build four MTG-I satellites. At the time, the launches were expected to happen in 2017.
- In November 2012, ESA and EUMETSAT signed an agreement to cooperate on MTG Program.

=== Launch campaign ===
- In March 2022, MTG-I1 satellite had completed all functional and environmental tests and was pronounced ready for transport to the launch site.
- On 29 September 2022, the MTG-I1 satellite left Marseille on board the MN Toucan cargo ship and arrived at Kourou on 18 October.
- On 6 December 2022, ESA announced that the MTG-I1 satellite would launch no earlier than 13 July 2022, 20:30 UTC
- On 12 December 2022, Arianespace rolled out the Ariane 5 carrying the MTG-I1 satellite and two other satellites (Galaxy-35 & 36 for Intelsat) to the pad.
- Ariane 5 with the MTG-I1 satellite launched on 13 December 2022 at 20:20 UTC toward geostationary transfer orbit.

=== In orbit ===
- In May 2023, ESA published first preliminary images from the MTG-I1 mission.

== Gallery: launch ==
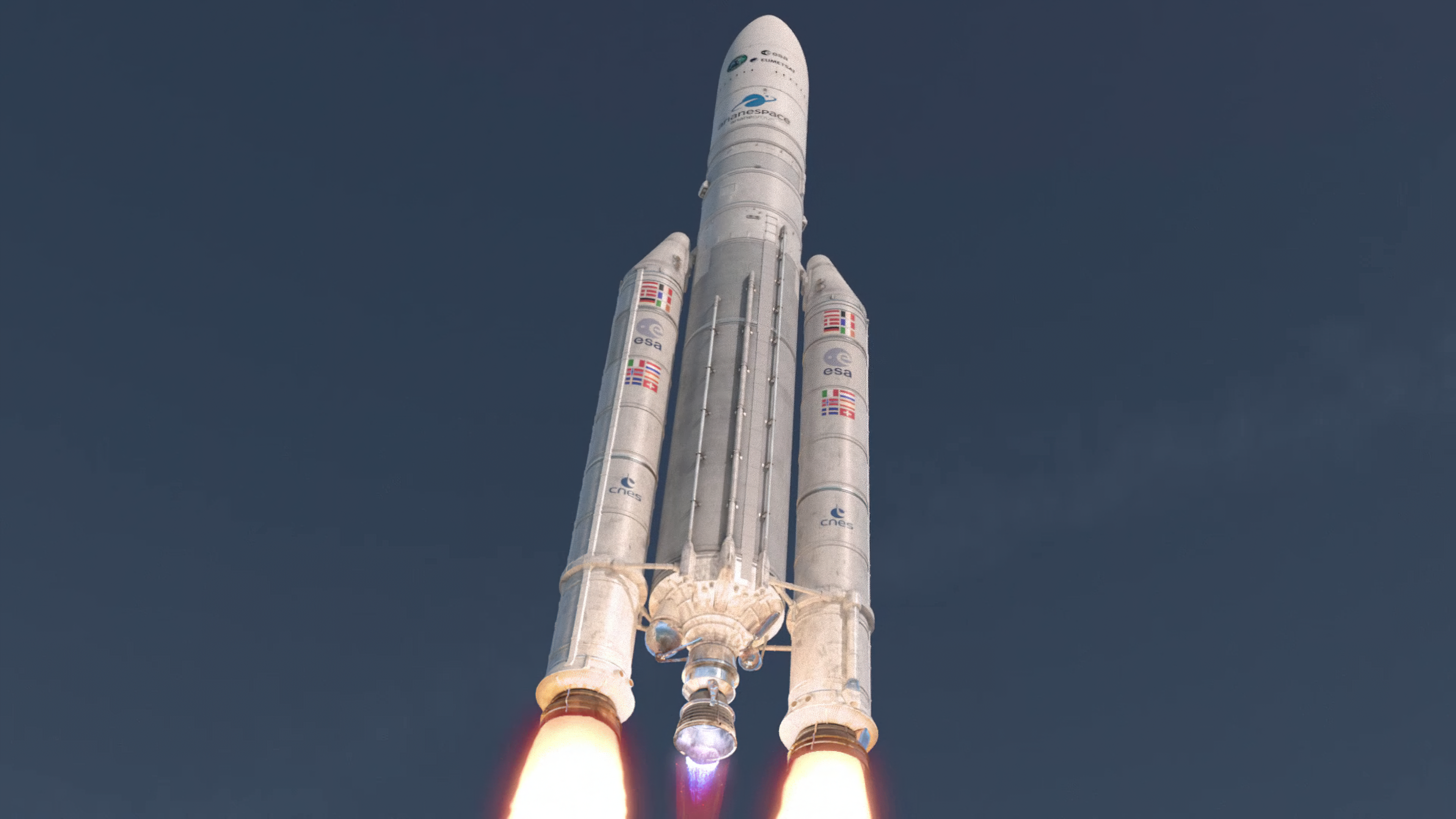

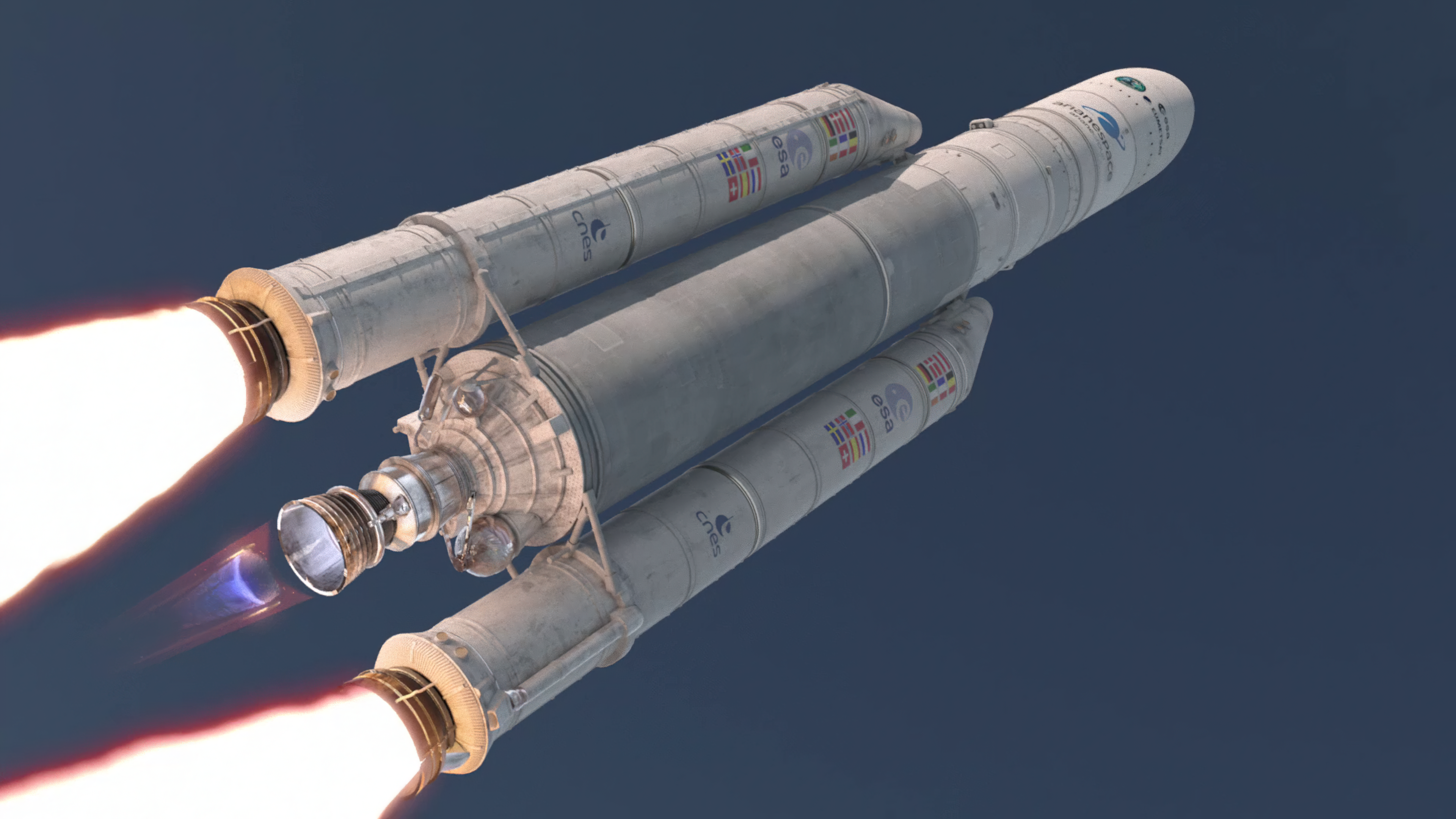
Artistic Representation of MTG-I1 on Ariane 5 during liftoff

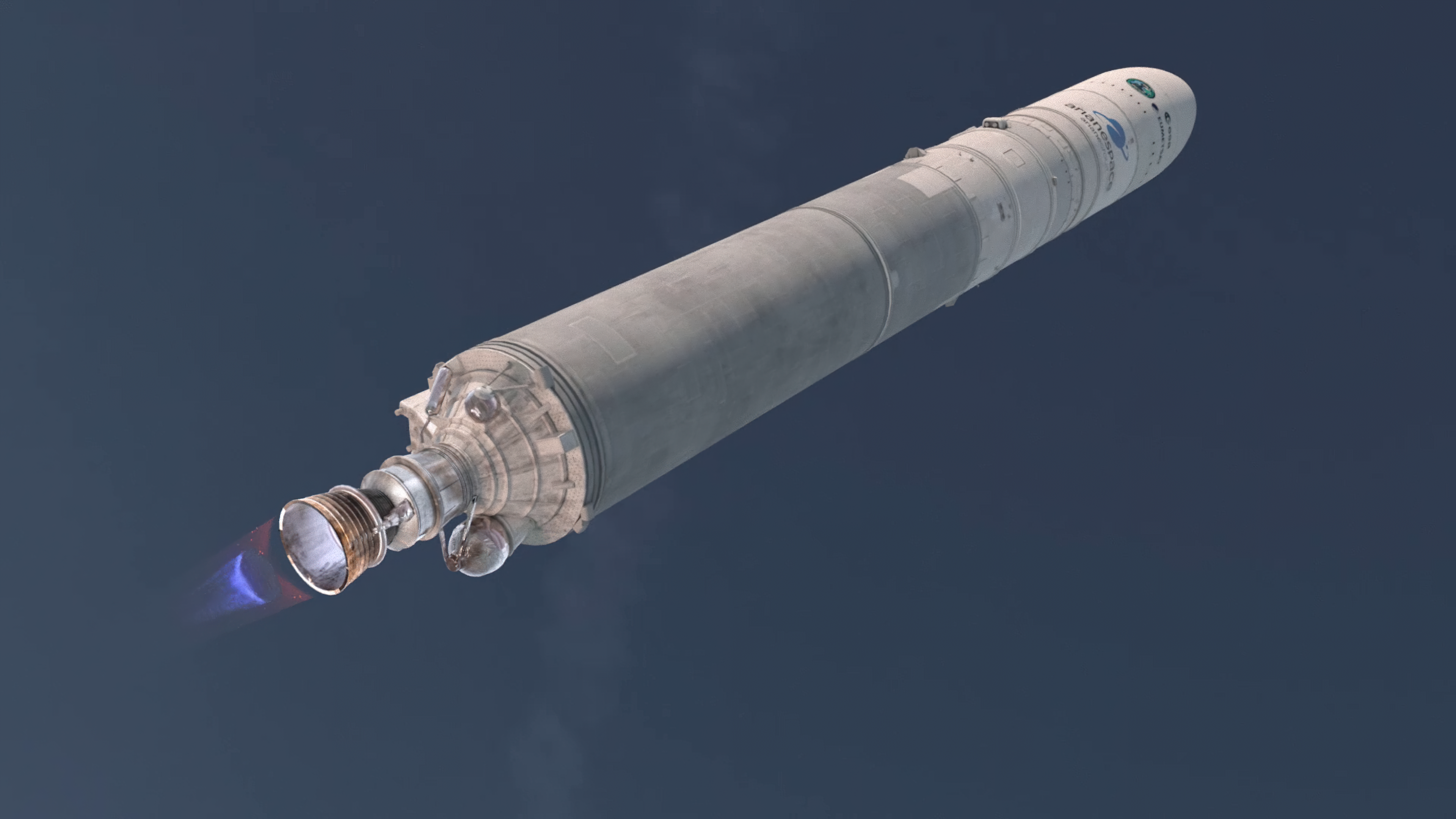
Artistic Representation of MTG-I1 on Ariane 5 during booster separation

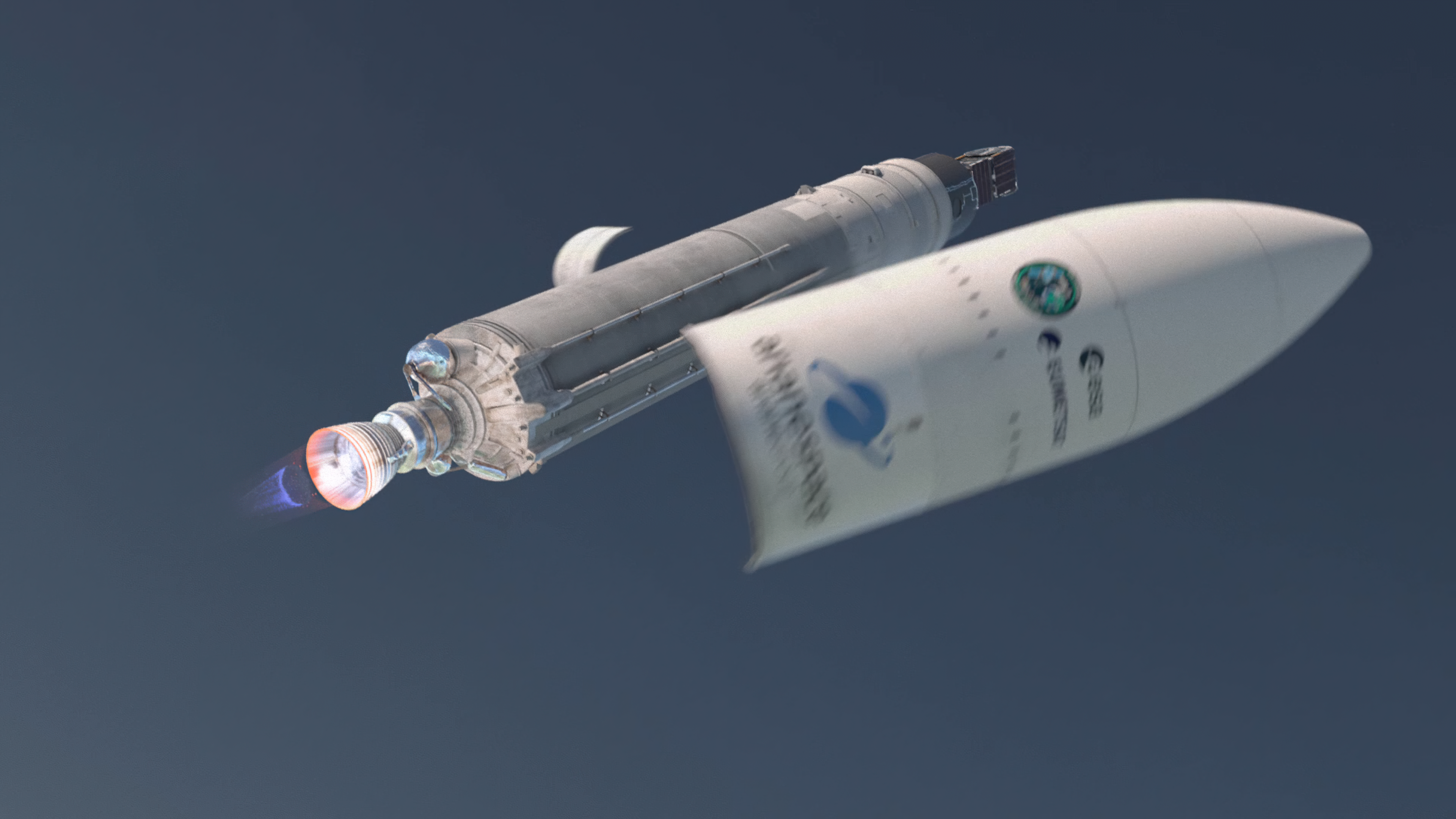
Artistic Representation of MTG-I1 on Ariane 5 during fairing separation

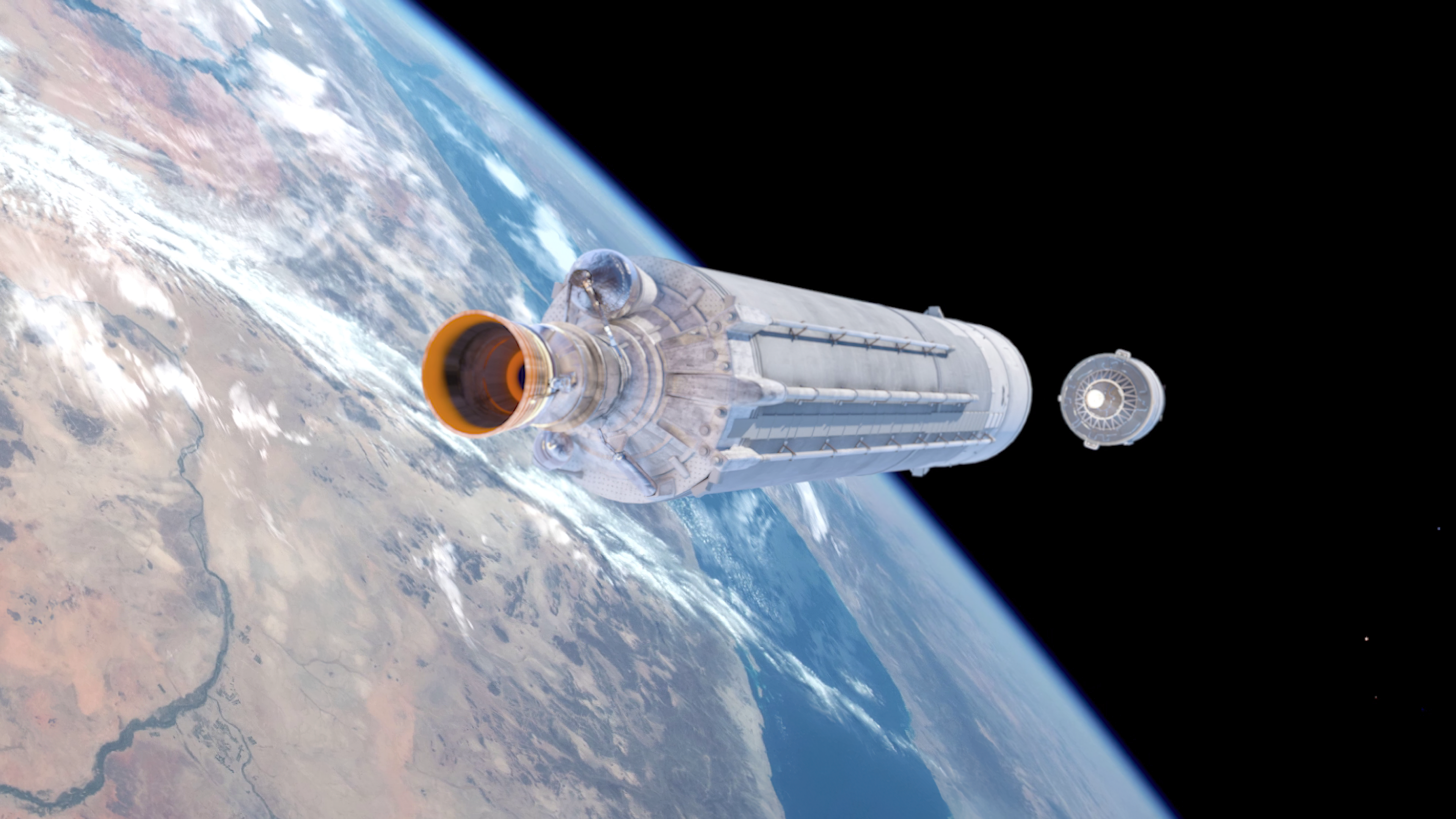
Artistic Representation of MTG-I1 on Ariane 5 during core stage separation and upper stage ignition

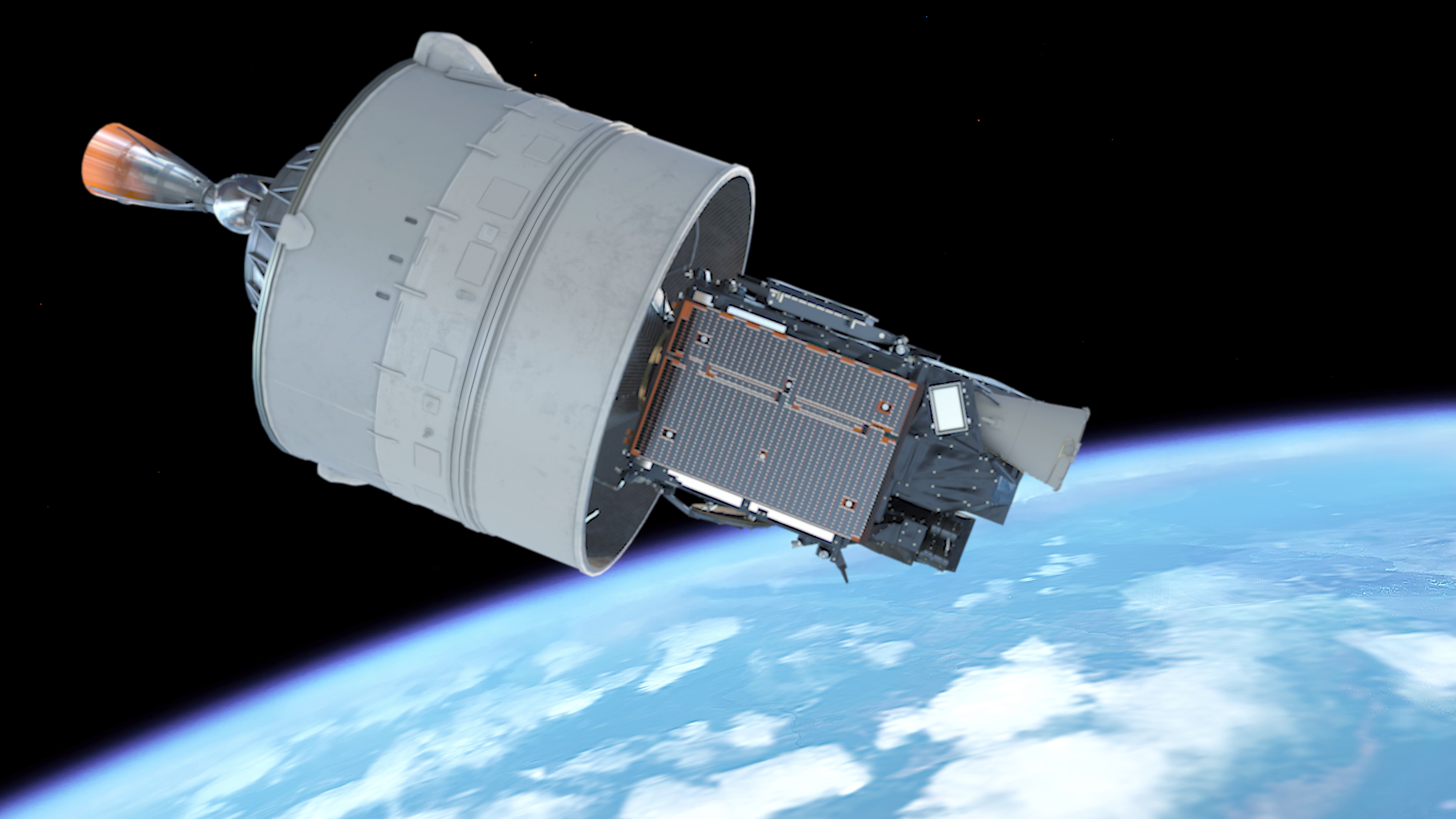
Artistic Representation of MTG-I1 on Ariane 5 during Sylda separation

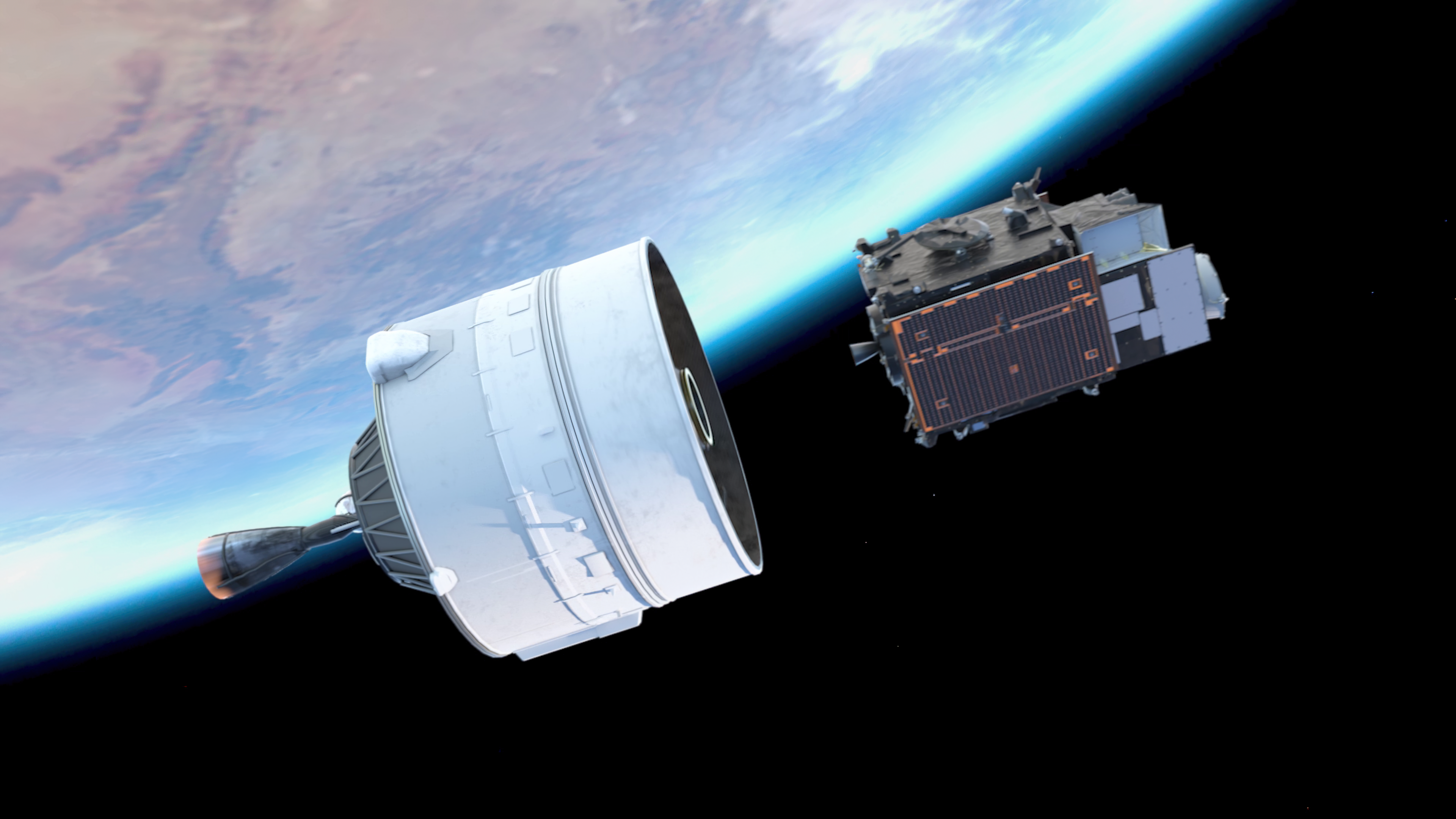
Artistic Representation of MTG-I1 during spacecraft separation

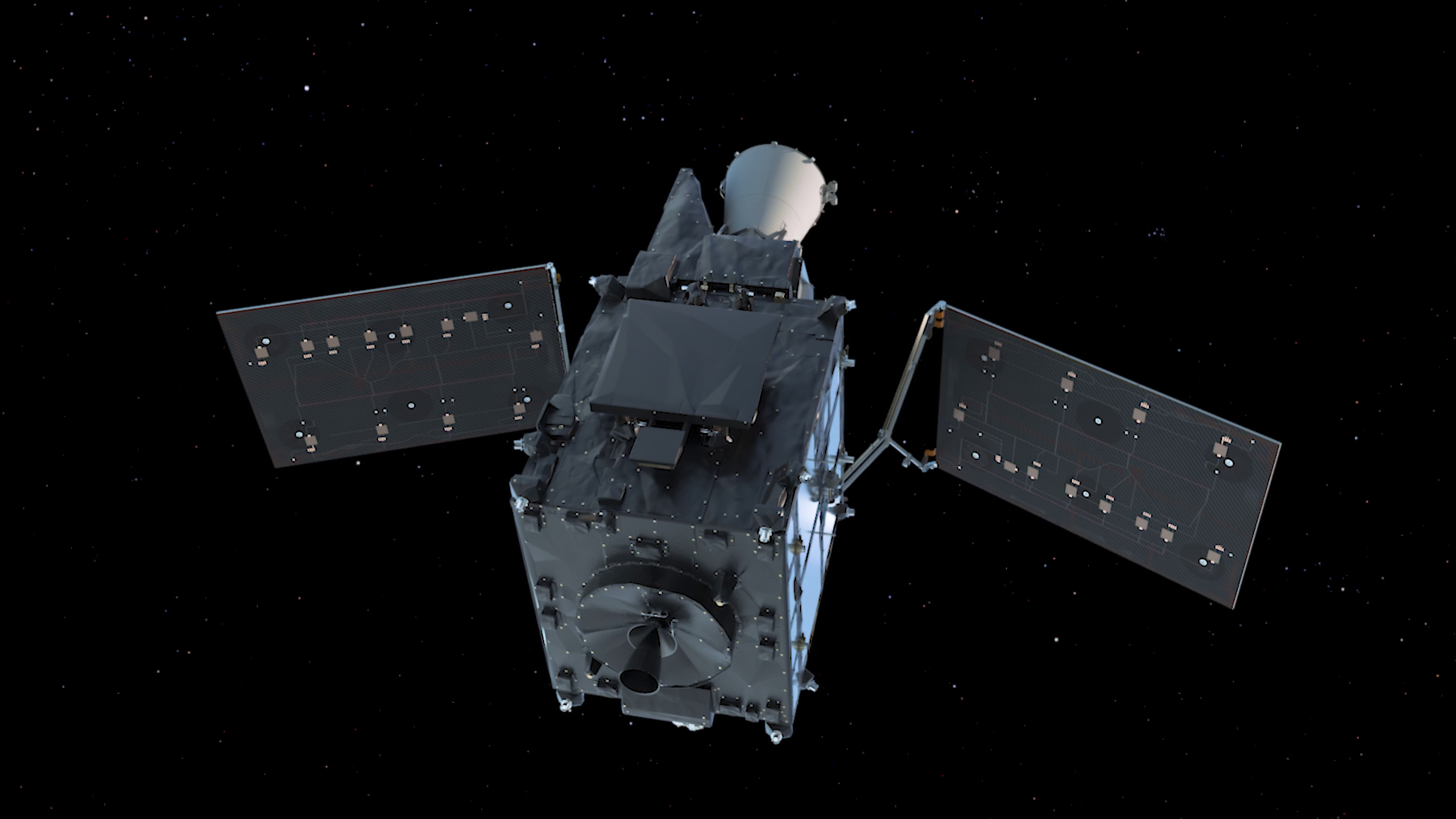
Artistic Representation of MTG-I1 during solar array

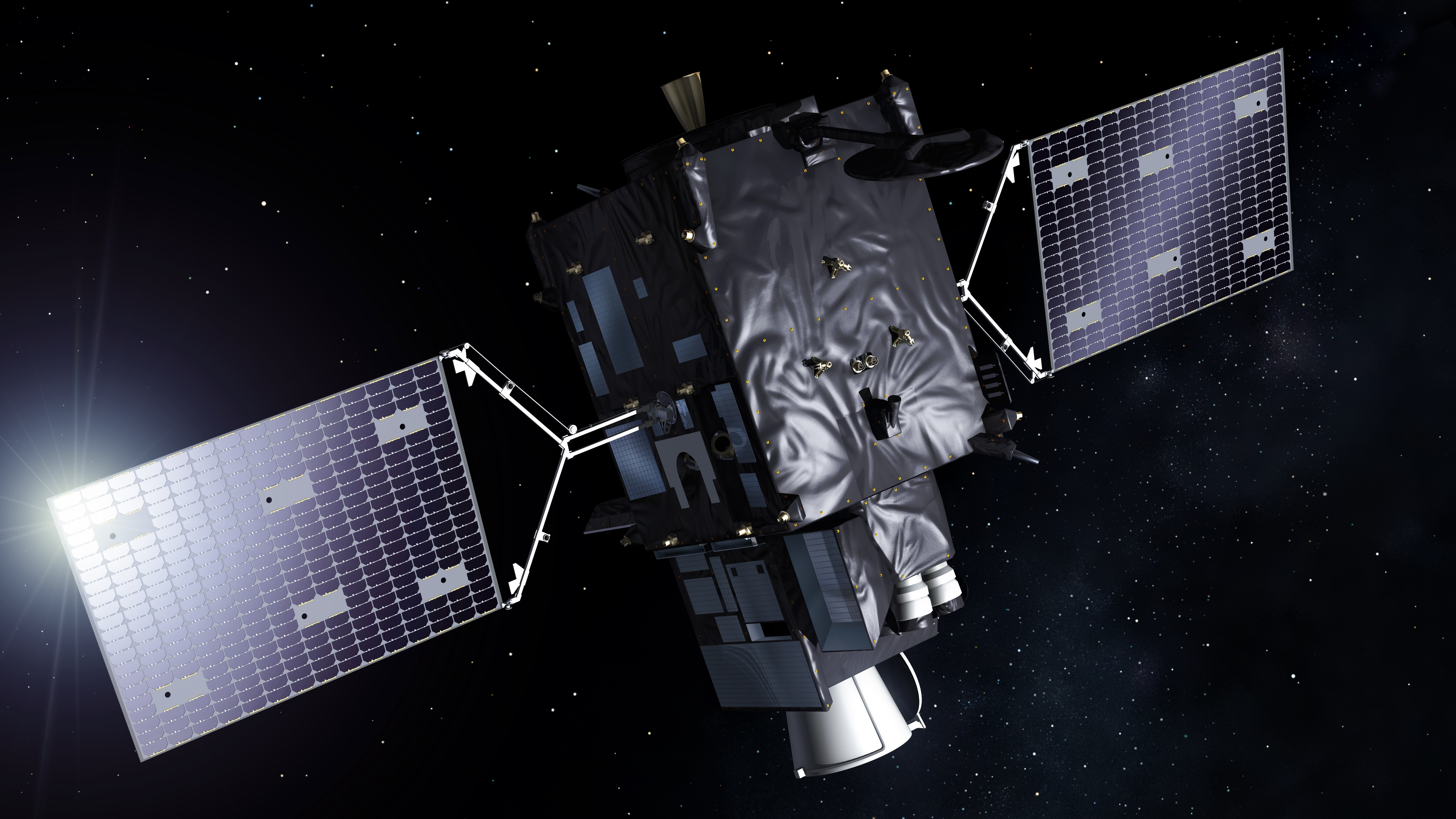

Artistic Representation of MTG-I spacecraft

== Gallery: results ==

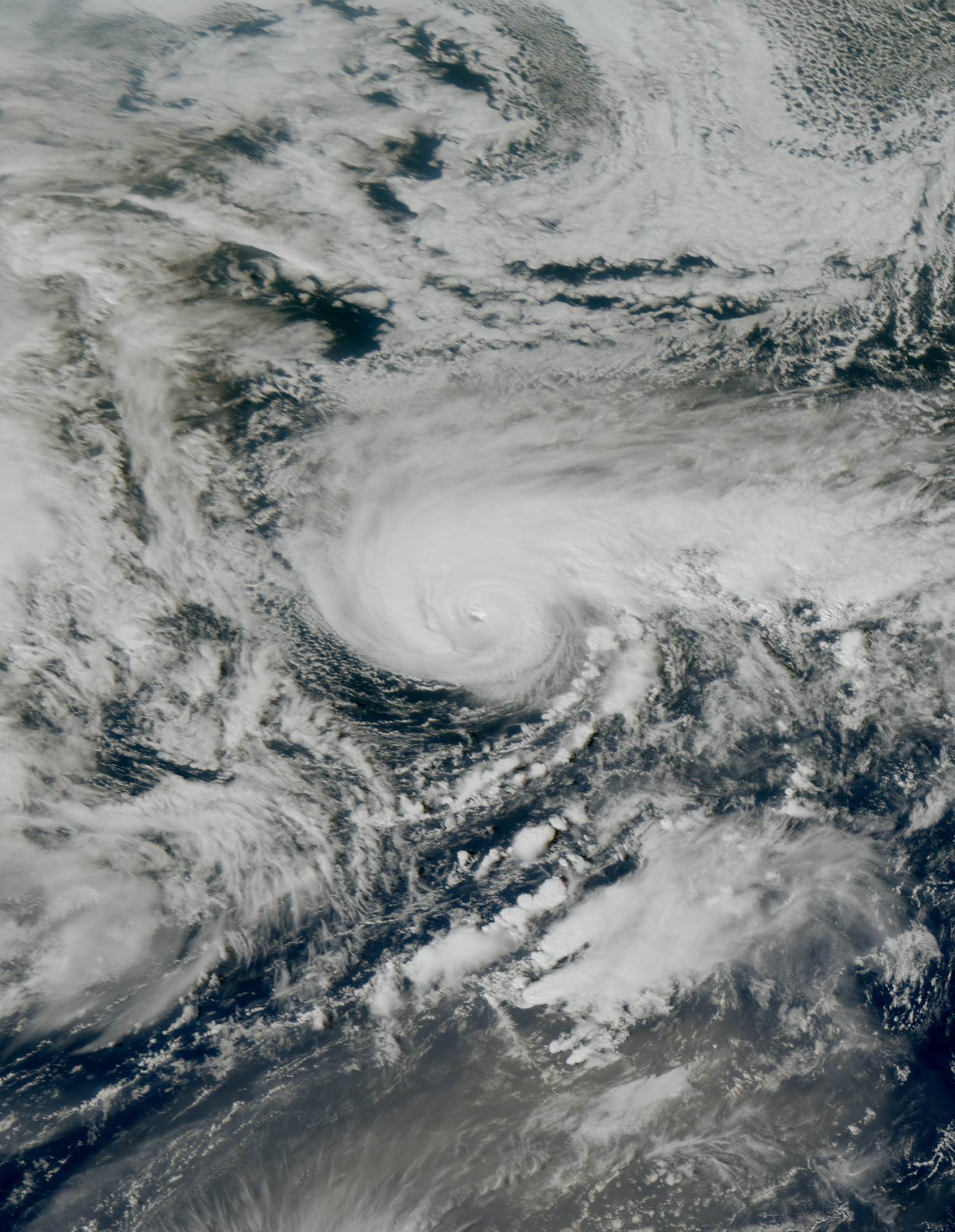

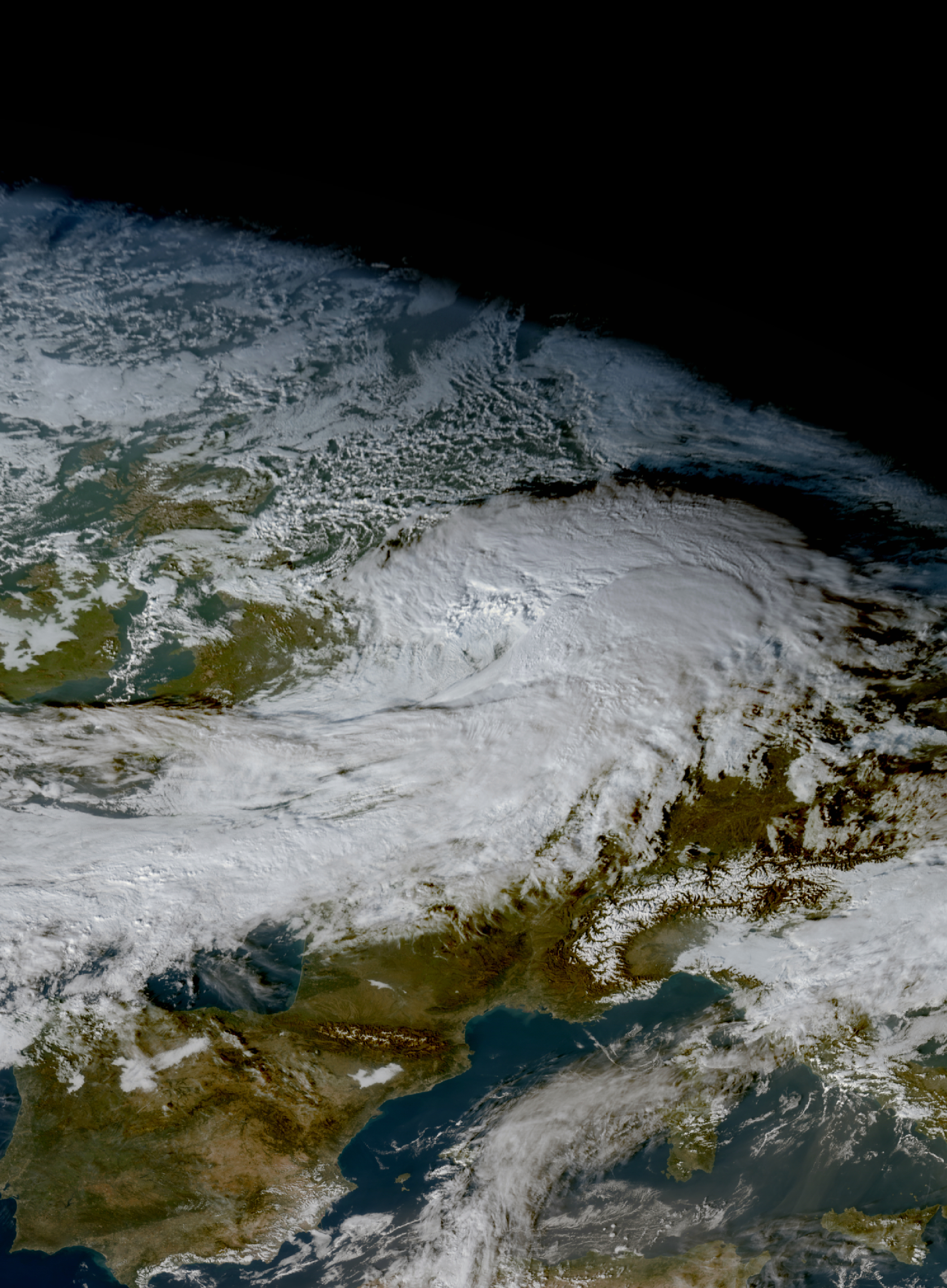

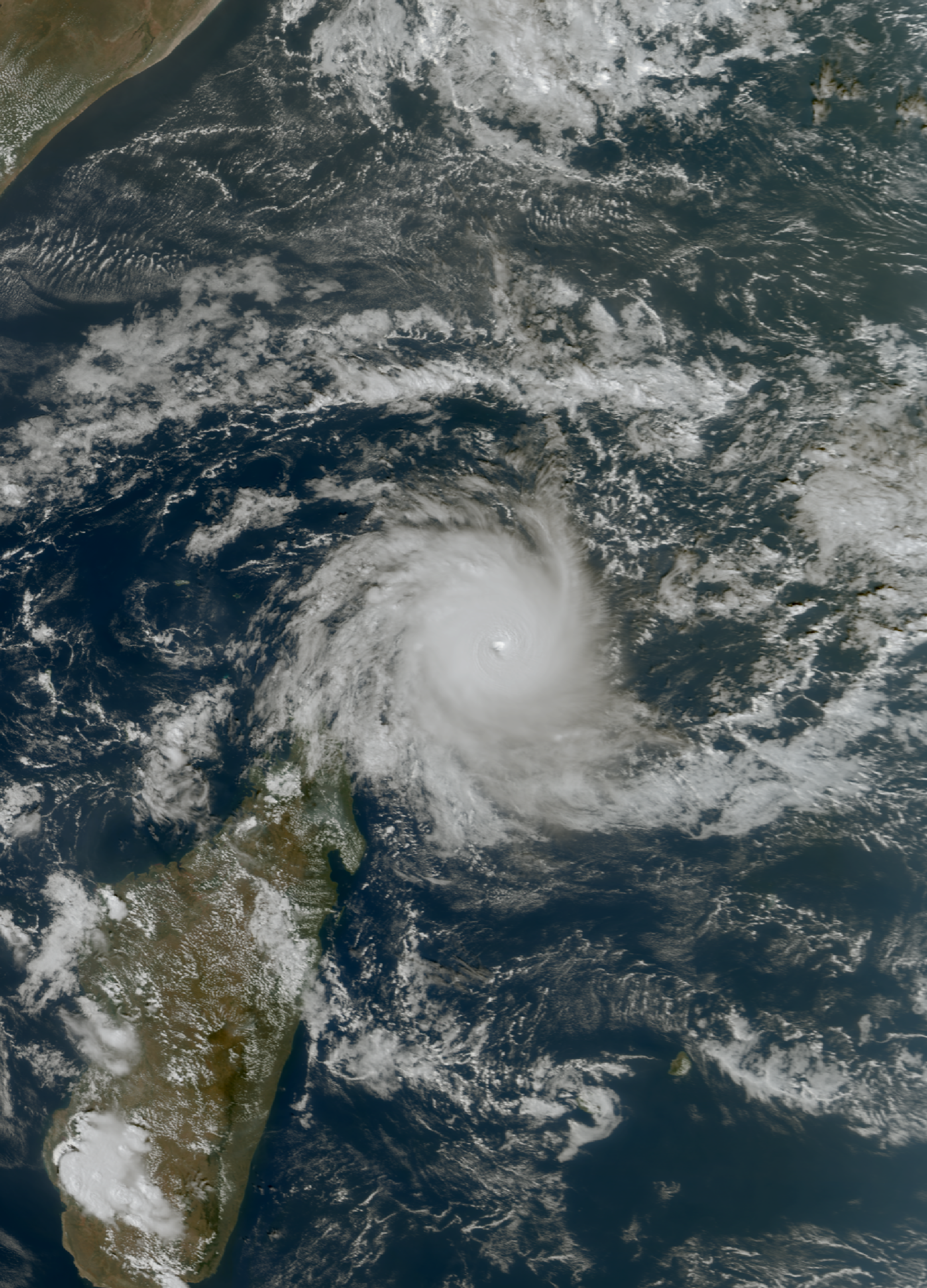

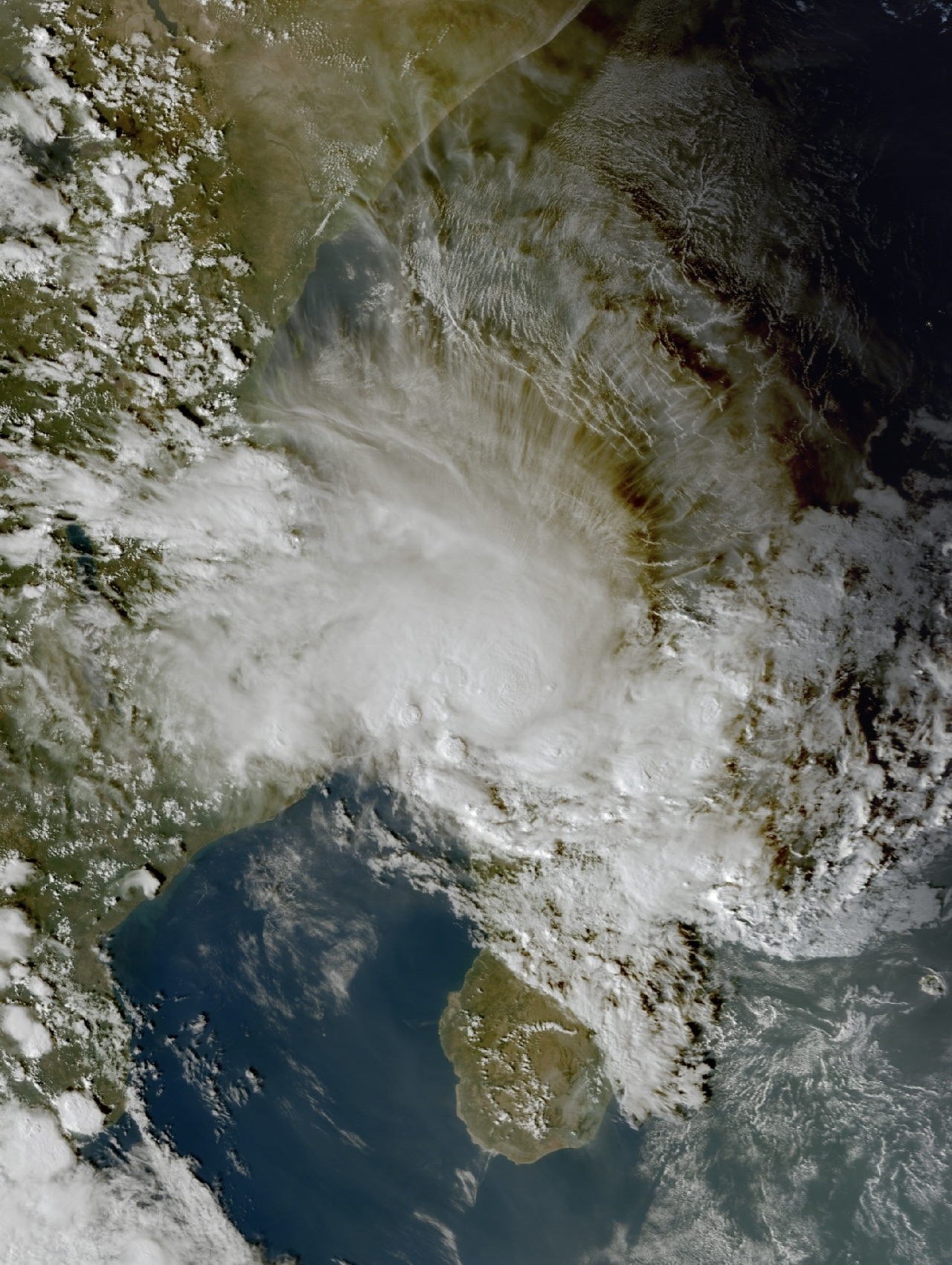

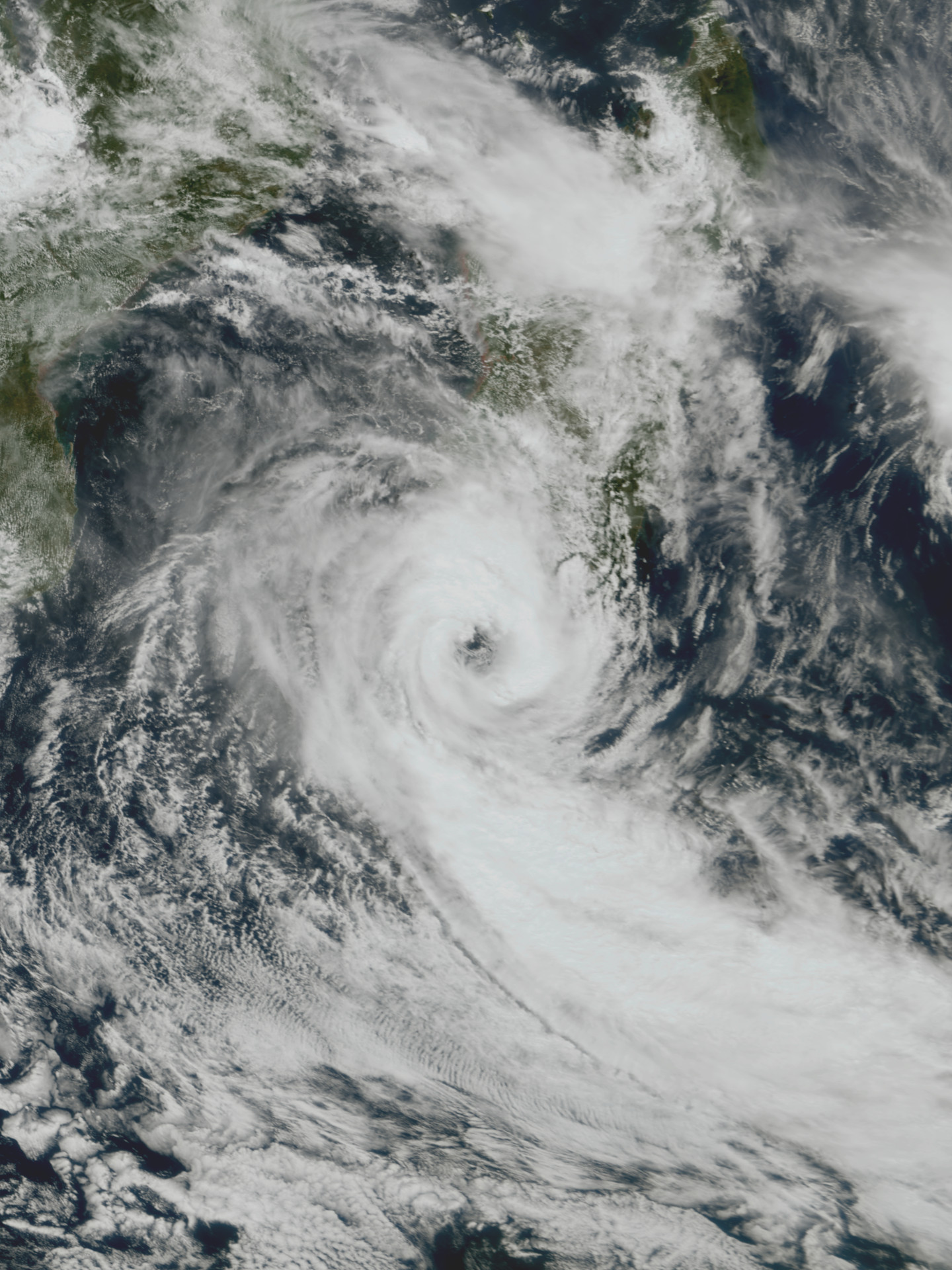

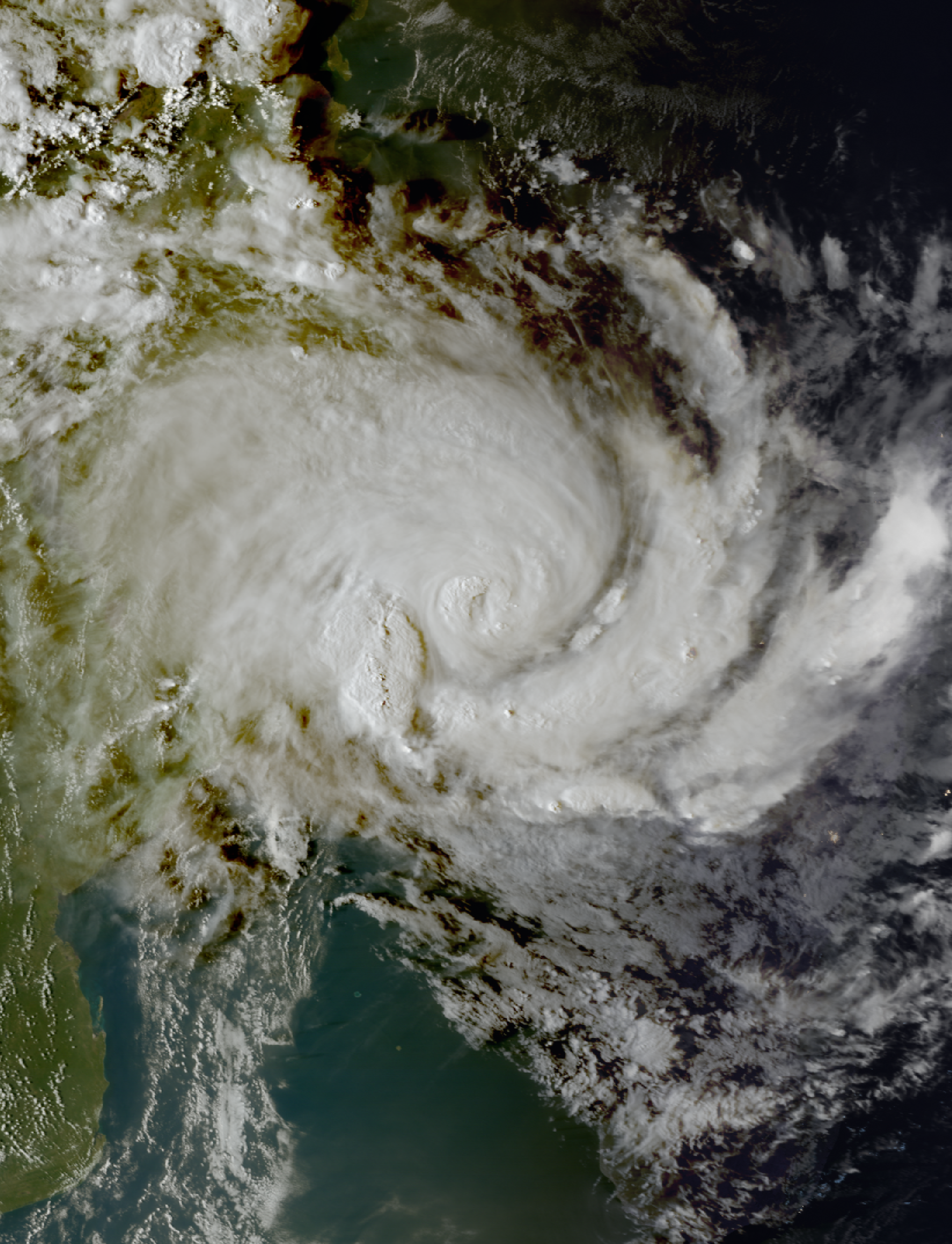

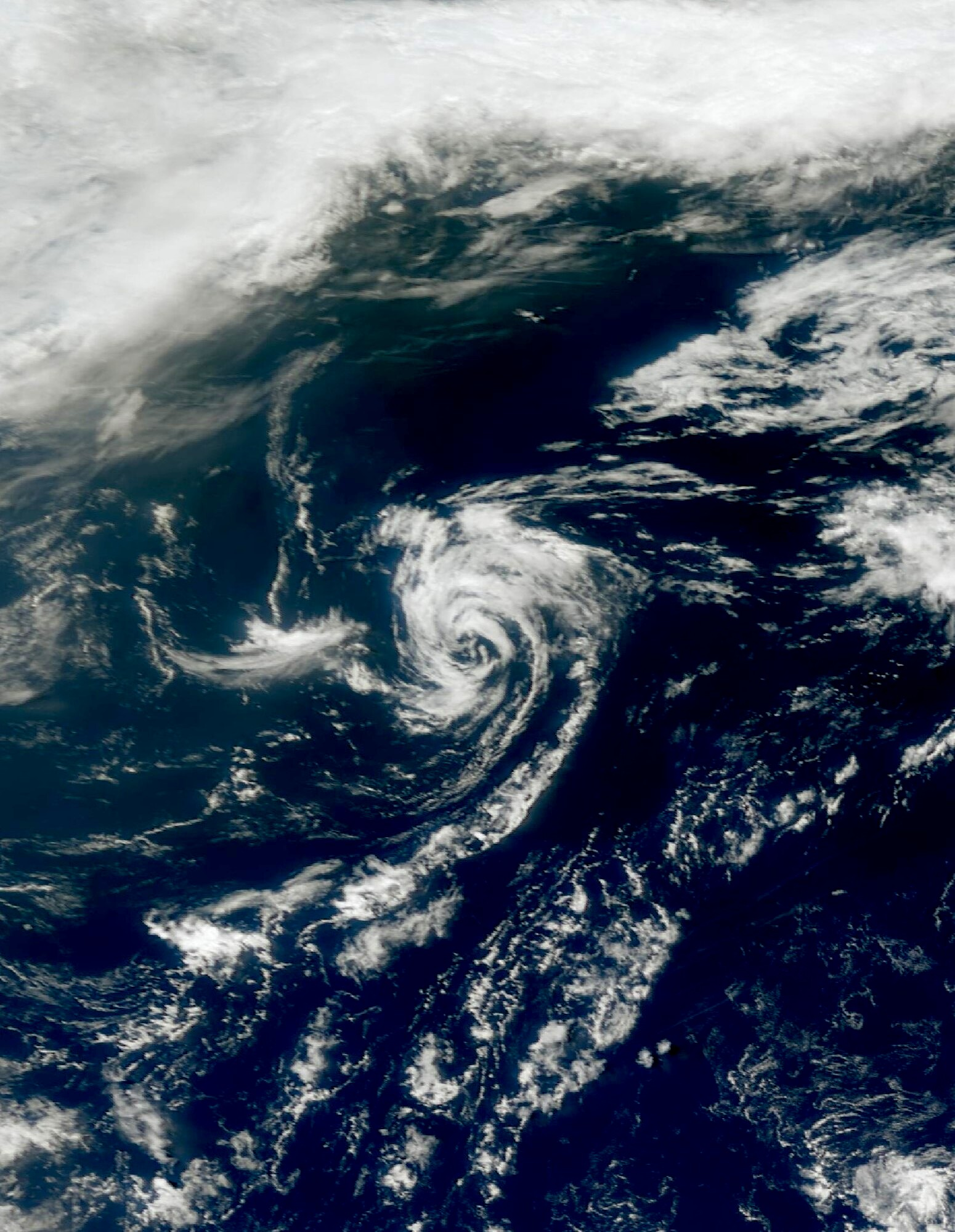

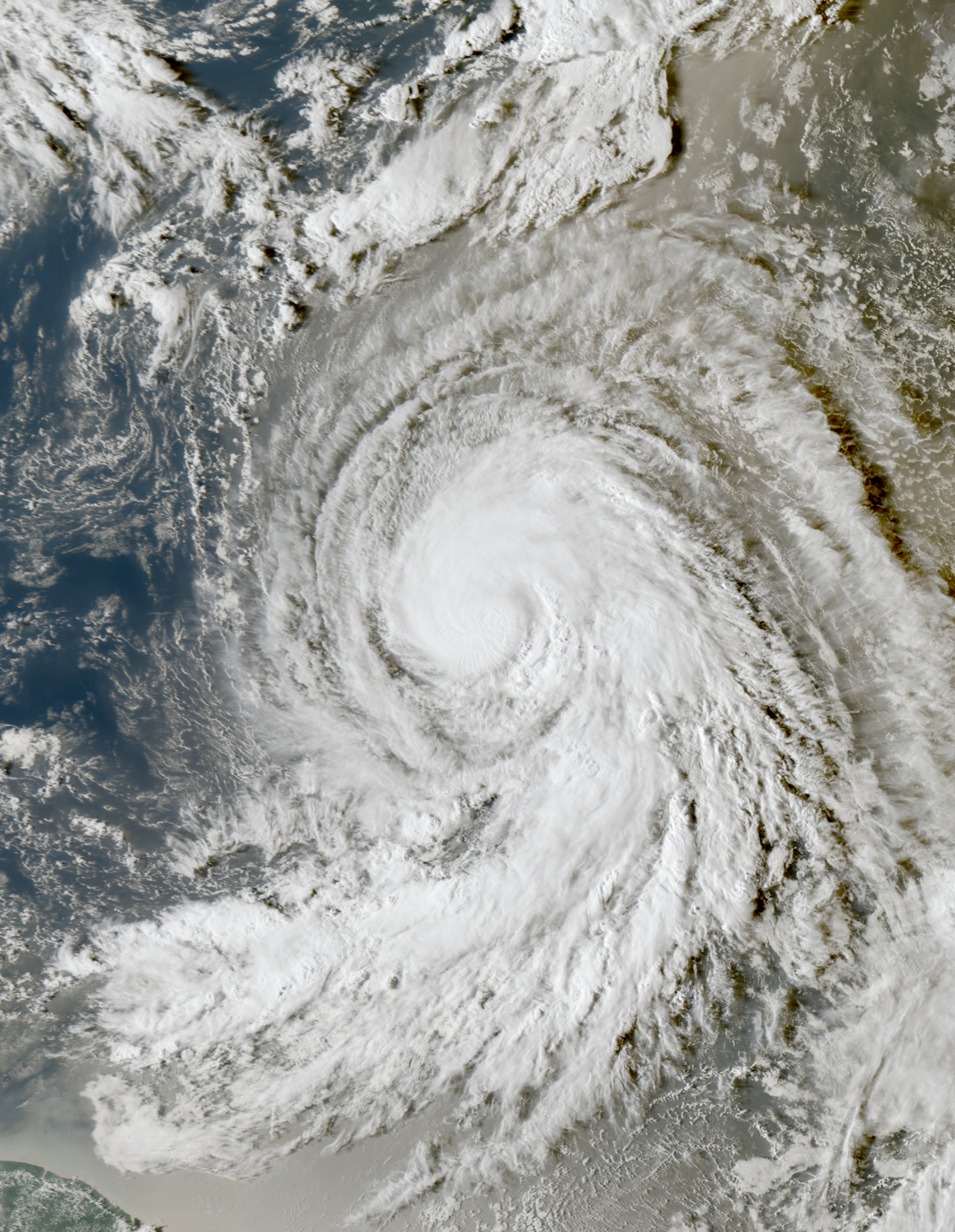

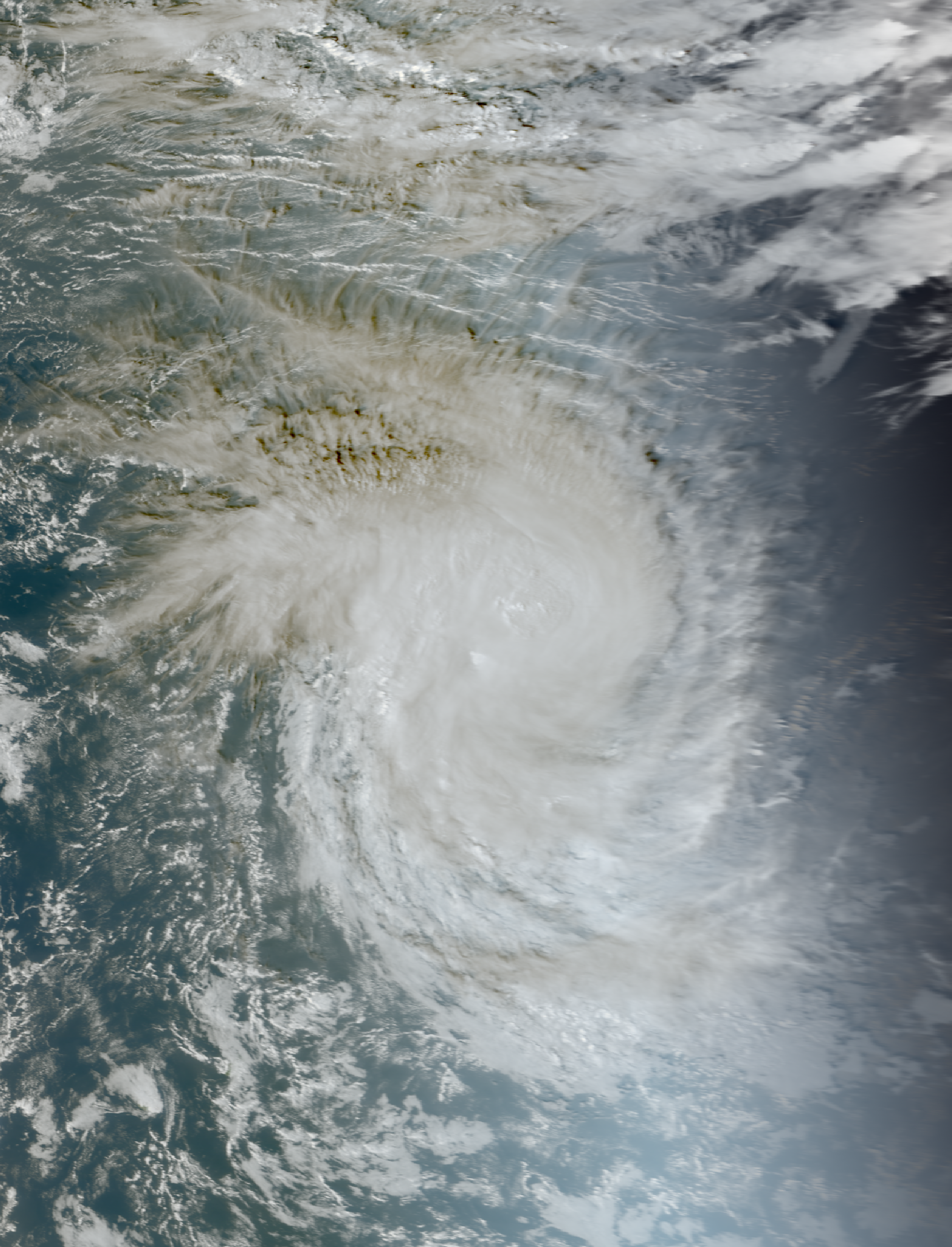

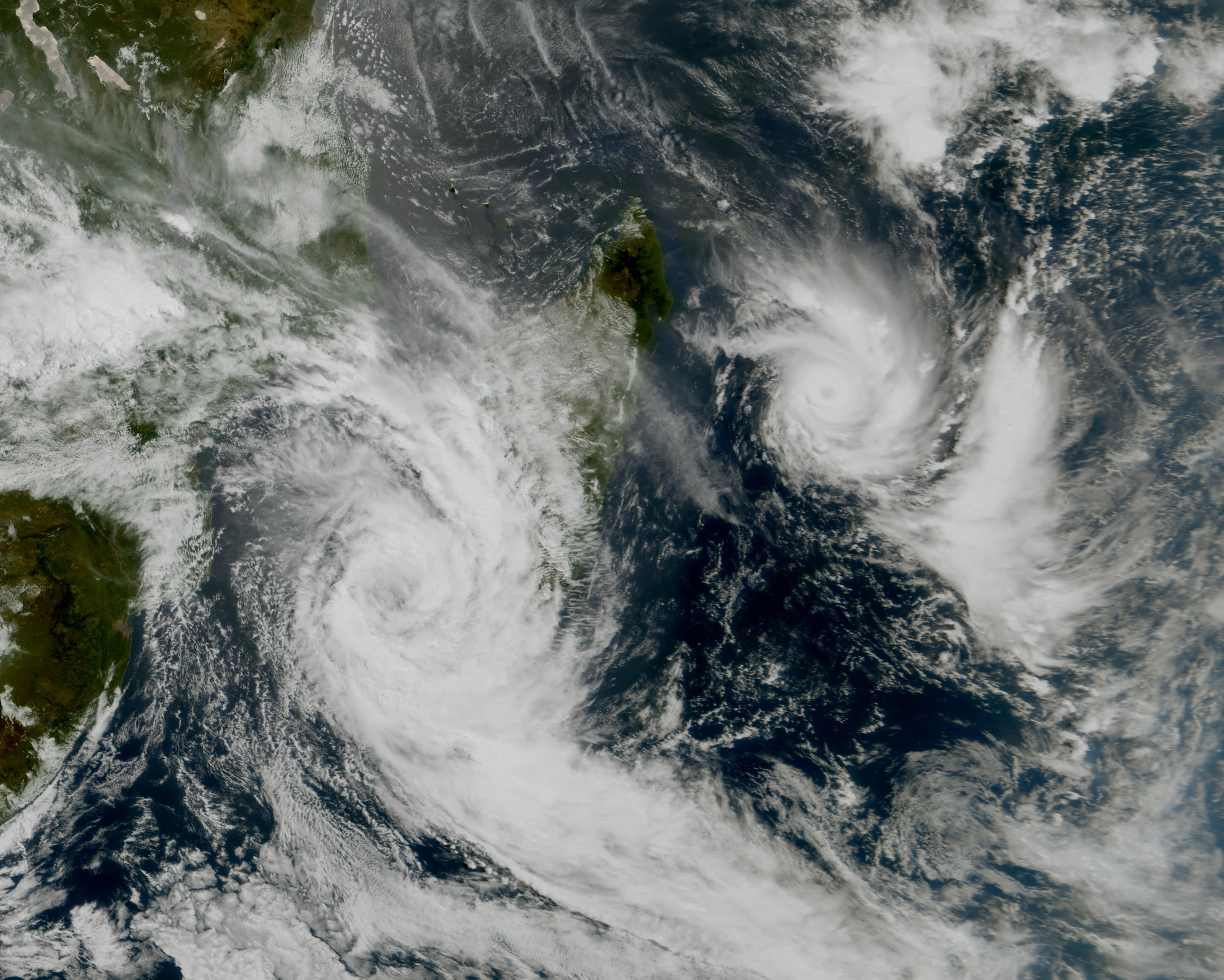

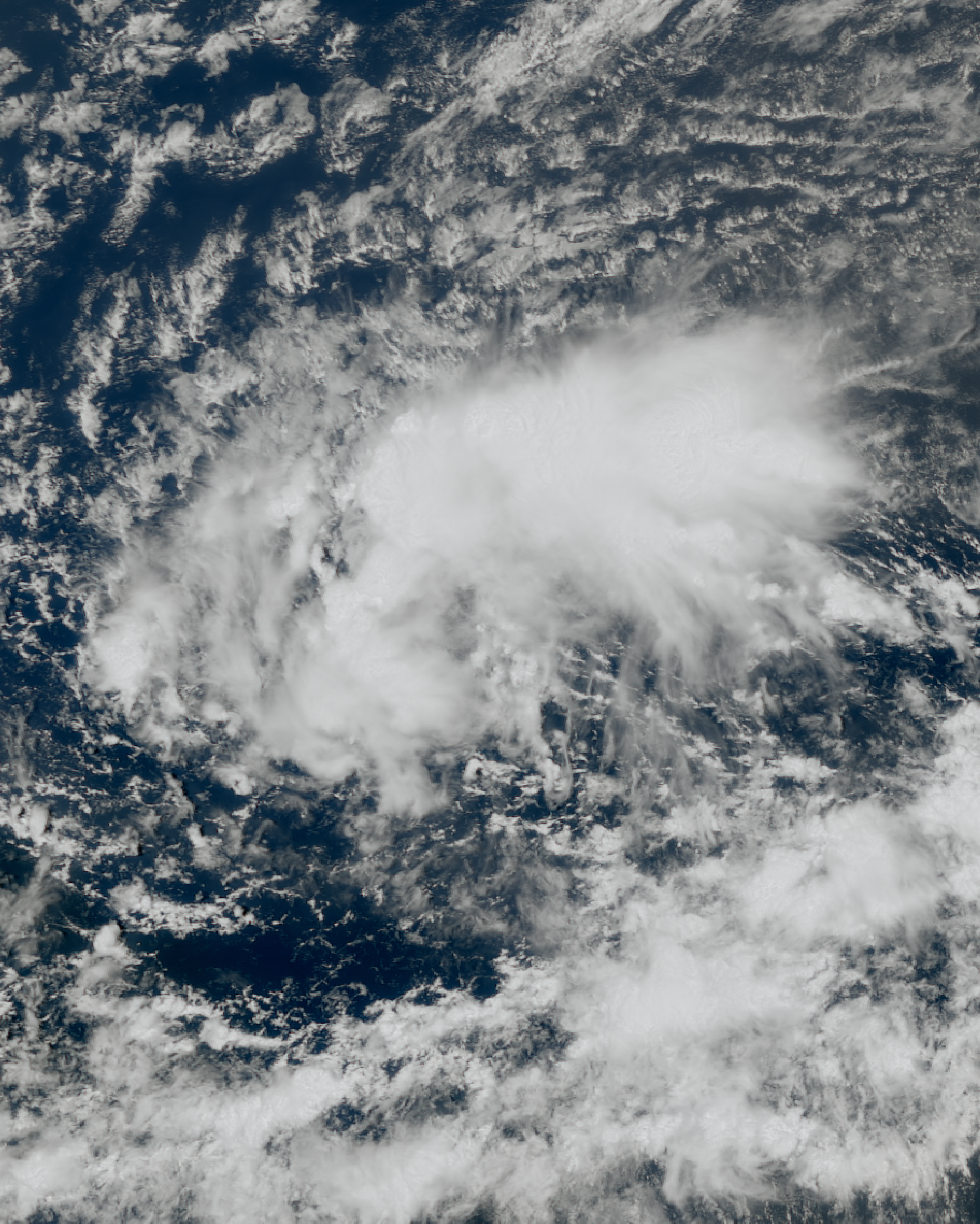

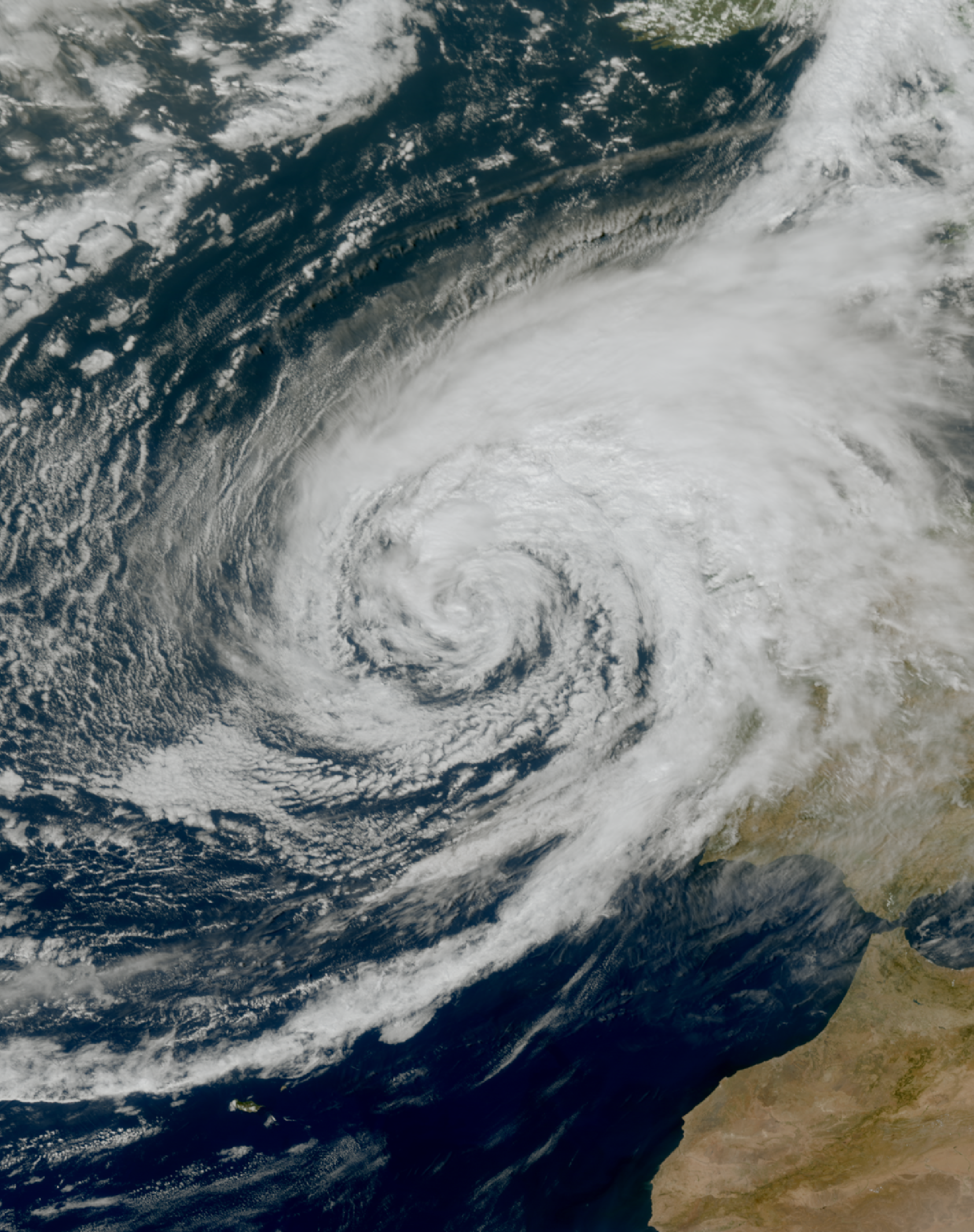

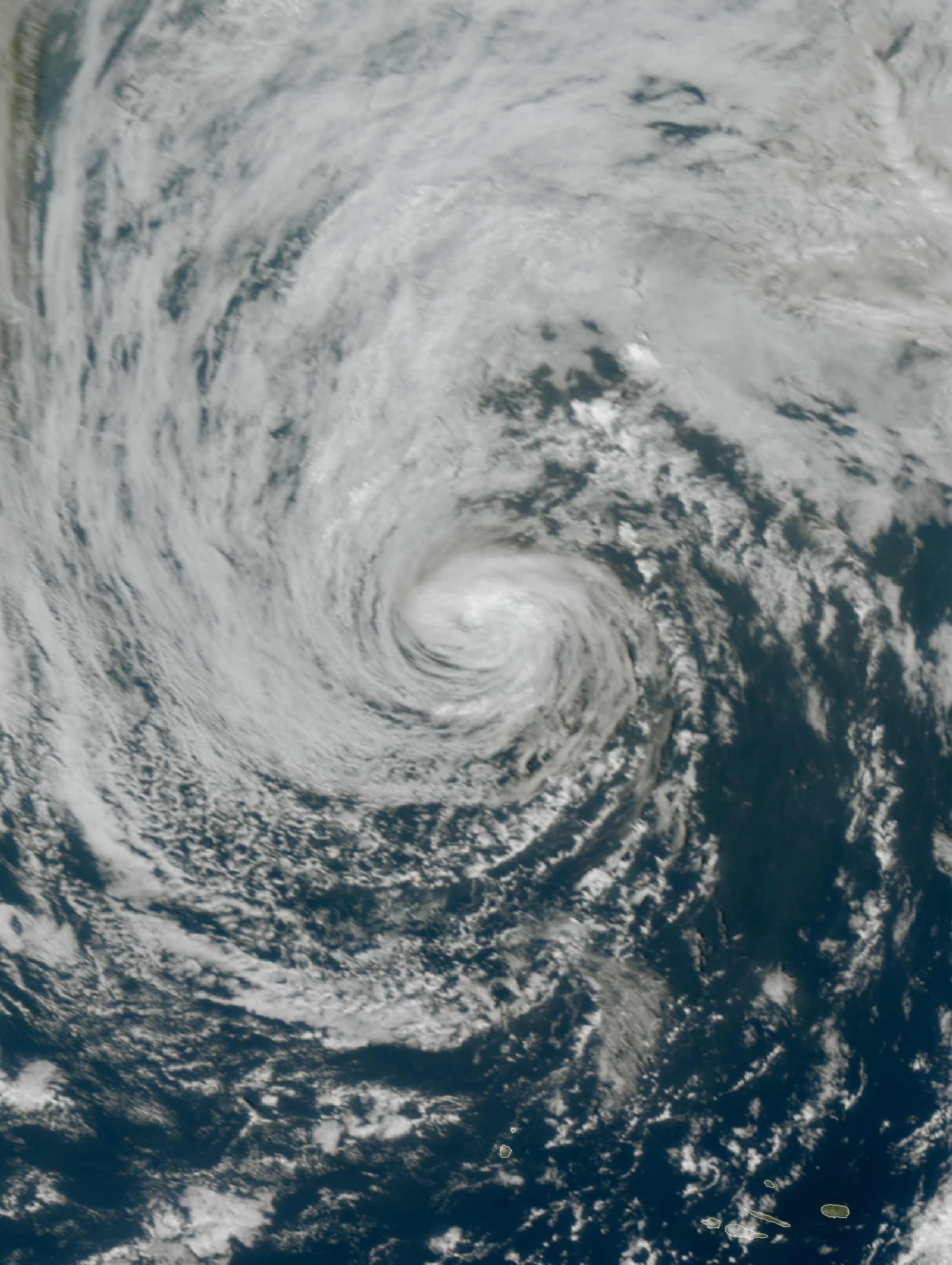

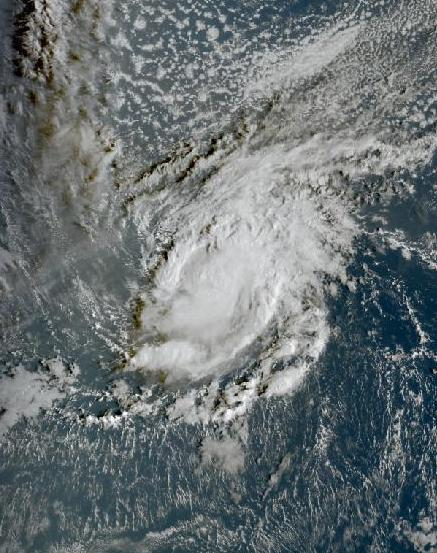

== See also ==
- 2022 in spaceflight
- List of European Space Agency programmes and missions
