= Meteosat 8 =

European weather satellite (2002–2022)

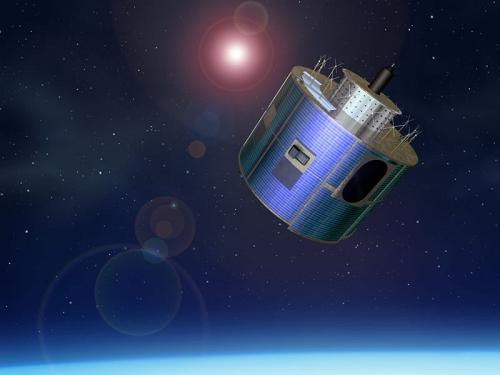
- Artist's view of a Second Generation Meteosat (MSG)
- Mission type: Weather satellite
- Operator: EUMETSAT (ESA for LEOP)
- COSPAR ID: 2002-040B
- SATCAT no.: 27509
- Mission duration: ≥ 14 years

Spacecraft properties
- Spacecraft type: MSG
- Manufacturer: Alcatel Space
- Launch mass: 2,040 kilograms (4,500 lb)
- Power: 600 watts

Start of mission
- Launch date: 28 August 2002, 22:45:00 UTC
- Rocket: Ariane 5G V155
- Launch site: Kourou ELA-3
- Contractor: Arianespace

End of mission
- Disposal: raised 740km above Geostationary Ring, spin reduced to 20rpm, propulsion systems passivated, electronics deactivated
- Deactivated: October 2022
- Last contact: 13 October 2022

Orbital parameters
- Reference system: Geocentric
- Regime: Geostationary
- Longitude: 3.4° West (2004-2008); 9.5° East (2008-2013); 3.5° East (2013-2016); 41.5° East (2016-2022)
- Period: 24 hours

Instruments
- DCS (Data Collection Service); GEOSAR (Geostationary Search and Rescue); GERB (Geostationary Earth Radiation Budget); SEVIRI (Spinning Enhanced Visible Infra-Red Imager)

Meteosat 8 was a weather satellite, also known as MSG 1. The Meteosat series are operated by EUMETSAT under the Meteosat Transition Programme (MTP) and the Meteosat Second Generation (MSG) program. Notable for imaging the first meteor to be predicted to strike the Earth, 2008 TC3. Launched 28 Aug 2002 by an Ariane V155, this European Meteorology satellite is in a Geostationary orbit.

While Meteosat 8 meteorological instruments are working, solid state power amplifier SSPA-C failed in October 2002.

On 22 May 2007, the satellite experienced an unexpected orbit change. This was initially assessed as due to a hit by an unknown object, but that was later assessed not to be credible. The thermal protection was damaged at the same time as the orbit change. Subsequent investigation assessed the Meteosat-8 spinning spacecraft's orbit change due to the mass release of thermal covering whose attachment failed. Meteosat-8 is still operating, and as of April 2013 is providing a backup capability to the Meteosat-10 primary 0-degree Full Earth Scan Service and also a backup to the Meteosat-9 Rapid Scan Service over Europe.

In May 2012 Meteosat-8 switched to operating in an Earth Sensor Mode due to a problem with the Sun sensor data on board. After modifying the ground image processing system the Rapid Scan Service image quality was restored back to nominal.

On 29 June 2016, EUMETSAT approved the proposal of relocating Meteosat-8 to 41.5°E, for the continuation of the Indian Ocean Data Coverage (IODC), replacing Meteosat-7. Meteosat-8 arrived at 41.5°E on 21 September. The distribution of IODC Meteosat-8 data, in parallel to Meteosat-7 data, started on 20 October. On 1 February 2017, Meteosat-8 replaced Meteosat-7 as the official EUMETSAT geostationary satellite for the Indian Ocean.

Meteosat-8 had used up most of its available fuel by 2020, leaving the remaining fuel to be used for safe removal to an altitude 740km above the geostationary ring and slowing the satellite's spin rate. Although not designed to comply with the more recent ISO-24113 guidelines for space debris mitigation, EUMETSAT chose to do so in the case of Meteosat-8 as it had done so the year before for the polar-orbiting Metop-A. Meteosat-8 was finally decommissioned in October 2022 after twenty years in orbit.
