= Cannes Mandelieu Space Center =

Satellite factory in southern France

Thales Alenia Space
- Company type: Private
- Industry: Aerospace
- Founded: 1929
- Headquarters: Cannes
- Key people: Pierre Lipsky, Center Director
- Number of employees: 1,950 (Jan. 2009)
- Parent: Thales Alenia Space
- Website: http://www.thalesonline.com/space/index.html

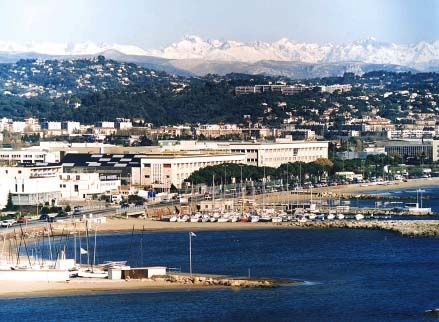
The Cannes Mandelieu Space Center

The Cannes Mandelieu Space Center is an industrial plant dedicated to spacecraft manufacturing, located in both the towns of Cannes and Mandelieu in France. After a long history in aircraft manufacturing, starting in 1929, the center became increasingly involved in aerospace activities after the Second World War, and satellites are now the plant's main product.

After having been the Satellite Division of Aérospatiale, then Alcatel Space in 1998, then Alcatel Alenia Space in 2005, the center is now part, since April 10, 2007, of Thales Alenia Space and the headquarters of the company.

== Main products ==
=== As prime contractor ===
- the series of Meteosat first and second generation
- the series of communication satellites Spacebus
- the series of Globalstar's second-generation satellites
- the series of O3b satellites
- the Infrared Space Observatory
- the Huygens space probe, which landed on Titan
- the Proteus series of small low Earth orbit satellites, including
  - the COROT satellite
  - Jason-1, Jason-2 and Jason-3
  - the CALIPSO satellite
- the Planck spacecraft
- the Herschel Space Observatory
- ISS modules Node 2, Node 3, Cupola, and the MPLM

=== As the main subcontractor ===
- the cameras for the French military observation satellites Helios-1 and Helios-2
- the IASI, Infrared Atmospheric Sounding Interferometer, embarked on-board Metop
- the MERIS camera embarked on board the ENVISAT mission.

== See also ==
- French space program
