= Jason satellite series =

Series of Earth observation satellites

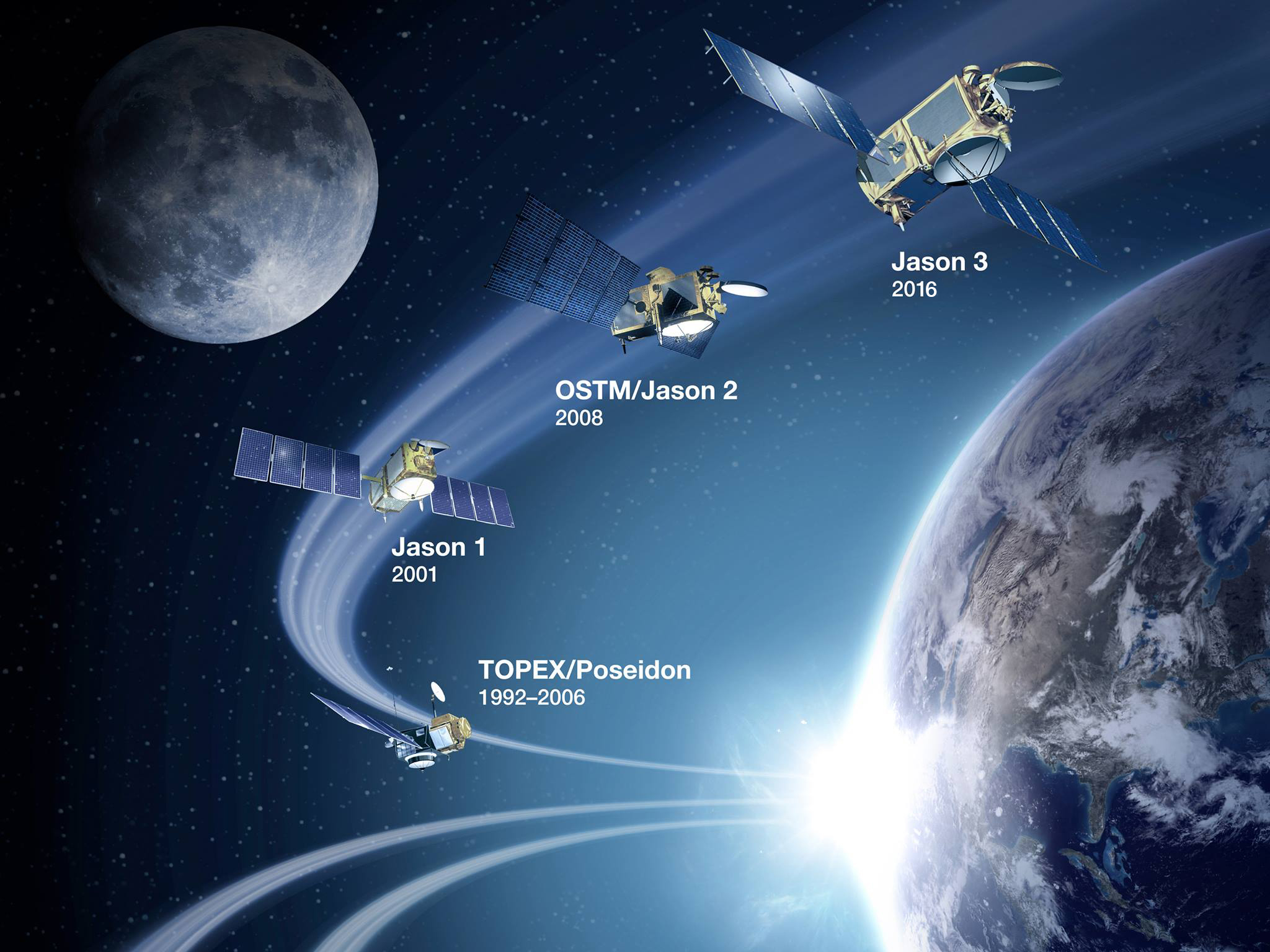
Jason satellites from 1992 to 2016

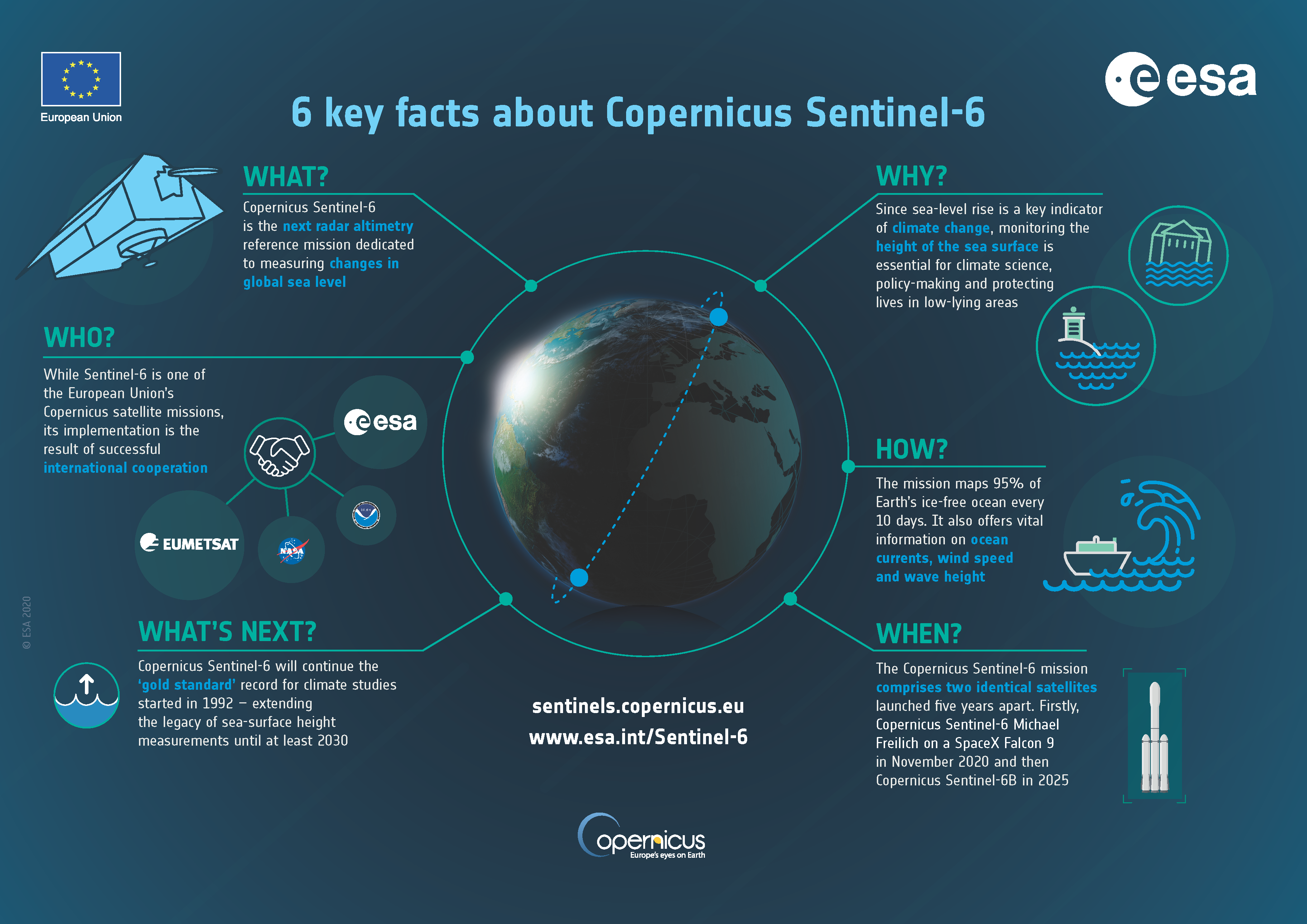
Copernicus Sentinel-6 by ESA

The oceanographic altimeter satellites of the Jason series have been collecting high accuracy measurements of the global ocean's topography since early 1990s, providing a continuous data record of the ocean's response to climate change, especially sea level rise. They also measure topography of inland waters, which is important for understanding droughts and floods. The Jason series satellites have been developed and operated by a broad collaboration of US and European institutions including NASA, CNES, NOAA, EUMETSAT, and ESA. The latest iteration, two identical Jason-CS/Sentinel-6 satellites, is part of the European Union's Copernicus Programme.

== Satellites ==
- TOPEX/Poseidon (1992–2006), predecessor to the Jason satellites
- Jason-1 (2001–2013)
- OSTM/Jason-2 (2008–2019)
- Jason-3, launched in 2016
- Sentinel-6 Michael Freilich (Jason-CS A: Jason Continuity of Service-A), launched in 2020
- Sentinel-6B (Jason-CS B: Jason Continuity of Service-B), launched in November 2025
- Sentinel-6C, expected to launch in 2030s

== See also ==
- Sea state
- SWOT satellite
- List of ESA programmes and missions
- PROBA satellite series
