= Jason-1 =

Satellite oceanography mission

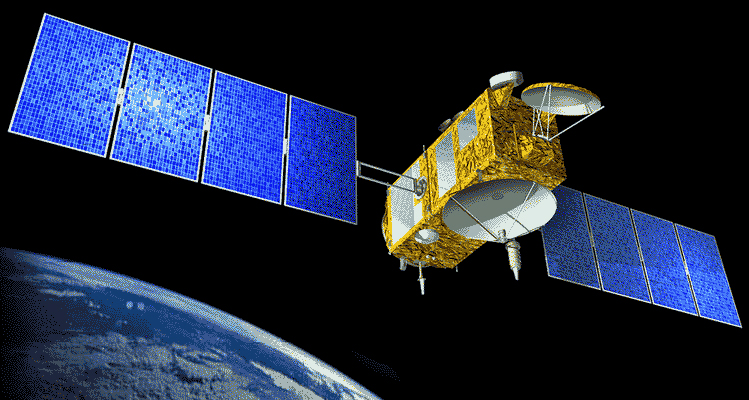
- Artist's interpretation of the Jason-1 satellite
- Mission type: Oceanography mission
- Operator: NASA / CNES
- COSPAR ID: 2001-055A
- SATCAT no.: 26997
- Website: Ocean Surface Topography from Space
- Mission duration: 3 years (planned); 11 1/2 years (achieved)

Spacecraft properties
- Bus: Proteus
- Manufacturer: Thales Alenia Space
- Launch mass: 500 kg (1,100 lb)
- Power: 1000 watts

Start of mission
- Launch date: 7 December 2001, 15:07:00 UTC
- Rocket: Delta II 7920-10
- Launch site: Vandenberg, SLC-2W
- Contractor: Boeing Defense, Space & Security

End of mission
- Deactivated: 1 July 2013

Orbital parameters
- Reference system: Geocentric orbit
- Regime: Low Earth orbit
- Altitude: 1,336 km (830 mi)
- Inclination: 66.0°
- Period: 112.56 minutes

Jason-1 was a satellite altimeter oceanography mission. It sought to monitor global ocean circulation, study the ties between the ocean and the atmosphere, improve global climate forecasts and predictions, and monitor events such as El Niño and ocean eddies. Jason-1 was launched in 2001 and it was followed by OSTM/Jason-2 in 2008, and Jason-3 in 2016 – the Jason satellite series. Jason-1 was launched alongside the TIMED spacecraft.

== Naming ==
The lineage of the name begins with the JASO1 meeting (JASO=Journées Altimétriques Satellitaires pour l'Océanographie) in Toulouse, France to study the problems of assimilating altimeter data in models. Jason as an acronym also stands for "Joint Altimetry Satellite Oceanography Network". Additionally, it is used to reference the mythical quest for knowledge of Jason and the Argonauts.

== History ==
Jason-1 is the successor to the TOPEX/Poseidon mission, which measured ocean surface topography from 1992 through 2005. Like its predecessor, Jason-1 is a joint project between the NASA (United States) and CNES (France) space agencies. Jason-1's successor, the Ocean Surface Topography Mission on the Jason-2 satellite, was launched in June 2008. These satellites provide a unique global view of the oceans that is impossible to acquire using traditional ship-based sampling.

Jason-1 was built by Thales Alenia Space using a Proteus platform, under a contract from CNES, as well as the main Jason-1 instrument, the Poseidon-2 altimeter (successor to the Poseidon altimeter on-board TOPEX/Poseidon).

Jason-1 was designed to measure climate change through very precise millimeter-per-year measurements of global sea level changes. As did TOPEX/Poseidon, Jason-1 uses an altimeter to measure the hills and valleys of the ocean's surface. These measurements of sea surface topography allow scientists to calculate the speed and direction of ocean currents and monitor global ocean circulation. The global ocean is Earth's primary storehouse of solar energy. Jason-1's measurements of sea surface height reveal where this heat is stored, how it moves around Earth by ocean currents, and how these processes affect weather and climate.

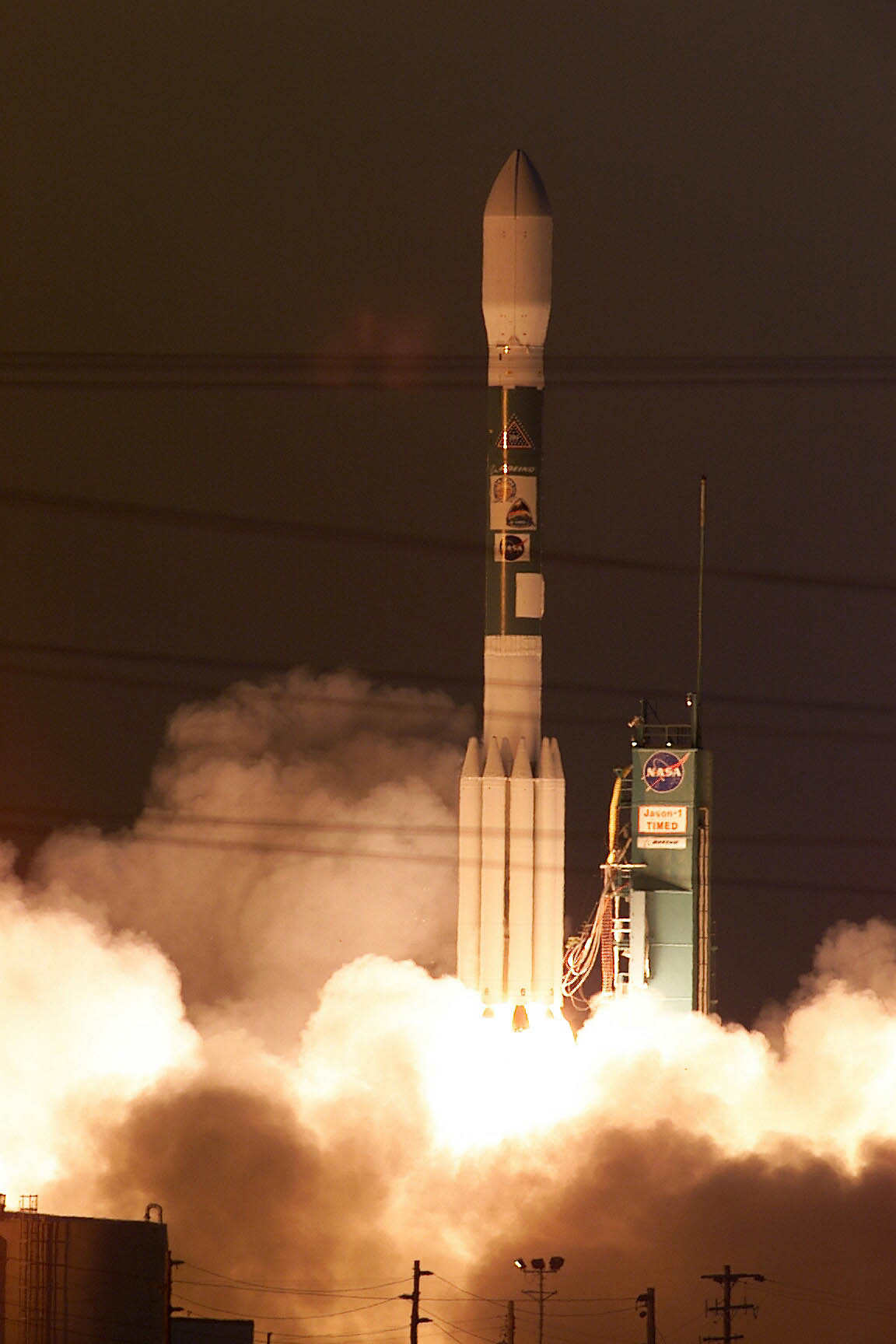
A Boeing Delta II rocket carrying the Jason 1 and Timed satellites from Space Launch Complex-2 on Dec. 7.

Jason-1 was launched on 7 December 2001 from Vandenberg Air Force Base, in California, aboard a Delta II Launch vehicle. During the first months Jason-1 shared an almost identical orbit to TOPEX/Poseidon, which allowed for cross calibration. At the end of this period, the older satellite was moved to a new orbit midway between each Jason ground track. Jason had a repeat cycle of 10 days.

On 16 March 2002, Jason-1 experienced a sudden attitude upset, accompanied by temporary fluctuations in the onboard electrical systems. Soon after this incident, two new small pieces of space debris were observed in orbits slightly lower than Jason-1's, and spectroscopic analysis eventually proved them to have originated from Jason-1. In 2011, it was determined that the pieces of debris had most likely been ejected from Jason-1 by an unidentified, small "high-speed particle" hitting one of the spacecraft's solar panels.

Orbit maneuvers in 2009 put the Jason-1 satellite on the opposite side of Earth from the OSTM/Jason-2 satellite, which is operated by the United States and French weather agencies. At that time, Jason-1 flew over the same region of the ocean that OSTM/Jason-2 flew over five days earlier. Its ground tracks fell midway between those of OSTM/Jason-2, which are about 315 km (196 mi) apart at the equator.

This interleaved tandem mission provided twice the number of measurements of the ocean's surface, bringing smaller features such as ocean eddies into view. The tandem mission also helped pave the way for a future ocean altimeter mission that would collect much more detailed data with its single instrument than the two Jason satellites now do together.

In early 2012, having helped cross-calibrate the OSTM/Jason-2 replacement mission, Jason-1 was maneuvered into its graveyard orbit and all remaining fuel was vented. The mission was still able to return science data, measuring Earth's gravity field over the ocean. On 21 June 2013, contact with Jason-1 was lost; multiple attempts to re-establish communication failed. It was determined that the last remaining transmitter on board the spacecraft had failed. Operators sent commands to the satellite to turn off remaining functioning components on 1 July 2013, rendering it decommissioned. It is estimated that the spacecraft will remain on orbit for at least 1,000 years.

The program is named after the Greek mythological hero Jason.

== Satellite instruments ==
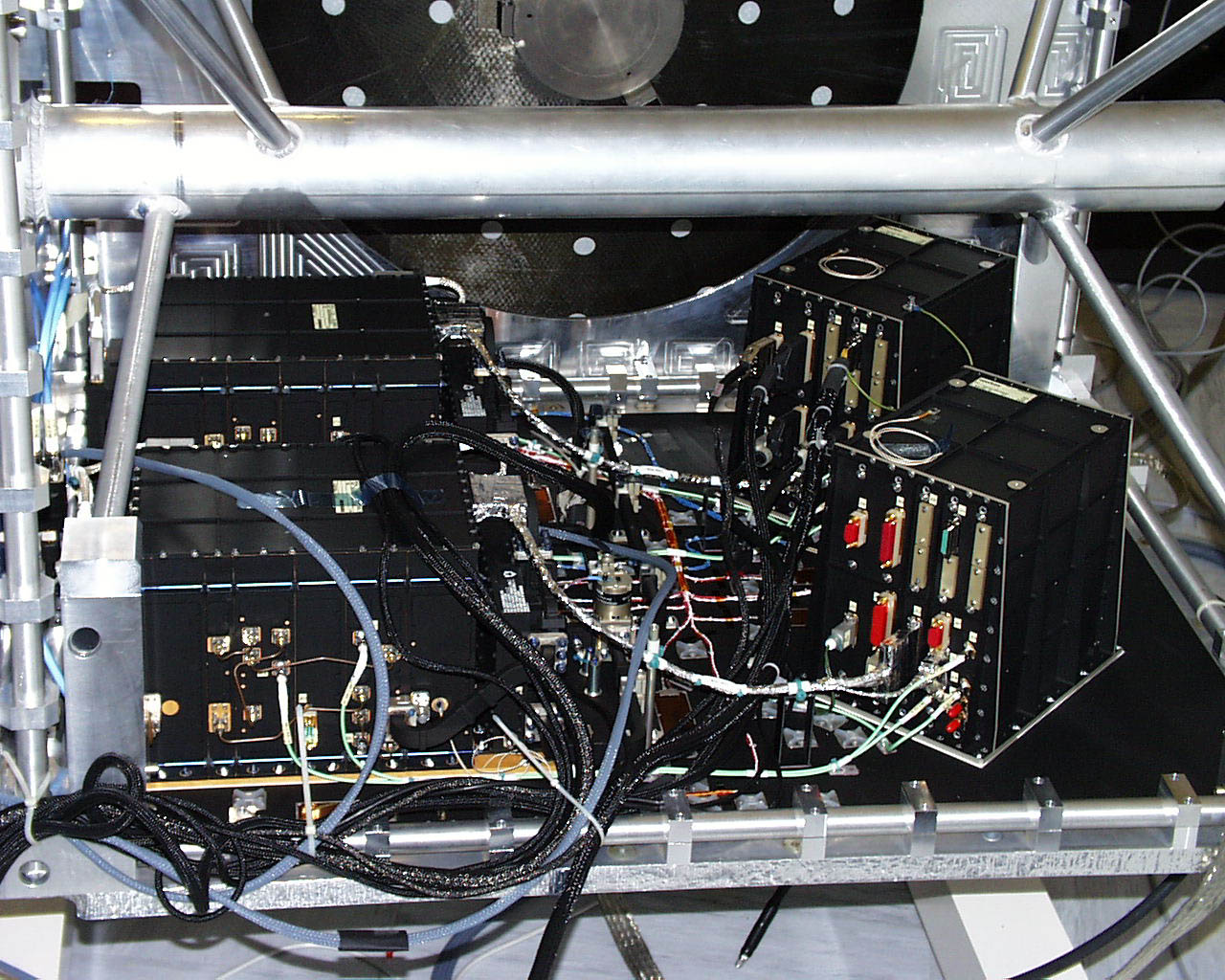
Poseidon radar altimeter

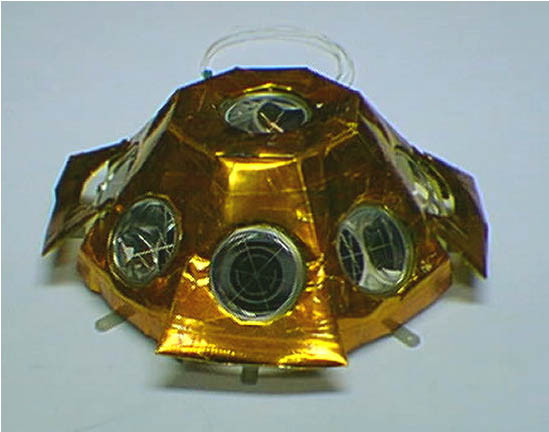
Laser retroreflector

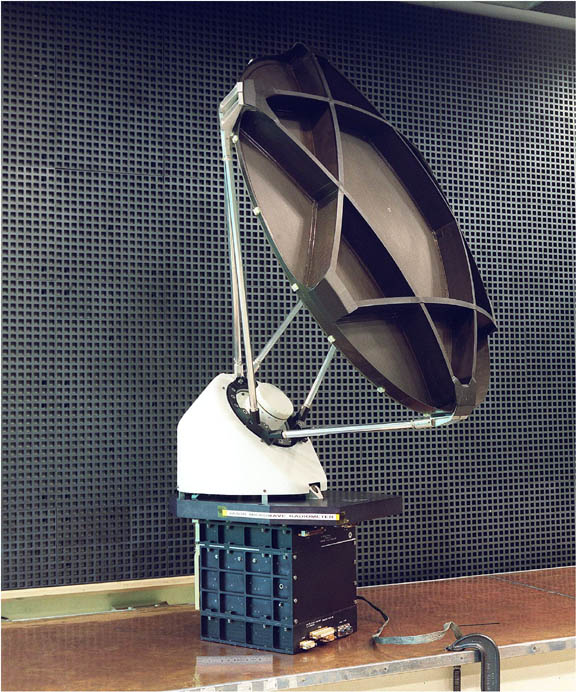
Microwave Radiometer (JMR)

Jason-1 has 5 instruments:

- Poseidon 2 – Nadir pointing Radar altimeter using C band and K_{u} band for measuring height above sea surface.
- Jason Microwave Radiometer (JMR) – measures water vapor along altimeter path to correct for pulse delay
- DORIS (Doppler Orbitography and Radiopositioning Integrated by Satellite) for orbit determination to within 10 cm or less and ionospheric correction data for Poseidon 2.
- BlackJack Global Positioning System receiver provides precise orbit ephemeris data
- Laser retroreflector array works with ground stations to track the satellite and calibrate and verify altimeter measurements.

The Jason-1 satellite, its altimeter instrument and a position-tracking antenna were built in France. The radiometer, Global Positioning System receiver and laser retroreflector array were built in the United States.

== Use of information ==
TOPEX/Poseidon and Jason-1 have led to major advances in the science of physical oceanography and in climate studies. Their 15-year data record of ocean surface topography has provided the first opportunity to observe and understand the global change of ocean circulation and sea level. The results have improved the understanding of the role of the ocean in climate change and improved weather and climate predictions. Data from these missions are used to improve ocean models, forecast hurricane intensity, and identify and track large ocean/atmosphere phenomena such as El Niño and La Niña. The data are also used every day in applications as diverse as routing ships, improving the safety and efficiency of offshore industry operations, managing fisheries, and tracking marine mammals.

TOPEX/Poseidon and Jason-1 have made major contributions to the understanding of:

=== Ocean variability ===
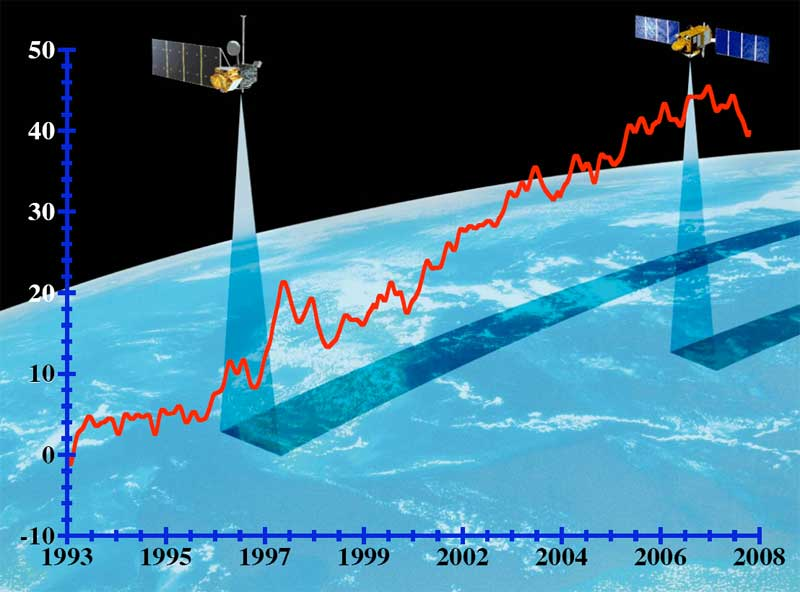
Although the 1993–2005 Topex/Poseidon satellite (on the left) measured an average annual Global Mean Sea Level rise of 3.1 mm/year, Jason-1 is measuring only 2.3 mm/year GMSL rise, and the Envisat satellite (2002–2012) is measuring just 0.5 mm/year GMSL rise. In this graph, the vertical scale represents globally averaged mean sea level. Seasonal variations in sea level have been removed to show the underlying trend. (Image credit: University of Colorado)

The missions revealed the surprising variability of the ocean, how much it changes from season to season, year to year, decade to decade and on even longer time scales. They ended the traditional notion of a quasi-steady, large-scale pattern of global ocean circulation by proving that the ocean is changing rapidly on all scales, from huge features such as El Niño and La Niña, which can cover the entire equatorial Pacific, to tiny eddies swirling off the large Gulf Stream in the Atlantic.

=== Sea level change ===
Measurements by Jason-1 indicate that mean sea level has been rising at an average rate of 2.28 mm (0.09 inch) per year since 2001. This is somewhat less than the rate measured by the earlier TOPEX/Poseidon mission, but over four times the rate measured by the later Envisat mission. Mean sea level measurements from Jason-1 are continuously graphed at the Centre National d'Études Spatiales web site, on the Aviso page. A composite sea level graph, using data from several satellites, is also available on that site.

The data record from these altimetry missions has given scientists important insights into how global sea level is affected by natural climate variability, as well as by human activities.

=== Planetary Waves ===
TOPEX/Poseidon and Jason-1 made clear the importance of planetary-scale waves, such as Rossby and Kelvin waves. No one had realized how widespread these waves are. Thousands of kilometers wide, these waves are driven by wind under the influence of Earth's rotation and are important mechanisms for transmitting climate signals across the large ocean basins. At high latitudes, they travel twice as fast as scientists believed previously, showing the ocean responds much more quickly to climate changes than was known before these missions.

=== Ocean tides ===
The precise measurements of TOPEX/Poseidon's and Jason-1 have brought knowledge of ocean tides to an unprecedented level. The change of water level due to tidal motion in the deep ocean is known everywhere on the globe to within 2.5 centimeters (1 inch). This new knowledge has revised notions about how tides dissipate. Instead of losing all their energy over shallow seas near the coasts, as previously believed, about one third of tidal energy is actually lost to the deep ocean. There, the energy is consumed by mixing water of different properties, a fundamental mechanism in the physics governing the general circulation of the ocean.

=== Ocean models ===
TOPEX/Poseidon and Jason-1 observations provided the first global data for improving the performance of the numerical ocean models that are a key component of climate prediction models. TOPEX/Poseidon and Jason-1 data are available at the University of Colorado Center for Astrodynamics Research, NASA's Physical Oceanography Distributed Active Archive Center, and the French data archive center AVISO.

== Benefits to society ==
Altimetry data have a wide variety of uses from basic scientific research on climate to ship routing. Applications include:

- Climate Research: altimetry data are incorporated into computer models to understand and predict changes in the distribution of heat in the ocean, a key element of climate.
- El Niño and La Niña Forecasting: understanding the pattern and effects of climate cycles such as El Niño helps predict and mitigate the disastrous effects of floods and drought.
- Hurricane Forecasting: altimeter data and satellite ocean wind data are incorporated into atmospheric models for hurricane season forecasting and individual storm severity.
- Ship Routing: maps of ocean currents, eddies, and vector winds are used in commercial shipping and recreational yachting to optimize routes.
- Offshore Industries: cable-laying vessels and offshore oil operations require accurate knowledge of ocean circulation patterns to minimize impacts from strong currents.
- Marine Mammal Research: sperm whales, fur seals, and other marine mammals can be tracked, and therefore studied, around ocean eddies where nutrients and plankton are abundant.
- Fisheries Management: satellite data identify ocean eddies which bring an increase in organisms that comprise the marine food web, attracting fish and fishermen.
- Coral Reef Research: remotely sensed data are used to monitor and assess coral reef ecosystems, which are sensitive to changes in ocean temperature.
- Marine Debris Tracking: the amount of floating and partially submerged material, including nets, timber and ship debris, is increasing with human population. Altimetry can help locate these hazardous materials.

== See also ==
- Argo - a project to measure the temperature and salinity of the upper 2 km of the water column
- Seasat - an early radar altimeter satellite
- TOPEX/Poseidon - the immediate predecessor to Jason-1
- Ocean Surface Topography Mission/Jason-2 – the immediate successor to Jason-1
- 2004 Indian Ocean earthquake - Energy of the earthquake
- French space program
