= Ocean surface topography =

Shape of the ocean surface relative to the geoid

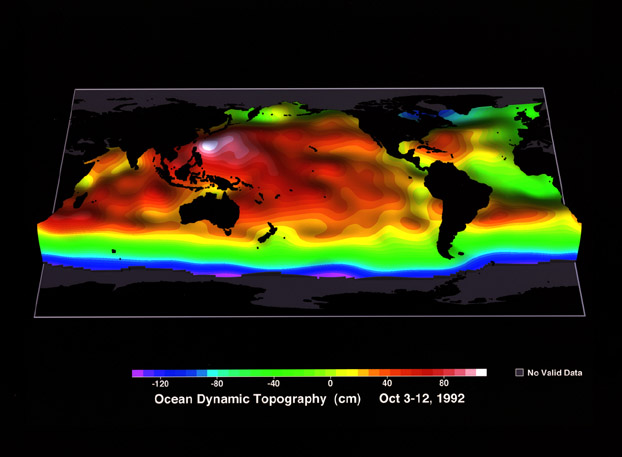
TOPEX/Poseidon was the first space mission that allowed scientists to map ocean topography with sufficient accuracy to study the large-scale current systems of the world's ocean. Although this image was constructed from only 10 days of TOPEX/Poseidon data (October 3 to October 12, 1992), it reveals most of the current systems that have been identified by shipboard observations collected over the last 100 years.

Ocean surface topography or sea surface topography, also called ocean dynamic topography, are highs and lows on the ocean surface, similar to the hills and valleys of Earth's land surface depicted on a topographic map. These variations are expressed in terms of average sea surface height (SSH) relative to Earth's geoid. The main purpose of measuring ocean surface topography is to understand the large-scale ocean circulation.

== Time variations ==
Unaveraged or instantaneous sea surface height (SSH) is most obviously affected by the tidal forces of the Moon and by the seasonal cycle of the Sun acting on Earth. Over timescales longer than a year, the patterns in SSH can be influenced by ocean circulation. Typically, SSH anomalies resulting from these forces differ from the mean by less than ±1 m (3 ft) at the global scale. Other influences include changing interannual patterns of temperature, salinity, waves, tides and winds. Ocean surface topography can be measured with high accuracy and precision at regional to global scale by satellite altimetry (e.g. TOPEX/Poseidon).

Slower and larger variations are due to changes in Earth's gravitational field (geoid) due to melting ice, rearrangement of continents, formation of sea mounts and other redistribution of rock. The combination of satellite gravimetry (e.g. GRACE and GRACE-FO) with altimetry can be used to determine sea level rise and properties such as ocean heat content.

== Applications ==
Ocean surface topography is used to map ocean currents, which move around the ocean's "hills" and "valleys" in predictable ways. A clockwise sense of rotation is found around "hills" in the northern hemisphere and "valleys" in the southern hemisphere. This is because of the Coriolis effect. Conversely, a counterclockwise sense of rotation is found around "valleys" in the northern hemisphere and "hills" in the southern hemisphere.

Ocean surface topography is also used to understand how the ocean moves heat around the globe, a critical component of Earth's climate, and for monitoring changes in global sea level. The collection of the data is useful for the long-term information about the ocean and its currents. According to NASA science this data can also be used to provide understanding of weather, climate, navigation, fisheries management, and offshore operations. Observations made about the data are used to study the oceans tides, circulation, and the amount of heat the ocean contains. These observations can help predict short and long term effects of the weather and the earth's climate over time.

== Measurement ==
The sea surface height (SSH) is calculated through altimetry satellites using as a reference surface the ellipsoid, which determine the distance from the satellite to a target surface by measuring the satellite-to-surface round-trip time of a radar pulse. The satellites then measure the distance between their orbit altitude and the surface of the water. Due to the differing depths of the ocean, an approximation is made. This enables data to be taken precisely due to the uniform surface level. The satellite's altitude then has to be calculated with respect to the reference ellipsoid. It is calculated using the orbital parameters of the satellite and various positioning instruments. However, the ellipsoid is not an equipotential surface of the Earth's gravity field, so the measurements must be referenced to a surface that represents the water flow, in this case the geoid. The transformations between geometric heights (ellipsoid) and orthometric heights (geoid) are performed from a geoidal model. The sea surface height is then the difference between the satellite's altitude relative to the reference ellipsoid and the altimeter range. The satellite sends microwave pulses to the ocean surface. The travel time of the pulses ascending to the oceans surface and back provides data of the sea surface height. In the image below you can see the measurement system using by the satellite Jason-1.

| Depth Range (meters) | Seafloor Area (km²) | Seafloor Percentage |
|---|---|---|
| 0 – 200 | 26,402,000 | 7.30% |
| 201 – 1000 | 15,848,000 | 4.38% |
| 1001 – 4000 | 127,423,000 | 35.22% |
| 4001 – 6000 | 188,395,000 | 52.08% |
| 6001 – 7000 | 3,207,000 | 0.89% |
| 7001 – 8000 | 320,000 | 0.09% |
| 8001 – 9000 | 111,000 | 0.03% |
| 9000 – 10,000 | 37,000 | 0.01% |
| 10,000 + | 2,000 | < 0.01% |

== Satellite missions ==
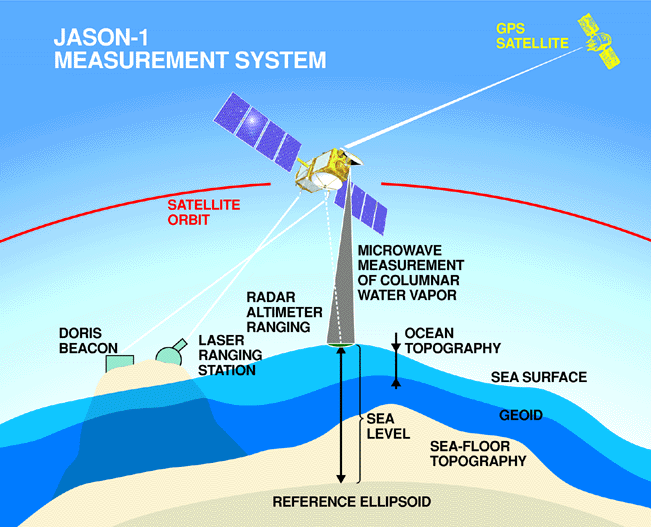
Jason-1 maps global ocean surface topography every 10 days.

Currently there are nine different satellites calculating the earth ocean topography, Cryosat-2, SARAL, Jason-3, Sentinel-3A and Sentinel-3B, CFOSat, HY-2B and HY-2C, and Sentinel-6 Michael Freilich (also called Jason-CS A). Jason-3 and Sentinel-6 Michael Freilich are currently both in space orbiting Earth in a tandem rotation. They are approximately 330 kilometers apart.

Ocean surface topography can be derived from ship-going measurements of temperature and salinity at depth. However, since 1992, a series of satellite altimetry missions, beginning with TOPEX/Poseidon and continued with Jason-1, Ocean Surface Topography Mission on the Jason-2 satellite, Jason-3 and now Sentinel-6 Michael Freilich have measured sea surface height directly. By combining these measurements with gravity measurements from NASA's Grace and ESA's GOCE missions, scientists can determine sea surface topography to within a few centimeters.

Jason-1 was launched by a Boeing Delta II rocket in California in 2001 and continued measurements initially collected by TOPEX/Poseidon satellite, which orbited from 1992 up until 2006. NASA and CNES, the French space agency, are joint partners in this mission.

The main objectives of the Jason satellites is to collect data on the average ocean circulation around the globe in order to better understand its interaction with the time varying components and the involved mechanisms for initializing ocean models. To monitor the low frequency ocean variability and observe the season cycles and inter-annual variations like El Niño and La Niña, the North Atlantic oscillation, the pacific decadal oscillation, and planetary waves crossing the oceans over a period of months, then they will be modeled over a long period of time due to the precise altimetric observations. It aims to contribute to observations of the mesoscale ocean variability, affecting the whole oceans. This activity is especially intense near western boundary currents. Also monitor the average sea level because it is a large indicator of global warming through the sea level data. Improvement of tide modeling by observing more long period components such as coastal interactions, internal waves, and tidal energy dissipation. Finally the satellite data will supply knowledge to support other types of marine meteorology which is the scientific study of the atmosphere.

Jason-2 was launched on June 20, 2008, by a Delta-2 rocket out of the California site in Vandenberg and terminated its mission on October 10, 2019. Jason-3 was launched on January 16, 2016 by a Falcon-9 SpaceX rocket from Vandenberg, as well as Sentinel-6 Michael Freilich, launched on November 21, 2020.

The long-term objectives of the Jason satellite series are to provide global descriptions of the seasonal and yearly changes of the circulation and heat storage in the ocean. This includes the study of short-term climatic changes such as El Nino, La Nina. The satellites detect global sea level mean and record the fluctuations. Also detecting the slow change of upper ocean circulation on decadal time scales, every ten years. Studying the transportation of heat and carbon in the ocean and examining the main components that fuel deep water tides. The satellites data collection also helps improve wind speed and height measurements in current time and for long-term studies. Lastly improving our knowledge about the marine geoid. The first seven months Jason-2 was put into use it was flown in extreme close proximity to Jason-1. Only being one minute apart from each other the satellites observed the same area of the ocean. The reason for the close proximity in observation was for cross-calibration. This was meant to calculate any bias in the two altimeters. This multiple month observation proved that there was no bias in the data and both collections of data were consistent.

A new satellite mission called the Surface Water Ocean Topography Mission has been proposed to make the first global survey of the topography of all of Earth's surface water—the ocean, lakes and rivers. This study is aimed to provide a comprehensive view of Earth's freshwater bodies from space and more much detailed measurements of the ocean surface than ever before.

== See also ==
- Dynamic topography
- Eddy (fluid dynamics)
- SARAL
- Sea surface microlayer
