= DORIS (satellite system) =

French civilian geopositioning system

- The DORIS antenna and receiver installed onboard OSTM/Jason-2 satellite
- Country/ies of origin: France
- Operator: CNES
- Type: Civilian
- Status: Operational

Constellation size
- Nominal satellites: 0 (ground transmitters only)
- First launch: 1990

DORIS is a French satellite system used for the determination of satellite orbits (e.g. TOPEX/Poseidon) and for positioning. The name is an acronym of "Doppler Orbitography and Radiopositioning Integrated by Satellite" or, in French, Détermination d'Orbite et Radiopositionnement Intégré par Satellite.

== Principle ==
Ground-based radio beacons emit a signal which is picked up by receiving satellites. This is in reverse configuration to other GNSS, in which the transmitters are space-borne and receivers are in majority near the surface of the Earth. A frequency shift of the signal occurs that is caused by the movement of the satellite (Doppler effect). From this observation satellite orbits, ground positions, as well as other parameters can be derived.

== Organization ==
DORIS is a French system which was initiated and is maintained by the French Space Agency (CNES). It is operated from Toulouse.

== Ground segment ==
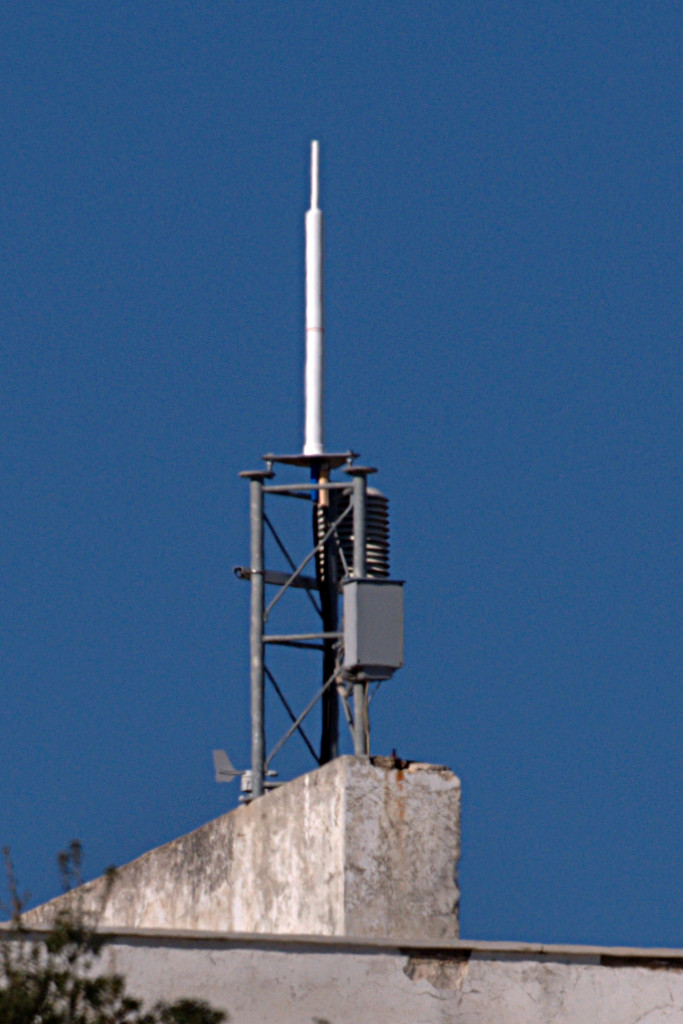
The UHF transmitting antenna of DORIS ground station at Dionysos, Greece

The ground segment includes about 50-60 ground stations, equally distributed over the Earth and ensure a good coverage for orbit determination. For the installation of a beacon only electricity is required because the station only emits a signal but does not receive any information. DORIS beacons transmit to the satellites on two UHF frequencies, 401.25 MHz and 2036.25 MHz.

=== Australian ground segments ===
There are two active DORIS stations in Australia:

- Yatharagga - active
- Orroral Valley Tracking Station - no longer active
- Mount Stromlo Observatory - currently active, replaced Orroral Valley Tracking station installation

== Space segment ==
The best known satellites equipped with DORIS receivers are the altimetry satellites TOPEX/Poseidon, Jason-1, OSTM/Jason-2, Jason-3, and Sentinel-6 Michael Freilich. They are used to observe the ocean surface as well as currents or wave heights. DORIS contributes to their orbit accuracy of about 2 cm.

Other DORIS satellites are the Envisat, SPOT, HY-2A and CryoSat-2 satellites.

== Positioning ==
Apart from orbit determination, the DORIS observations are used for positioning of ground stations. The accuracy is a bit lower than with GPS, but it still contributes to the International Terrestrial Reference Frame (ITRF).

== See also ==
- Argos (satellite system)
