= Proteus (satellite) =

Satellite platform built by Thales Group

PROTEUS (acronym for Reconfigurable Platform for Observation, Telecommunications and Scientific Uses) is a 3-axis stabilized platform designed for mini-satellites weighing approximately 500 kg operating in low Earth orbit. The platform is used by six scientific satellites developed as part of the space program of the National Center for Space Studies (CNES) for the European Space Agency: Jason-1, 2 and 3, CALIPSO, CoRoT, and SMOS. The platform is developed by the satellite division of Aérospatiale (in 2016 Thales Alenia Space).

== History ==
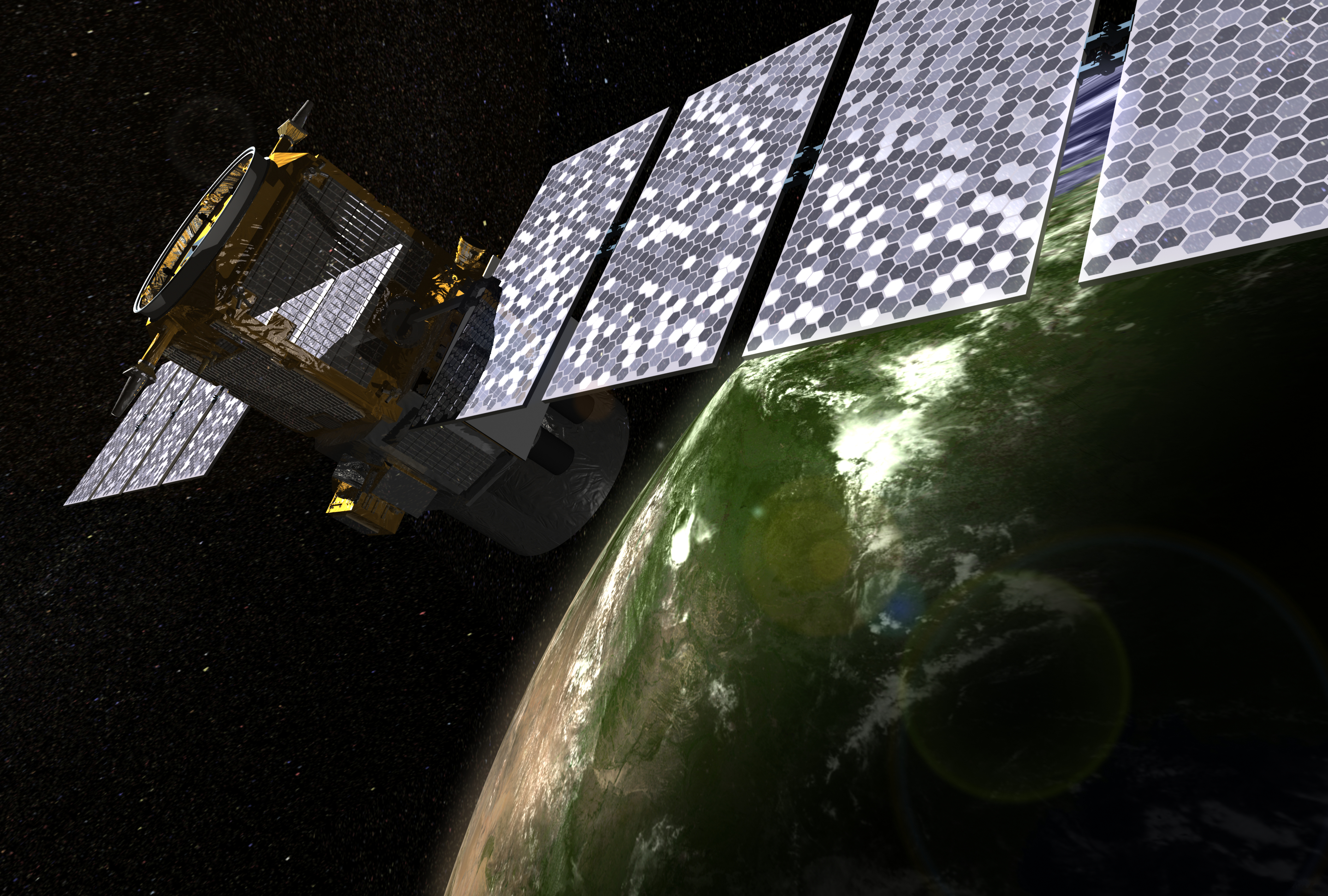
CALIPSO satellite (artist's rendering), 2005

In 1993, CNES decided to launch the development of the PROTEUS mini-satellite program in parallel and jointly with the Jason-1 satellite, the first user for the platform. Program goals included meeting recurring requirements for satellite solutions in the 500 kg-700 kg class intended for operation in low orbits as platforms for various science and applications. After an industrial consultation with the national prime contractors of the time, Aérospatiale (Cannes) was selected, in May 1996, as industrial prime contractor, with the system to be built in the Cannes-Mandelieu space center.

By 2010, the PROTEUS platform accumulated 20 years of on-orbit success, with the five satellites that had been orbited: Jason-1, CALIPSO, CoRoT, Jason-2, and SMOS.

In the same multi-mission platform perspective, the Myriade program to support mission objectives achievable with microsatellites weighing less than 200 kg.

== Technical Characteristics ==
PROTEUS is a 3-axis stabilized platform designed for missions in low earth orbit for satellites with a total mass of approximately 500 kg, including 270 kg for the platform excluding propellants. Its main features are as follows:

- Dimensions: 954 mm x 954 mm x 1,000 mm
- Energy: solar panels with an area of 9.5 m^{2}, with one degree of freedom and providing 450 watts (Jason-1) to 550 watts (Jason-3) at the theoretical end of life
- Attitude control: the satellite is stabilized on 3 axes with a pointing precision of 0.15° (Jason-3). The fine sensors used to determine the orientation of the satellite are two three-axis star finder and three two-axis gyrometers. The coarse sensors are three-axis magnetometers and 8 solar sensors with an optical field of 4 ft. The orientation is corrected using four reaction wheels which are desaturated using magneto-couplers.
- Propulsion: liquid propellant rocket motors burning hydrazine with a Delta-v capacity of about 120 m/s. The mass of hydrazine carried is 28 kg (Jason-3).
- Data storage: 500 megabits for telemetry data and 2 gigabits for scientific data.
- Communications: S-band telecommunications with a maximum throughput of 800 kilobits/s.
- Lifespan: 3 years for consumables, 5 years for hardware and radiation tolerance.

== Responsibilities ==
The PROTEUS platform and command and control segment has been developed based on a partnership between CNES and Aérospatiale (now Thales). The integrated team carries out the design of the PROTEUS multi-mission bus, the industrial production of the platform and associated satellites of which is the responsibility of Thales Alenia Space. In accordance with the partnership agreements, CNES remains in contro of workfor its own missions.

== Applications ==
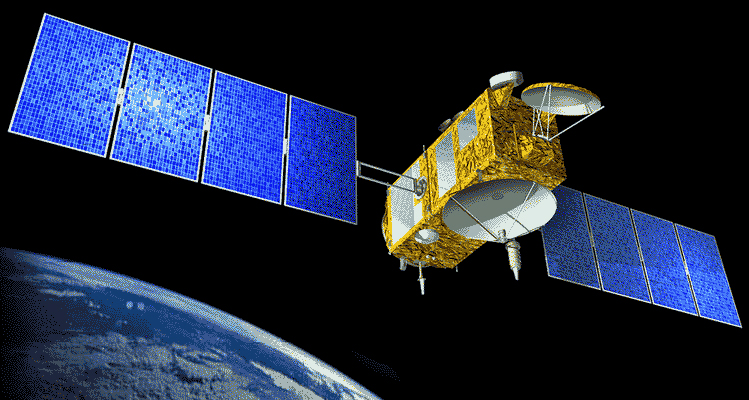
Artists rendering Jason-1 in orbit, 2007

Six satellites use this platform:

- Jason-1, remote sensing for measuring the height of the oceans, launched on December 7, 2001. It celebrated its tenth anniversary in 2011 and reached end of mission in 2013
- CALIPSO, launched April 28, 2006, meteorological satellite that has been operating for more than 14 years.
- CoRoT, space telescope for studying the internal structure of stars and searching for exoplanets, launched on December 27, 2006.
- OSTM/Jason-2, follow-on mission to Jason-1, launched on June 20, 2008.
- SMOS, soil humidity study mission, launched on November 2, 2009.
- Jason-3, copy of Jason-2, ordered on February 24, 2010 by EUMETSAT and placed in orbit in January 2016. This is the most recent satellite using this platform.

== Bibliography ==
- Sghedoni, M.; et al. (1997), "Attitude and Orbit Control System for Multimission Spacecraft Platform", Spacecraft Guidance, Navigation and Control Systems, Proceedings of the 3rd ESA International Conference, vol. 341, pp. 133–139, Bibcode:1997ESASP.381..133S, ISBN 9290922079, Sghedoni1997
