= OSTM/Jason-2 =

International Earth observation satellite mission

Ocean Surface Topography Mission / Jason-2
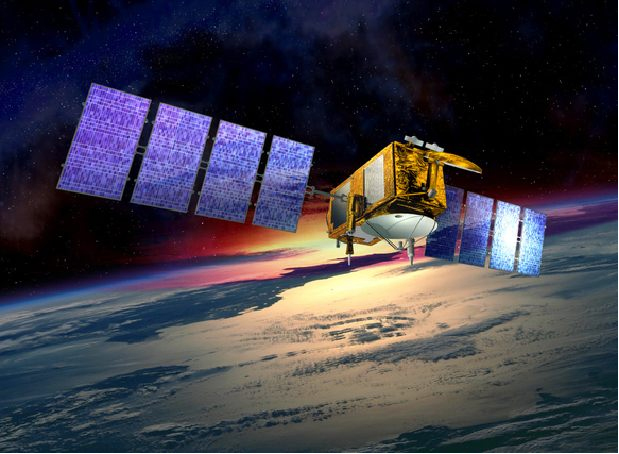
- Artist's interpretation of the OSTM/Jason-2 satellite
- Names: Jason-2; Ocean Surface Topography Mission; OSTM
- Mission type: Oceanography mission
- Operator: NASA, NOAA, CNES, EUMETSAT
- COSPAR ID: 2008-032A
- SATCAT no.: 33105
- Website: Ocean Surface Topography from Space
- Mission duration: 3 years (planned); 11 years, 3 months, 18 days (achieved)

Spacecraft properties
- Bus: Proteus
- Manufacturer: Thales Alenia Space
- Launch mass: 510 kg (1,120 lb)
- Power: 500 watts

Start of mission
- Launch date: 20 June 2008, 07:46:25 UTC
- Rocket: Delta II 7320-10C (Delta D334)
- Launch site: Vandenberg, SLC-2W
- Contractor: United Launch Alliance

End of mission
- Deactivated: 9 October 2019

Orbital parameters
- Reference system: Geocentric orbit
- Regime: Low Earth orbit
- Altitude: 1,336 km (830 mi)
- Inclination: 66.00°
- Period: 112.00 minutes

OSTM/Jason-2, or Ocean Surface Topography Mission/Jason-2 satellite, was an international Earth observation satellite altimeter joint mission for sea surface height measurements between NASA and CNES. It was the third satellite in a series started in 1992 by the NASA/CNES TOPEX/Poseidon mission and continued by the NASA/CNES Jason-1 mission launched in 2001.

== History ==
Like its two predecessors, OSTM/Jason-2 used high-precision ocean altimetry to measure the distance between the satellite and the ocean surface to within a few centimeters. These very accurate observations of variations in sea surface height — also known as ocean topography — provide information about global sea level, the speed and direction of ocean currents, and heat stored in the ocean.

Jason-2 was built by Thales Alenia Space using a Proteus platform, under a contract from CNES, as well as the main Jason-2 instrument, the Poseidon-3 altimeter (successor to the Poseidon and Poseidon 2 altimeter on-board TOPEX/Poseidon and Jason-1). Scientists consider the 15-plus-year climate data record that this mission extended to be critical to understanding how ocean circulation is linked to global climate change.

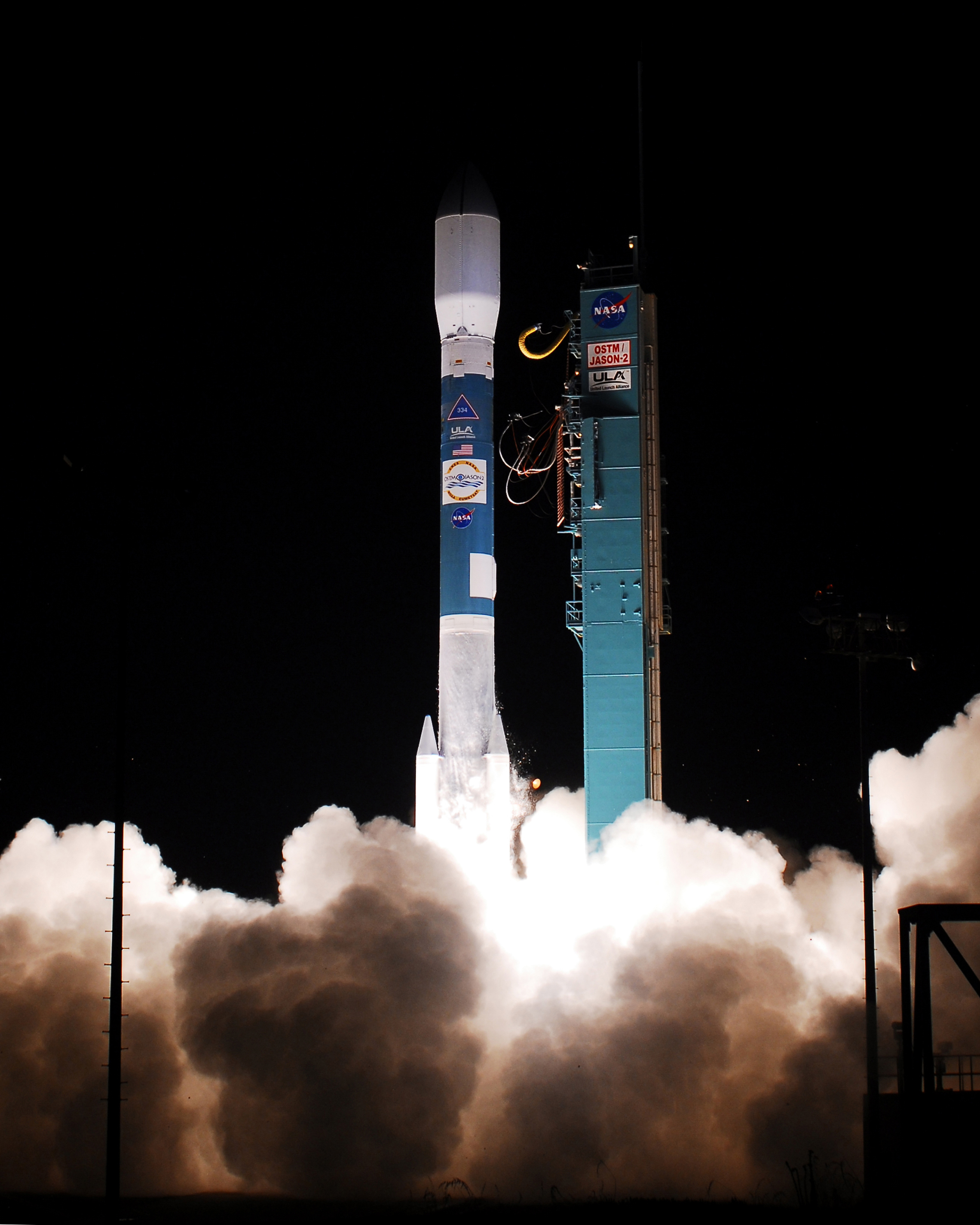
Team Vandenberg successfully launches a Delta II rocket from Space Launch Complex-2 at 12:46 a.m. Friday. The rocket carried the OSTM/Jason-2 Satellite into an 830-mile near-circular orbit.

OSTM/Jason-2 was launched on 20 June 2008, at 07:46 UTC, from Space Launch Complex 2W at Vandenberg Air Force Base in California, by a Delta II 7320 rocket. The spacecraft separated from the rocket 55 minutes later.

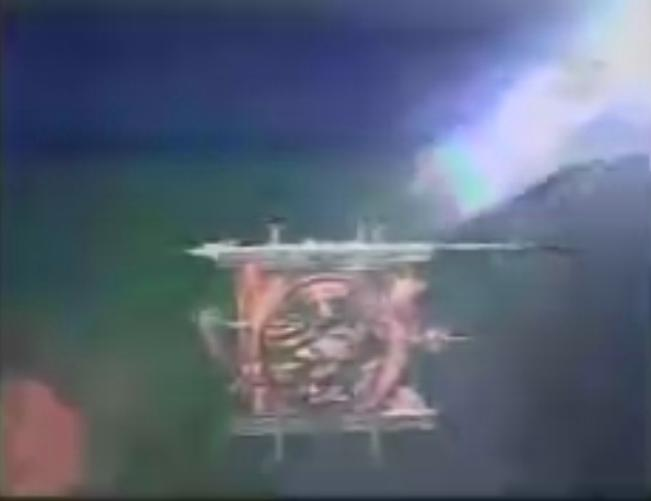
Jason-2 after separation from its launch vehicle

It was placed in a 1,336 km (830 mi) circular, non-Sun-synchronous orbit at an inclination of 66.0° to Earth's equator, allowing it to monitor 95% of Earth's ice-free ocean every 10 days. Jason-1 was moved to the opposite side of Earth from Jason-2 and now flies over the same region of the ocean that Jason-2 flew over five days earlier. Jason-1's ground tracks fall midway between those of Jason-2, which are about 315 km (196 mi) apart at the equator. This interleaved tandem mission provided twice the number of measurements of the ocean's surface, bringing smaller features such as ocean eddies into view. The tandem mission also helped pave the way for a future ocean altimeter mission that would collect much more detailed data with its single instrument than the two Jason satellites did together.

With OSTM/Jason-2, ocean altimetry made the transition from research into operational mode. Responsibility for collecting these measurements moved from the space agencies to the world's weather and climate forecasting agencies, which use them for short-range, seasonal, and long-range weather and climate forecasting.

== Science objectives ==
- Extend the time series of ocean surface topography measurements beyond TOPEX/Poseidon and Jason-1 to accomplish two decades of observations
- Provide a minimum of three years of global ocean surface topography measurement
- Determine the variability of ocean circulation at decadal time scales from combined data record of TOPEX/Poseidon and Jason-1
- Improve the measure of the time-averaged ocean circulation
- Improve the measure of global sea-level change
- Improve open ocean tide models

== Ocean altimetry ==
"Spaceborne radar altimeters have proven to be superb tools for mapping ocean-surface topography, the hills and valleys of the sea surface. These instruments send a microwave pulse to the ocean's surface and time how long it takes to return. A microwave radiometer corrects any delay that may be caused by water vapor in the atmosphere. Other corrections are also required to account for the influence of electrons in the ionosphere and the dry air mass of the atmosphere. Combining these data with the precise location of the spacecraft makes it possible to determine sea-surface height to within a few centimetres (about one inch). The strength and shape of the returning signal also provides information on wind speed and the height of ocean waves. These data are used in ocean models to calculate the speed and direction of ocean currents and the amount and location of heat stored in the ocean, which, in turn, reveals global climate variations".

== Atomic clock synchronization ==
Another payload aboard Jason-2 is the T2L2 (Time Transfer by Laser Link) instrument. T2L2 is used to synchronize atomic clocks at ground stations, and to calibrate the on-board clock of the Jason-2 DORIS instrument. On 6 November 2008, CNES reported the T2L2 instrument was working well.

== Joint effort ==
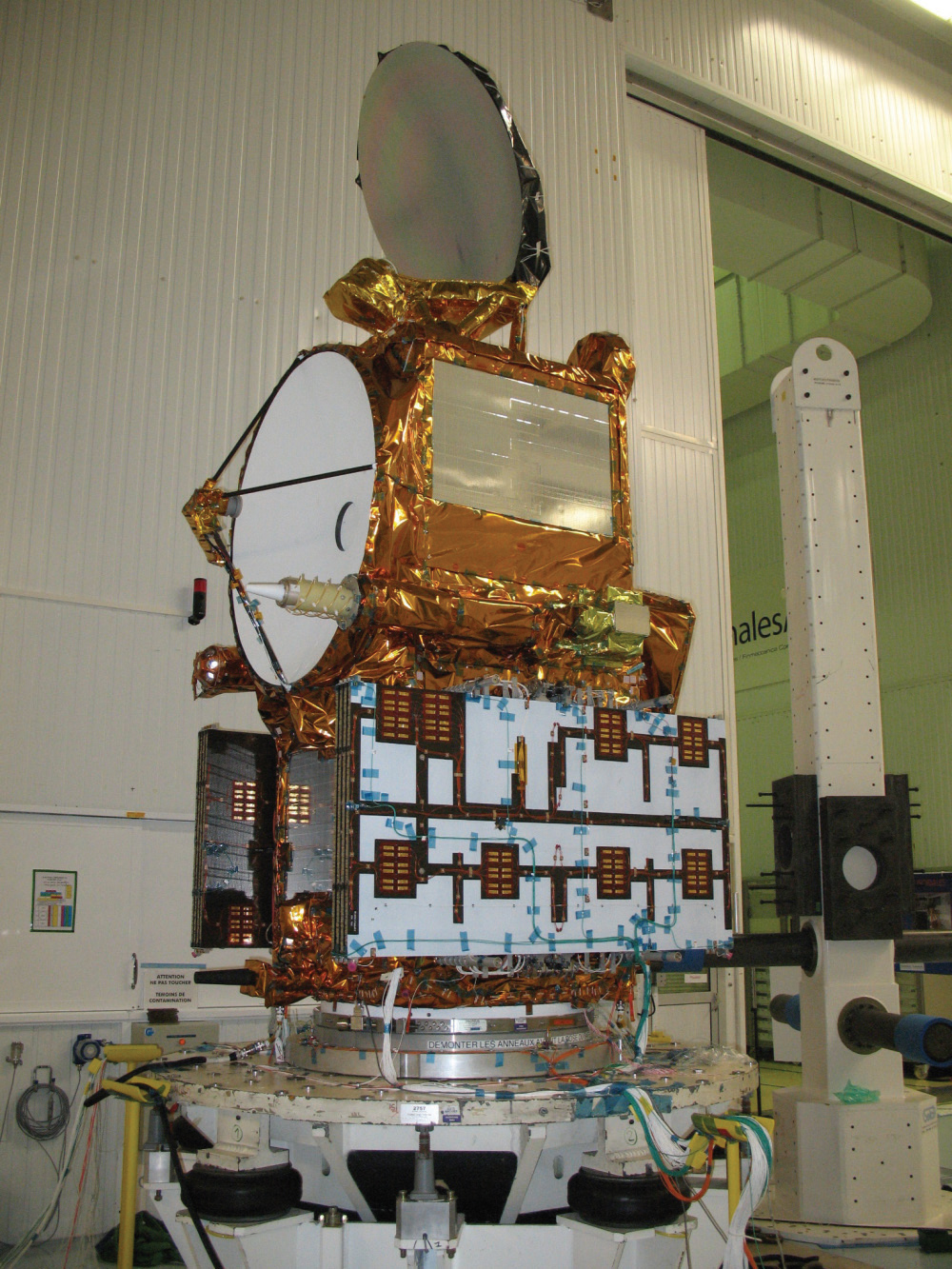
Jason 2 just before launch

OSTM/Jason-2 was a joint effort by four organizations. The mission participants were:

- National Oceanic and Atmospheric Administration (NOAA)
- National Aeronautics and Space Administration (NASA)
- France's Centre national d'études spatiales (CNES)
- European Organisation for the Exploitation of Meteorological Satellites (EUMETSAT)

CNES provided the spacecraft, NASA and CNES jointly provided the payload instruments, and NASA's Launch Services Program at the Kennedy Space Center was responsible for the launch management and countdown operations. After completing the on-orbit commissioning of the spacecraft, CNES handed over operation and control of the spacecraft to NOAA in October 2008.

CNES processed, distributed, and archived the research-quality data products that became available in 2009. EUMETSAT processed and distributed operational data received by its ground station to users in Europe and archived that data. NOAA processed and distributed operational data received by its ground stations to non-European users and archived that data along with the CNES data products. NOAA and EUMETSAT both generated near-real-time data products and distributed them to users.

NASA evaluated the performance of the following instruments: the Advanced Microwave Radiometer (AMR), the Global Positioning System payload, and the Laser Retroreflector Assembly (LRA). NASA and CNES also validated scientific data products together. NASA's Jet Propulsion Laboratory in Pasadena, California, managed the mission for NASA's Science Mission Directorate in Washington, D.C.

== Prior similar missions ==
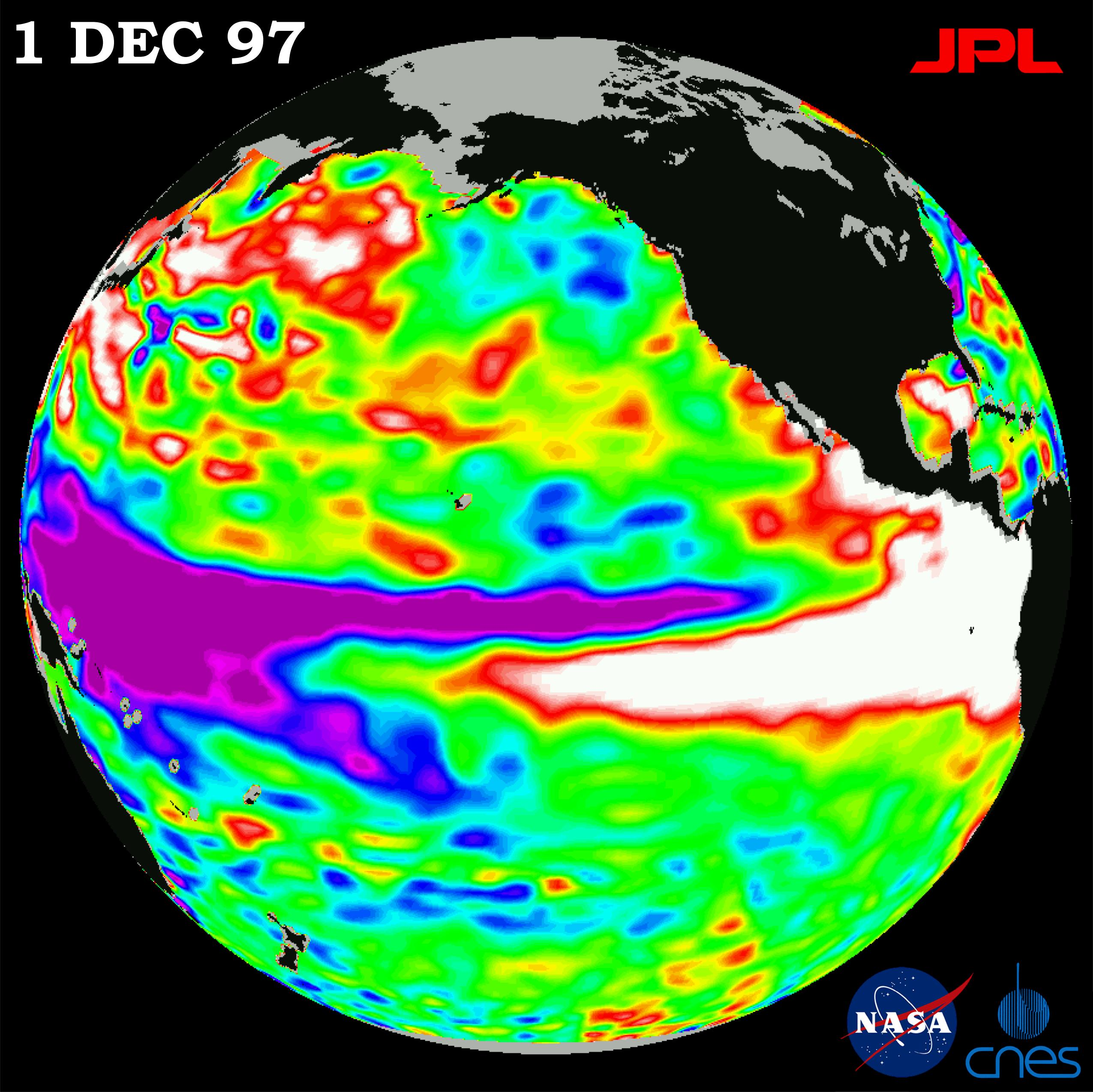
OSTM/Jason-2's predecessor TOPEX/Poseidon caught the largest El Niño in a century seen in this image from 1 December 1997.

The two previous altimetry missions, TOPEX/Poseidon and Jason-1, led to major advances in the science of physical oceanography and in climate studies. Their 15-year data record of ocean surface topography provided the first opportunity to observe and understand the global change of ocean circulation and sea level. Their results improved scientific understanding of the role of the ocean in climate change and improved weather and climate predictions. Data from these missions were used to improve ocean models, forecast hurricane intensity, and identify and track large ocean/atmosphere phenomena such as El Niño and La Niña. The data was also used in daily applications as diverse as routing ships, improving the safety and efficiency of offshore industry operations, managing fisheries and tracking marine mammals.

Some of the areas in which TOPEX/Poseidon and Jason-1 have made major contributions, and to which OSTM/Jason-2 continued to add, are:

- Ocean variability

The missions revealed the surprising variability of the ocean, how much it changes from season to season, year to year, decade to decade and on even longer time scales. They ended the traditional notion of a quasi-steady, large-scale pattern of global ocean circulation by proving that the ocean is changing rapidly on all scales, from huge features such as El Nino and La Nina, which can cover the entire equatorial Pacific, to tiny eddies swirling off the large Gulf Stream in the Atlantic Ocean.

- Sea level change

Measurements by TOPEX/Poseidon and Jason-1 show that mean sea level has been rising by about 3 mm (0.12 inches) a year since 1993. This is about twice the estimates from tide gauges for the previous century, indicating a possible recent acceleration in the rate of sea level rise. The data record from these altimetry missions has given scientists important insights into how global sea level is affected by natural climate variability, as well as by human activities.

- Planetary waves

TOPEX/Poseidon and Jason-1 made clear the importance of planetary-scale waves, such as Rossby and Kelvin waves. Thousands of kilometres wide, these waves are driven by wind under the influence of Earth's rotation and are important mechanisms for transmitting climate signals across the large ocean basins. At high latitudes, they travel twice as fast as scientists believed previously, showing the ocean responds much more quickly to climate changes than was known before these missions.

- Ocean tides

The precise measurements of TOPEX/Poseidon's and Jason-1 have brought knowledge of ocean tides to an unprecedented level. The change of water level due to tidal motion in the deep ocean is known everywhere on the globe to within 2.5 centimetres (one inch). This new knowledge has revised notions about how tides dissipate. Instead of losing all their energy over shallow seas near the coasts, as previously believed, about one third of tidal energy is actually lost to the deep ocean. There, the energy is consumed by mixing water of different properties, a fundamental mechanism in the physics governing the general circulation of the ocean.

- Ocean models

TOPEX/Poseidon and Jason-1 observations provided the first global data for improving the performance of the numerical ocean models that are a key component of climate prediction models.

== Data use and benefits ==
Validated data products in support of improved weather, climate and ocean forecasts were distributed to the public within a few hours of observation. Beginning in 2009, other data products for climate research were made available a few days to a few weeks after observations were taken by the satellite. Altimetry data have a wide variety of uses from basic scientific research on climate to ship routing. Applications include:

- Climate research: altimetry data are incorporated into computer models to understand and predict changes in the distribution of heat in ocean, a key element of climate.
- El Niño and La Niña forecasting: understanding the pattern and effects of climate cycles such as El Niño helps predict and mitigate the disastrous effects of floods and drought.
- Tropical cyclone forecasting: altimeter data and satellite ocean wind data are incorporated into atmospheric models for hurricane season forecasting and individual storm severity.
- Ship routing: maps of currents, eddies, and vector winds are used in commercial shipping and recreational yachting to optimize routes.
- Offshore industries: cable-laying vessels and offshore oil operations require accurate knowledge of ocean circulation patterns, to minimize impacts from strong currents.
- Marine mammal research: sperm whales, fur seals, and other marine mammals can be tracked, and therefore studied, around ocean eddies where nutrients and plankton are abundant.
- Fisheries management: satellite data identify ocean eddies which bring an increase in organisms that comprise the marine food web, attracting fish and fishermen.
- Coral reef research: remotely sensed data are used to monitor and assess coral reef ecosystems, which are sensitive to changes in ocean temperature.
- Marine debris tracking: altimetry can help locate hazardous materials such as floating and partially submerged fishing nets, timber, and ship debris.

== End of mission ==
The OSTM/Jason-2 mission concluded on 1 October 2019, after NASA and its mission partners made the decision to decommission the spacecraft upon discovering significant recent deterioration of the spacecraft's power systems. The decommissioning of the satellite took some days; the final decommissioning activities on the satellite ended 9 October 2019, with the satellite rendered fully inactive. Because Jason-2 is orbiting at an altitude of over 1,300 km (810 mi), NASA estimates that it will remain in orbit for at least 500 to 1,000 years after decommissioning.

== Future ==
The fourth spacecraft to be part of the Ocean Surface Topography Mission is Jason-3. Like its predecessors, the primary instrument aboard Jason-3 is a radar altimeter. Additional instruments include:

- A microwave radiometer
- DORIS (Doppler Orbitography and Radiopositioning Integrated by Satellite)
- A Laser Retroreflector Array (LRA)
- A Global Positioning System (GPS) receiver

Jason-3 launched from Vandenberg Air Force Base on board a SpaceX Falcon 9 v1.1 launch vehicle in 2016. The satellite was shipped to Vandenberg Air Force Base on 18 June 2015, and after delays due to a June 2015 Falcon 9 launch failure, the mission was launched 17 January 2016 at 18:42:18 UTC.

The technologies and data-sets pioneered by Jason-1, OSTM/Jason-2, and Jason-3, will be continued through the Sentinel-6/Jason-CS satellites, planned for launch in 2020 and 2025.

== See also ==
- Jason-3
- Remote sensing
- French space program
