= Jason-3 =

International Earth observation satellite mission

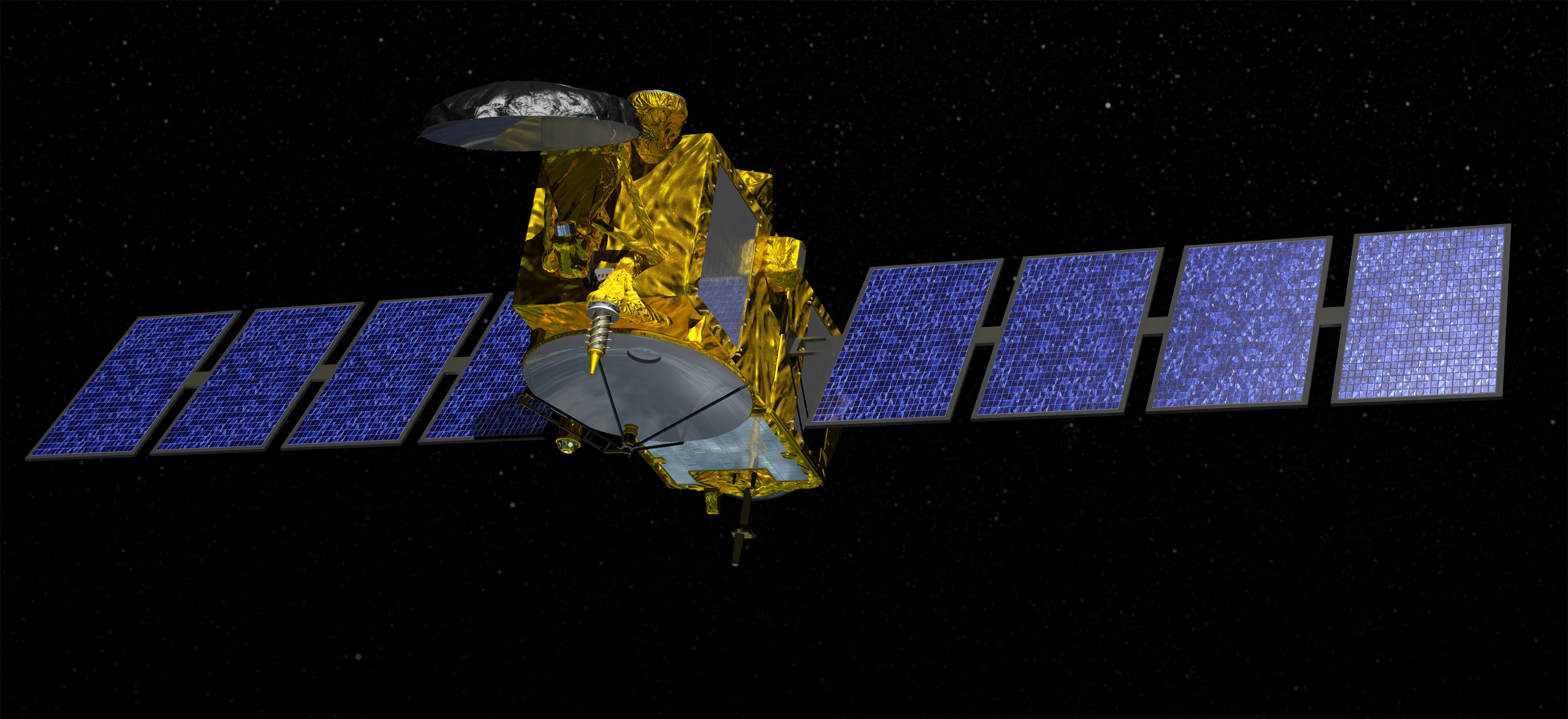
- Artist's impression of the Jason-3 satellite
- Mission type: Oceanography mission
- Operator: NASA, NOAA, CNES, EUMETSAT
- COSPAR ID: 2016-002A
- SATCAT no.: 41240
- Website: https://www.nesdis.noaa.gov/jason-3
- Mission duration: 5 years (planned); 10 years, 7 months and 2 days (elapsed)

Spacecraft properties
- Bus: Proteus
- Manufacturer: Thales Alenia Space
- Launch mass: 553 kg (1,219 lb)
- Dry mass: 525 kg (1,157 lb)
- Power: 550 watts

Start of mission
- Launch date: 17 January 2016, 18:42:18 UTC
- Rocket: Falcon 9 v1.1
- Launch site: Vandenberg, SLC-4E
- Contractor: SpaceX

Orbital parameters
- Reference system: Geocentric orbit
- Regime: Low Earth orbit
- Perigee altitude: 1,331.7 km (827.5 mi)
- Apogee altitude: 1,343.7 km (834.9 mi)
- Inclination: 66.04°
- Period: 112.42 minutes
- Repeat interval: 9.92 days
Instruments
- Poseidon-3B Altimeter
- AMR-2: Advanced Microwave Radiometer-2 (AMR)
- DORIS: Doppler Orbitography and Radiopositioning Integrated by Satellite (DORIS)
- GPSP: Global Positioning System Payload
- LRA: Laser Retroreflector Array (LRA)
- CARMEN-3: Characterization and Modeling of Environment-3
- LPT: Light Particle Telescope

Jason-3 is a satellite altimeter created by a partnership of the European Organisation for the Exploitation of Meteorological Satellites (EUMETSAT) and National Aeronautic and Space Administration (NASA), and is an international cooperative mission in which National Oceanic and Atmospheric Administration (NOAA) is partnering with the Centre National d'Études Spatiales (CNES, French space agency). The satellite's mission is to supply data for scientific, commercial, and practical applications to sea level rise, sea surface temperature, ocean temperature circulation, and climate change.

== Mission objectives ==
Jason-3 makes precise measurements related to global sea-surface height. Because sea surface height is measured via altimetry, mesoscale ocean features are better simulated since the Jason-3 radar altimeter can measure global sea-level variations with very high accuracy. The scientific goal is to produce global sea-surface height measurements every 10 days to an accuracy of less than 4 cm. In order to calibrate the radar altimeter, a microwave radiometer measures signal delay caused by atmospheric vapors, ultimately correcting the altimeter's accuracy to 3.3 cm. This data is important to collect and analyze because it is a critical factor in understanding the changes in Earth's climate brought on by global warming as well as ocean circulation. NOAA's National Weather Service uses Jason-3's data to more accurately forecast tropical cyclones.

== Scientific applications ==
The primary users of Jason-3 data are people who are dependent on marine and weather forecasts for public safety, commerce and environmental purposes. Other users include scientists and people who are concerned with global warming and its relation to the ocean. National Oceanic and Atmospheric Administration (NOAA) and European Organisation for the Exploitation of Meteorological Satellites (EUMETSAT) are using the data primarily for monitoring wind and waves on the high seas, hurricane intensity, ocean surface currents, El Niño and La Niña forecasts, water levels of lakes and rivers. Jason-3 also reports on environmental issues such as algae blooms and oil spills. NASA and CNES are more interested in the research aspect, in terms of understanding and planning for climate change. Jason-3 can measure climate change via sea surface height because sea surface rise, averaged over annual time scales, is accelerated by warming global temperatures. Ultimately, the benefits of Jason-3 data will transfer to people and to the economy.

== Orbit ==
Animation of Jason-3's orbit from 20 May 2018 to 14 November 2018. Earth is not shown.

Jason-3 flies at the same 9.9-day repeat track orbit and this means the satellite will make observations over the same ocean point every 9.9 days. The orbital parameters are: 66.05º inclination, 1,380 km apogee, 1,328 km perigee, 112 minutes per revolution around Earth. It was set to fly 1 minute behind the now decommissioned Jason-2. The 1-minute time delay was applied in order to not miss any data collection between missions.

== Orbit determination instruments ==
In order to detect sea level change, we need to know the orbit height of the satellites as they revolve around Earth, to within 1 cm (0.4 inches). Combining instruments from three different techniques—GPS, DORIS, LRA. The GPS receiver on Jason-3 uses data from the constellation of GPS satellites in orbit to constantly determine its position in orbit. Similarly, DORIS is another system to help determine orbit positioning. Designed by CNES in France, DORIS uses the Doppler effect to found its system, which describes the differences in frequencies of waves between source and object. Thirdly, LRA (Laser Retroreflector Array), which is an instance of satellite laser ranging (SLR), uses corner reflectors on board the satellite to track the time it takes for lasers shot from Earth to reach the satellite and be reflected back, which can then be analyzed to understand the orbital positioning of Jason-3 from ground tracking stations. These three techniques (GPS, DORIS, LRA) all aid in determining orbit height and positioning.

== Launch ==
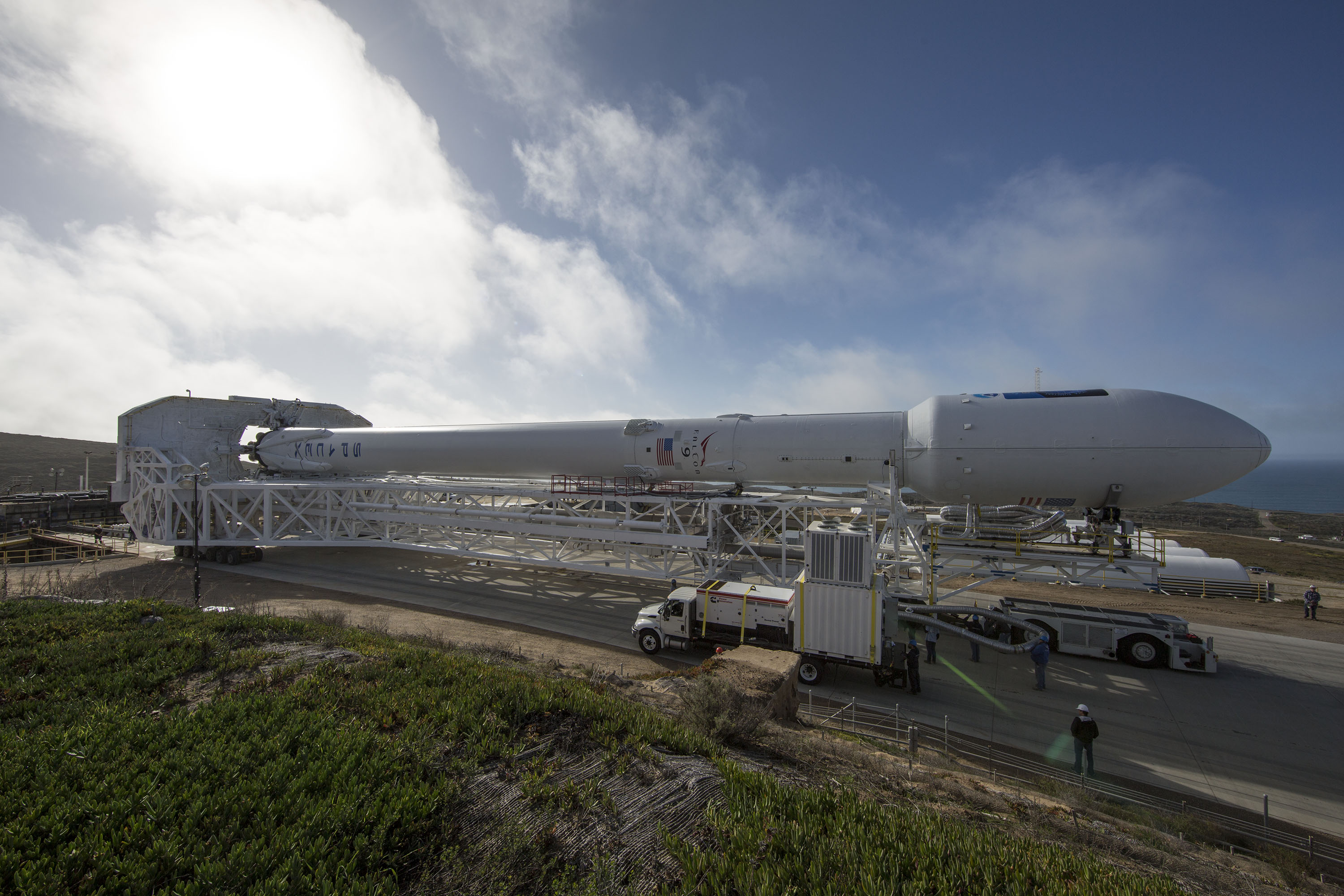
Falcon 9 rolling out on 15 January 2015

Appearing on the SpaceX manifest as early as July 2013, Jason-3 was originally scheduled for launch on 22 July 2015. However, this date was pushed back to 19 August 2015 following the discovery of contamination in one of the satellite's thrusters, requiring the thruster to be replaced and further inspected. The launch was further delayed by several months due to the loss of a Falcon 9 rocket with the CRS-7 mission on 28 June 2015.

After SpaceX conducted their return-to-flight mission in December 2015 with the upgraded Falcon 9 Full Thrust, Jason-3 was assigned to the final previous-generation Falcon 9 v1.1 rocket, although some parts of the rocket body had been reworked following the findings of the failure investigation.

A 7-second static fire test of the rocket was completed on 11 January 2016. The Launch Readiness Review was signed off by all parties on 15 January 2016, and the launch proceeded successfully on 17 January 2016, at 18:42 UTC. The Jason-3 payload was deployed into its target orbit at 830 mi (1,340 km) altitude after an orbital insertion burn about 56 minutes into the flight. It was the 21st Falcon 9 flight overall and the second into a high-inclination orbit from Vandenberg Air Force Base Space Launch Complex 4E in California.

== Post-mission landing test ==
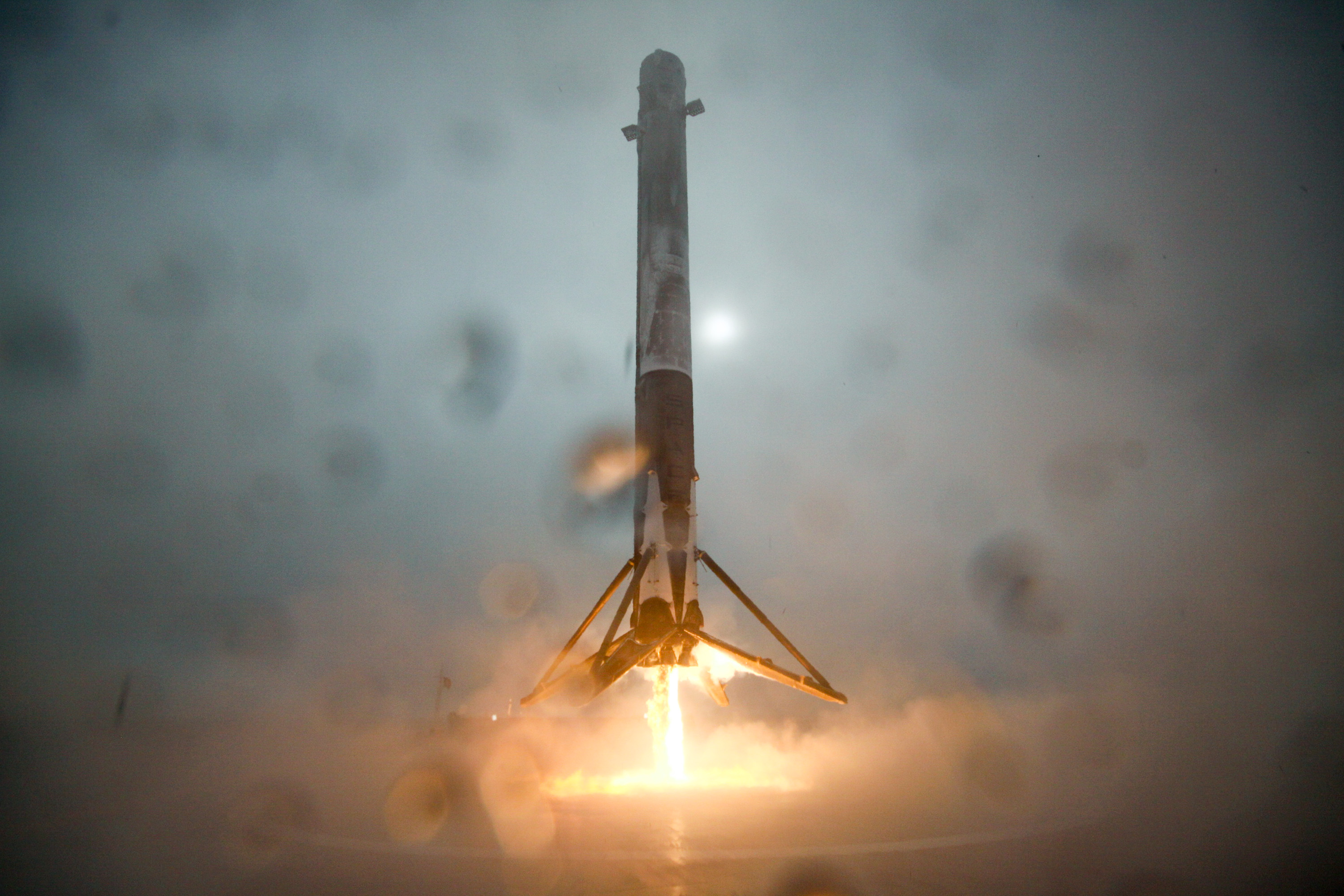
First stage of Falcon 9 Flight 21 descending over the floating landing platform, 17 January 2016

Following paperwork filed with US regulatory authorities in 2015, SpaceX confirmed in January 2016 that they would attempt a controlled-descent flight test and vertical landing of the rocket's first stage on their west-coast floating platform Just Read the Instructions, located about 200 mi (320 km) out in the Pacific Ocean.

This attempt followed the first successful landing and booster recovery on the previous launch in December 2015. The controlled descent through the atmosphere and landing attempt for each booster is an arrangement that is not used on other orbital launch vehicles.

Approximately nine minutes into the flight, the live video feed from the drone ship went down due to the losing its lock on the uplink satellite. Elon Musk later reported that the first stage did touch down smoothly on the ship, but a lockout on one of the four landing legs failed to latch, so that the booster fell over and was destroyed.

Debris from the fire, including several rocket engines attached to the octaweb assembly, arrived back to shore on board the floating landing platform on 18 January 2016.

== See also ==
- French space program
- TOPEX/Poseidon
- Jason-1
- OSTM/Jason-2
- Sentinel-6 Michael Freilich (Jason-CS A)
- List of Falcon 9 and Falcon Heavy launches
