= Altimeter =

Instrument used to determine the height of an object above a certain point

Diagram showing the face of the three-pointer sensitive aircraft altimeter displaying an altitude of 10,180 ft (3,100 m). Reference pressure of about 29.92 inHg (1013 hPa) is showing in the Kollsman window.

An altimeter, or altitude meter, is an instrument used to measure the altitude of an object relative to a fixed level. The measurement of altitude is called altimetry, which is related to the term bathymetry, the measurement of depth under water.

== Types ==
=== Pressure altimeter ===
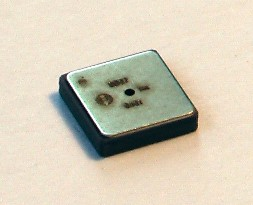
Digital barometric pressure sensor for altitude measurement in consumer electronic applications

Altitude can be determined by the measurement of atmospheric pressure. The greater the altitude, the lower the pressure. When a barometer is supplied with a nonlinear calibration so as to indicate altitude, the instrument is a type of altimeter called a pressure altimeter or barometric altimeter. A pressure altimeter is the altimeter found in most aircraft, and skydivers use wrist-mounted versions for similar purposes. Hikers and mountain climbers use wrist-mounted or hand-held altimeters, in addition to other navigational tools such as maps, magnetic compasses, and receivers for global navigation satellite systems (GNSS), such as GPS.

=== Sonic altimeter ===
In 1931, the US Army Air corps and General Electric together tested a sonic altimeter for aircraft, which was considered more reliable and accurate than one that relied on air pressure when heavy fog or rain was present. The new altimeter used a series of high-pitched sounds like those made by a bat to measure the distance from the aircraft to the surface, which on return to the aircraft was converted to feet shown on a gauge inside the aircraft cockpit.

=== Radar altimeter ===
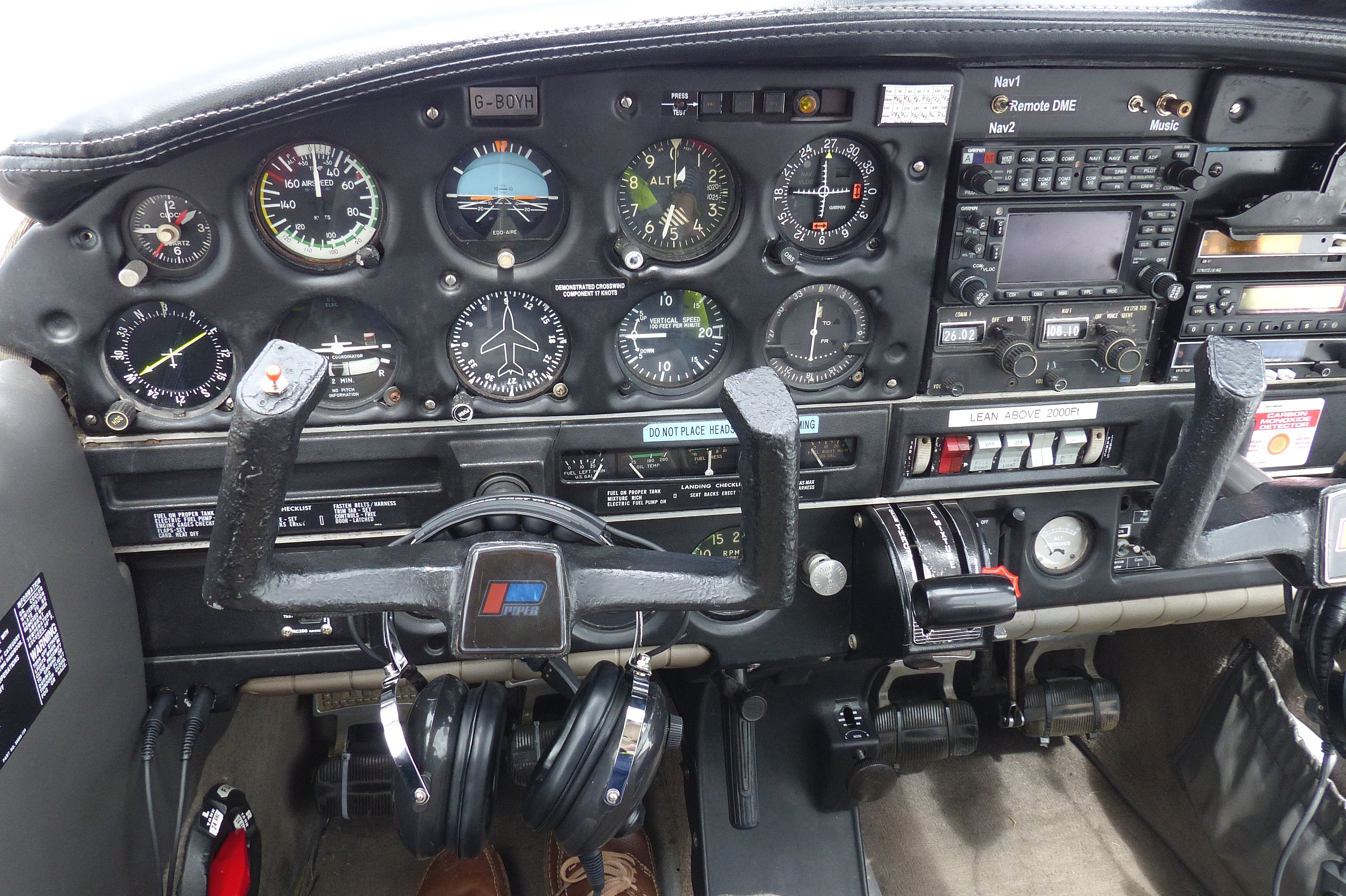
The altimeter on this Piper PA-28 is seen on the top row of instruments, second from right.

A radar altimeter measures altitude more directly, using the time taken for a radio signal to reflect from the surface back to the aircraft. Alternatively, Frequency Modulated Continuous-wave radar can be used. The greater the frequency shift the further the distance travelled. This method can achieve much better accuracy than the pulsed radar for the same outlay and radar altimeters that use frequency modulation are industry standard. The radar altimeter is used to measure height above ground level during landing in commercial and military aircraft. Radar altimeters are also a component of terrain avoidance warning systems, warning the pilot if the aircraft is flying too low, or if there is rising terrain ahead. Radar altimeter technology is also used in terrain-following radar allowing combat aircraft to fly at very low height above the terrain.

After extensive research and experimentation, it has been shown that "phase radio-altimeters" are most suitable for ground effect vehicles, as compared to laser, isotropic or ultrasonic altimeters.

=== Laser altimeter ===
Lidar technology is used to help navigate the helicopter Ingenuity on its record-setting flights over the terrain of Mars by means of a downward-facing Lidar altimeter.

=== Satellite navigation ===
Satellite navigation receivers like those used with the Global Positioning System (GPS) can also determine altitude by trilateration with four or more satellites. In aircraft, altitude determined using autonomous GPS is not reliable enough to supersede the pressure altimeter without using some method of augmentation. In hiking and climbing, it is common to find that the altitude measured by GPS is off by as much as 400 feet (122 metres) depending on satellite orientation.

== See also ==
- Acronyms and abbreviations in avionics
- ICAO recommendations on use of the International System of Units
- Flight instruments
- Flight level
- Hypsometer
- Jason-1 and Ocean Surface Topography Mission (Jason-2) are satellite missions that use altimeters to measure sea surface height
- Level sensor
- Lidar
- Pressure sensor
- Primary flight display
- Radar altimeter
- Satellite altimetry
- Turkish Airlines Flight 1951, an accident attributed to a malfunctioning radio altimeter
- United Airlines Flight 389, an accident attributed to misreading of an altimeter
- Variometer, a gauge measuring the rate of change of altitude
