= Space-based radar =

Use of radar systems mounted on satellites

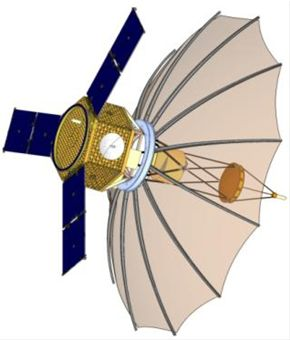
ORS-2

Space-based radar or spaceborne radar is a radar operating in outer space; orbiting radar is a radar in orbit and Earth orbiting radar is a radar in geocentric orbit. A number of Earth-observing satellites, such as RADARSAT, have employed synthetic aperture radar (SAR) to obtain terrain and land-cover information about the Earth.

== Military ==
In the United States, Discoverer II was a proposed military space-based radar program initiated in February 1998 as a joint Air Force, DARPA, and NRO program. The concept was to provide high-range-resolution ground moving target indication (GMTI), as well as SAR imaging and high-resolution digital mapping. This program was cancelled by Congress in 2007. SBR is a less-ambitious version of Discoverer II.

Space-based radar (SBR) is a proposed constellation of active radar satellites for the United States Department of Defense. The SBR system would allow detection and tracking of aircraft, ocean-going vessels (similar to the Soviet US-A program), and potentially land vehicles from space. This information would then be relayed to regional and national command centers, as well as E-10 MC2A airborne command posts.

=== Active military radar satellites ===
- Indian RISAT
- Russian Kondor
- Japanese Information Gathering Satellite
- German SAR-Lupe
- Chinese Huanjing
- Italian COSMO - Skymed COSMO-SkyMed

== Earth-observing radars ==
Use of radar sensor for Earth observation purposes was started by NASA/JPL's Seasat satellite, which carried three different radar sensors:

- a synthetic aperture radar (SAR) for high-resolution imaging
- a radar altimeter, to measure the ocean topography
- a wind scatterometer to measure wind speed and direction

Image of San Francisco from Umbra space radar

After Seasat, SARs, altimeters and scatterometers have been flown on several other space missions.

While the SAR, in principle, is similar to its airborne counterparts (with the advantage of the increased coverage and worldwide access offered by the satellite platform), the other two are specific to satellite operations.

A satellite radar-altimeter is a nadir-looking radar with very high range resolution, which measures the ocean surface topography with an accuracy in the order of few centimeters. Additionally, analysis of the echo amplitude and shape can extract information about the wind speed and wave height, respectively. Some radar-altimeters (like CryoSat/SIRAL) employ synthetic aperture and/or interferometric techniques: their reduced footprint allows mapping of rougher surfaces like polar ices.

A wind scatterometer observes the same portion of the ocean surface from different (at least 3) angles of view as the satellite passes by, measuring the echo amplitude and the corresponding surface reflectivity. Reflectivity being affected by the ocean surface "roughness", which in turn is affected by the wind and also dependent on its direction, this instrument can determine the wind speed and direction.

These three types of radar are currently used on several satellites. Scatterometers are of high value for operational meteorology, allowing reconstruction of wind fields on a global scale. Data from radar altimeters are used for the accurate determination of the geoid, monitoring of tides, ocean currents and other large-scale ocean phenomena such as El Niño.

SARs applications are many: they range from geology to crop monitoring, from measurement of sea ice to disaster monitoring to vessel traffic surveillance, not to forget the military applications (many civilian SAR satellites are, in fact, dual-use systems). SAR imaging offer the great advantage, over its optical counterparts, of not being affected by meteorological conditions such as clouds, fog, etc., making it the sensor of choice when continuity of data must be ensured. Additionally, SAR interferometry (both dual-pass or single-pass, as used in the SRTM mission) allows accurate 3-D Reconstruction.

Other types of radars have been flown for Earth observation missions: precipitation radars such as the Tropical Rainfall Measuring Mission, or cloud radars like the one used on Cloudsat.

Like other Earth observation satellites, radar satellites often use Sun-synchronous orbits so that diurnal variations of vegetation are ignored, allowing long-term variations to be more accurately measured.

== List of Earth-observing radar satellites ==
Earth-observing radar satellites and satellite constellations include the following, with operational dates.

=== Inactive ===
- RORSAT a.k.a. US-A (SAR, Soviet Union, 1967-1988, 33 satellites)
- Almaz (Soviet Union, 1973-1977)
- Seasat (SAR, altimeter, scatterometer, US, 1978)
- Geosat (altimeter, United States, 1985-1990)
- ERS-1 and ERS-2 (European Remote-Sensing Satellite) (altimeter, combined SAR/scatterometer, 1991-2011)
- RADARSAT-1 - natural resources and climate change (SAR, Canadian, 1995-2013)
- Tropical Rainfall Measuring Mission (precipitation radar, 1997-2015)
- JERS-1 (SAR, Japan, 1998-2001)
- QuikSCAT (scatterometer, United States, 1999-2008)
- Shuttle Imaging Radar on the Shuttle Radar Topography Mission (SAR, United States, 2000)
- Envisat (SAR, altimeter, European Space Agency, 2002-2012)
- RISAT-1 (SAR, ISRO India, 2012-2016)
- RISAT-2 (SAR- India 2009-2022)

=== Active ===
- Jason satellite series - joint US-France oceanographic altimeter missions
  - TOPEX/Poseidon (1992-2006)
  - Jason-1 (2001-2013)
  - OSTM/Jason-2 (2008-2019)
  - Jason-3 (2016-)
  - Sentinel-6 Michael Freilich (2020-)
  - Sentinel-6B, planned for launch in 2025
- CloudSat (cloud radar, United States, 2006-; daytime only since 2011)
- RISAT-2B
- RISAT-2BR1 (X-band SAR, ISRO, 2019-present)
- RISAT- 2BR2 (EOS-1)
- RISAT-1A (EOS-4)
- MetOp (scatterometer, European, 3 satellites, 2006-) with planned successor MetOp-SG
- NovaSAR-1 (2018-) S-Band Polarimetric SAR, UK
- SAR Lupe 1-5 (SAR, German Air Force; 5 satellites, 2006-)
- RADARSAT-2 (SAR, Canadian, 2007-)
- TerraSAR-X (SAR Germany, 2007-)
- COSMO-SkyMed 1st and 2nd generation (SAR, Italy, 2007-; 6 satellites as of 2023)
- TecSAR (SAR, Israel, 2008-)
- TanDEM-X (SAR Germany, 2010-)
- Sentinel-1 constellation, European Space Agency, SAR
  - Sentinel-1A (2014-)
  - Sentinel-1B (2016-2021)
  - Sentinel-1C (2024-)
  - Sentinel-1D (planned)
- SAOCOM (L band SAR constellation, Argentina, 2018-)
- Tomorrow-R1, the first commercial radar satellite, operated by Tomorrow.io (United States, 2023-)
- Umbra-SAR - operated by American firm Umbra Space
- NISAR (SAR, joint United States-India, largest SAR in Space, 2025-present)

=== Under development ===
- Space-Based Airborne Moving Target Indicator (SB-AMTI) United States Space Force, replacement for E-3 Sentry

== Planetary radars ==
Most of the radars flown as payload in planetary missions (i.e., not considering avionics radar, such as docking and landing radars used in Apollo and LEM) belong to two categories: imaging radars and sounders.

Imaging radars: Synthetic aperture radars are the only instruments capable of penetrating heavy cloud cover around planets such as Venus, which was the first target for such missions. Two Soviet spacecraft (Venera 15 and Venera 16) imaged the planet in 1983 and 1984 using SAR and Radar altimeters. The Magellan probe also imaged Venus in 1990 and 1994.

The only other target of an imaging radar mission has been Titan, the largest moon of Saturn, in order to penetrate its opaque atmosphere. The radar of the Cassini probe, which orbited Saturn between 2004 and 2017, provided images of Titan's surface during each fly-by of the moon. The Cassini radar was a multimode system and could operate as Synthetic Aperture Radar, radar altimeter, scatterometer and radiometer.

Sounding radars: these are low-frequency (normally, HF - 3 to 30 MHz - or lower) ground-penetrating Radars, used to acquire data about the planet sub-surface structure. Their low operating frequency allow them to penetrate hundreds of meters, or even kilometers, below the surface. Synthetic aperture techniques are normally exploited to reduce the ground footprint (due to the low operating frequency and the small allowable antenna dimensions, the beam is very wide) and, thus, the unwanted echo from other surface objects.

The first radar sounder flown was ALSE (Apollo Lunar Sounder Experiment) on board Apollo 17 in 1972.

Other sounder instruments flown (in this case around Mars), are MARSIS (Mars Advanced Radar for SubSurface and Ionosphere Sounding) on board the European Space Agency's Mars Express probe, and SHARAD (mars SHAllow RADar sounder) on JPL's Mars Reconnaissance Orbiter (MRO). Both are currently operational. A radar sounder is also used on the Japanese Moon probe SELENE, launched September 14, 2007.

A similar instrument (primarily devoted to ionospheric plasma probing) was embarked on the Japanese Martian mission Nozomi (launched in 1998 but lost).
