= Telespazio VEGA =

Telespazio VEGA are European aerospace companies and subsidiaries of Telespazio.

- Telespazio Germany GmbH is a German aerospace company
- Telespazio VEGA UK is a British space company
