= Vega space =

- Vega Space Ltd, a space company based in Hertfordshire, UK, now part of Telespazio VEGA UK
- Vega Space GmbH, a German aerospace company, now part of Telespazio VEGA Deutschland
