= Sentinel-1D =

European radar imaging satellite

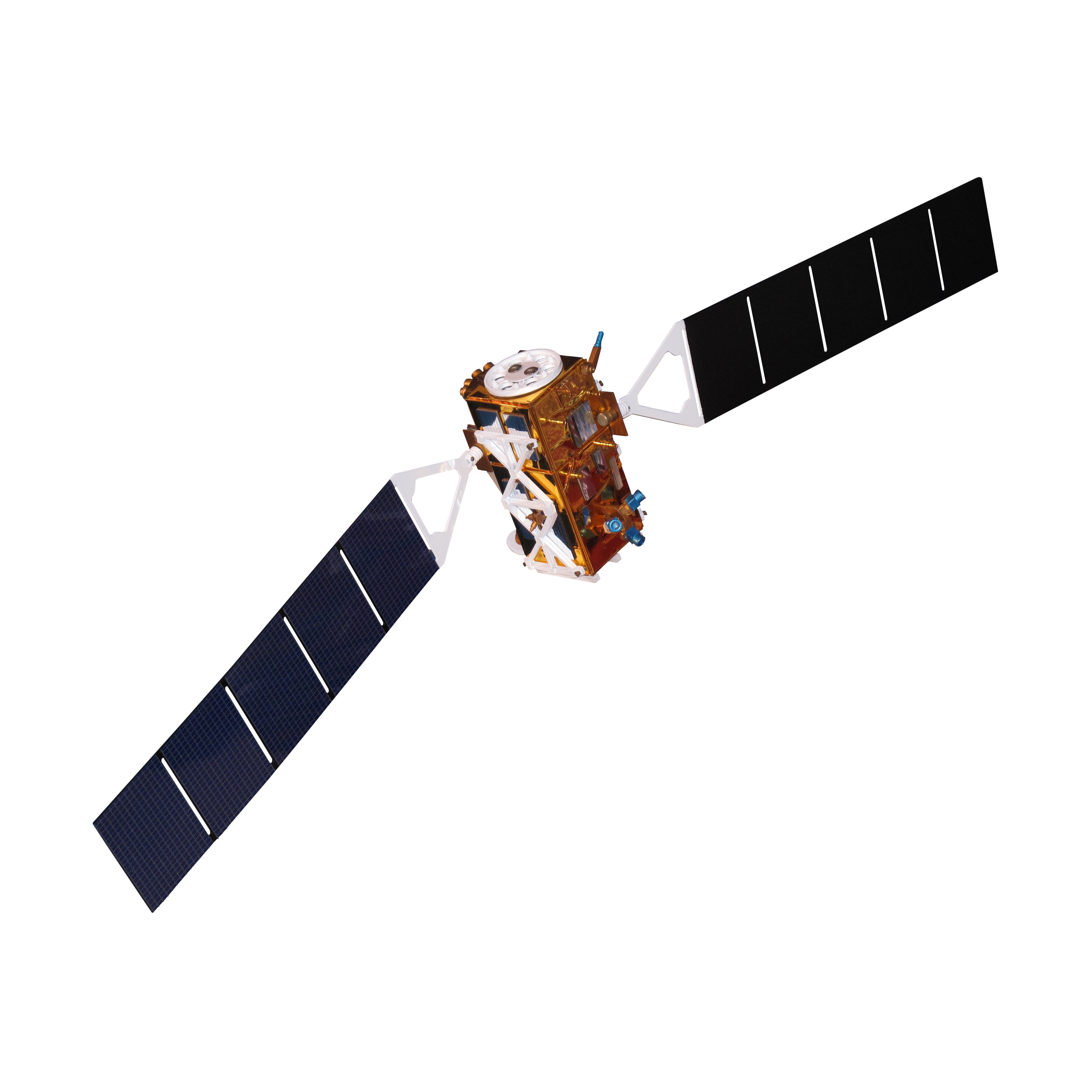
- Sentinel-1 satellite (radar antenna missing)
- Mission type: Earth observation
- Operator: ESA
- COSPAR ID: 2025-251A
- SATCAT no.: 66315
- Website: Sentinel-1 (ESA)
- Mission duration: Planned: 7 years 1 year, 4 days (in progress)

Spacecraft properties
- Spacecraft type: Sentinel-1
- Bus: Prima
- Manufacturer: Thales Alenia Space; Airbus Defence and Space
- Launch mass: 2,164 kg (4,771 lb)

Start of mission
- Launch date: 4 November 2025, 21:03 UTC
- Rocket: Ariane 62 (VA265)
- Launch site: Kourou ELA-4
- Contractor: Arianespace

Orbital parameters
- Reference system: Geocentric
- Regime: Low Earth
- Altitude: 693 km

Sentinel-1D is a European radar imaging satellite launched in November 2025. It is the second of two additional satellites, and the fourth satellite overall, in the Sentinel-1 constellation, part of the European Union's Copernicus programme for Earth observation. The satellite is equipped with a C-SAR sensor, capable of providing high-resolution imagery regardless of weather conditions. It is designed to replace Sentinel-1A, which had been in orbit for 11 years at the time of Sentinel-1D's launch, long beyond its planned mission duration. Sentinel-1D works in tandem with Sentinel-1C, orbiting 180° apart.

== Applications ==
Like the other Sentinel-1 satellites, Sentinel-1D uses its radar to capture high-resolution images over land, ice, and sea. These freely accessible data are used in land management and disaster response, e.g. for real-time flood detection and monitoring or hurricane and earthquake damage detection.

The Sentinel-1 satellites can detect ground movement changes in terms of millimetres per year, which is used for monitoring agriculture, construction, or infrastructure like railway networks, as well as for predicting landslides.

Both Sentinel-1D and Sentinel-1C include an Automated Identification System (AIS) instrument for detecting AIS signals from marine vessels in coastal areas and the Arctic. This, combined with ship detection in the satellite's radar images, is used in maritime surveillance for monitoring shipping traffic, as well as oil spills, illegal fishing, and other suspicious maritime activities.

== Timeline ==
Development contract was signed with Thales Alenia Space of Italy in December 2015. In November 2022, the satellite's launch was scheduled for the second half of 2024. In January 2025, ESA signed a contract with Arianespace to launch the satellite in the second half of 2025 on Ariane 6.

In September 2025 the satellite was transported from the cleanroom in Cannes, France, via Turin, Italy to French Guiana by the Ukrainian Antonov Airlines. At the same time, control teams at ESOC in Darmstadt, Germany begun simulations of the Sentinel-1D's Launch and Early Orbit Phase (LEOP). This was the first time an ESOC-operated satellite was launching on Ariane 6.

In early October 2025, the satellite has undergone functional tests at Guiana Space Centre and had its AIS antenna assemblies integrated. The spacecraft Flight Readiness Review took place in mid-October, paving the way for fuelling. By 20 October, the spacecraft was fuelled. On 24 October, it was encapsulated inside its rocket fairing and later placed on top of the Ariane 6 launch vehicle in a launch tower at the Guiana Space Centre for the launch planned for 4 November 2025.

The Ariane 6 flight VA265 with Sentinel-1D lifted off on 4 November 2025 at 21:03 UTC and the satellite was successfully deployed in its planned orbit 34 minutes after launch. After releasing Sentinel-1D, the Ariane 6 upper stage fired its Vinci engine once again to deorbit itself and prevent creation of space debris. The Ariane 6 flight VA265 officially ended on 5 November 2025 at 01:16 UTC. The cost of the launch was €82 million.

The first acquisition of signal from the satellite occurred as planned on 4 November 2025 at 22:22 UTC via Troll Satellite Ground Station in Antarctica. Then, controllers at ESOC deployed the satellite's solar arrays and radar antenna in a 10-hours long deployment sequence. First radar images taken by Sentinel-1D were released on 26 November 2025 during the ESA ministerial council held in Bremen, Germany. The areas covered included northern Germany with the city of Bremen, as well as Antarctica and Tierra del Fuego.

On 1 May 2026, Sentinel-1D completed its in-orbit commissioning phase and became fully operational. This marked the completion of Sentinel-1, the first Sentinel mission, started in 2014 with the launch of Sentinel-1A.

== Gallery ==
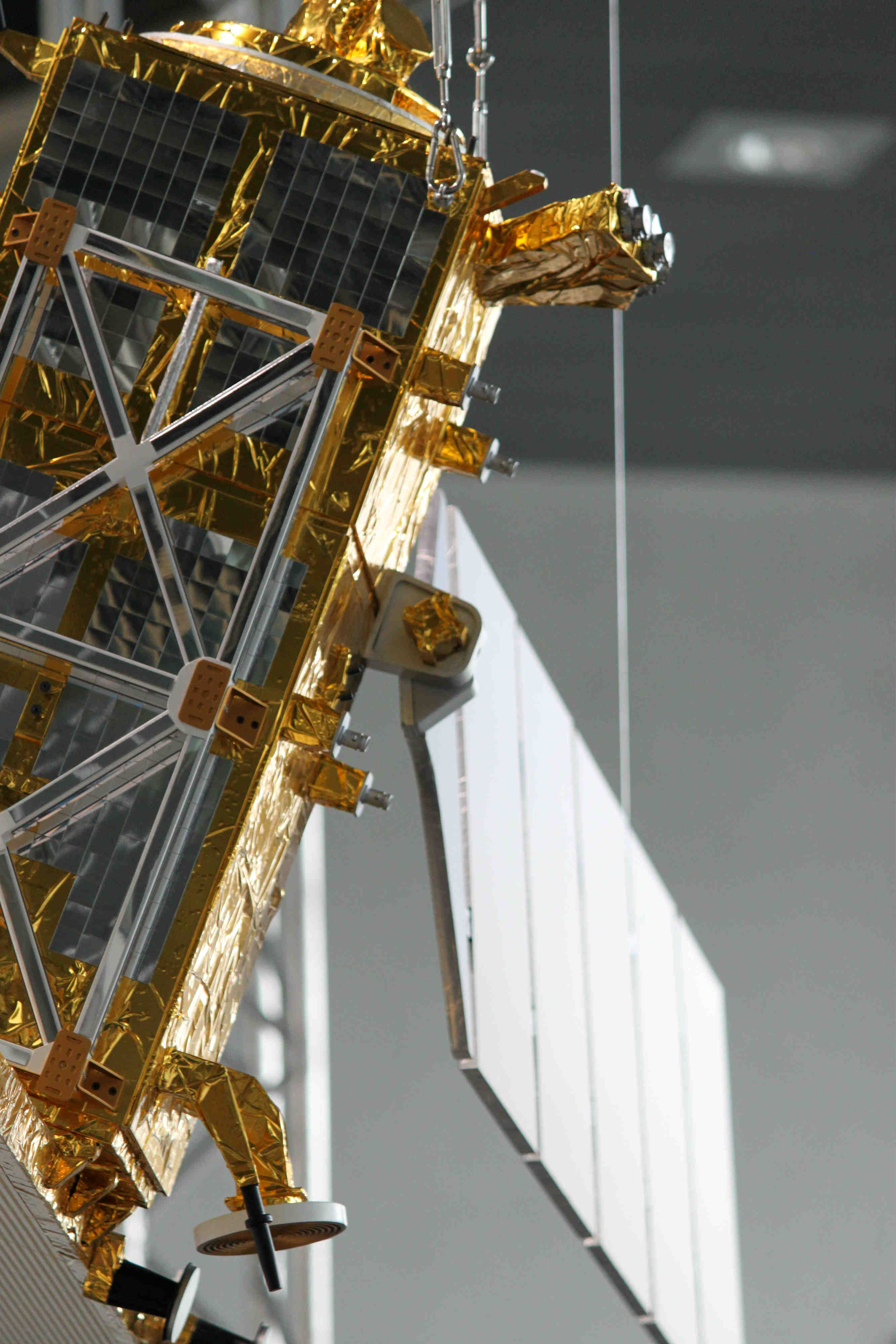
Sentinel-1 scale model

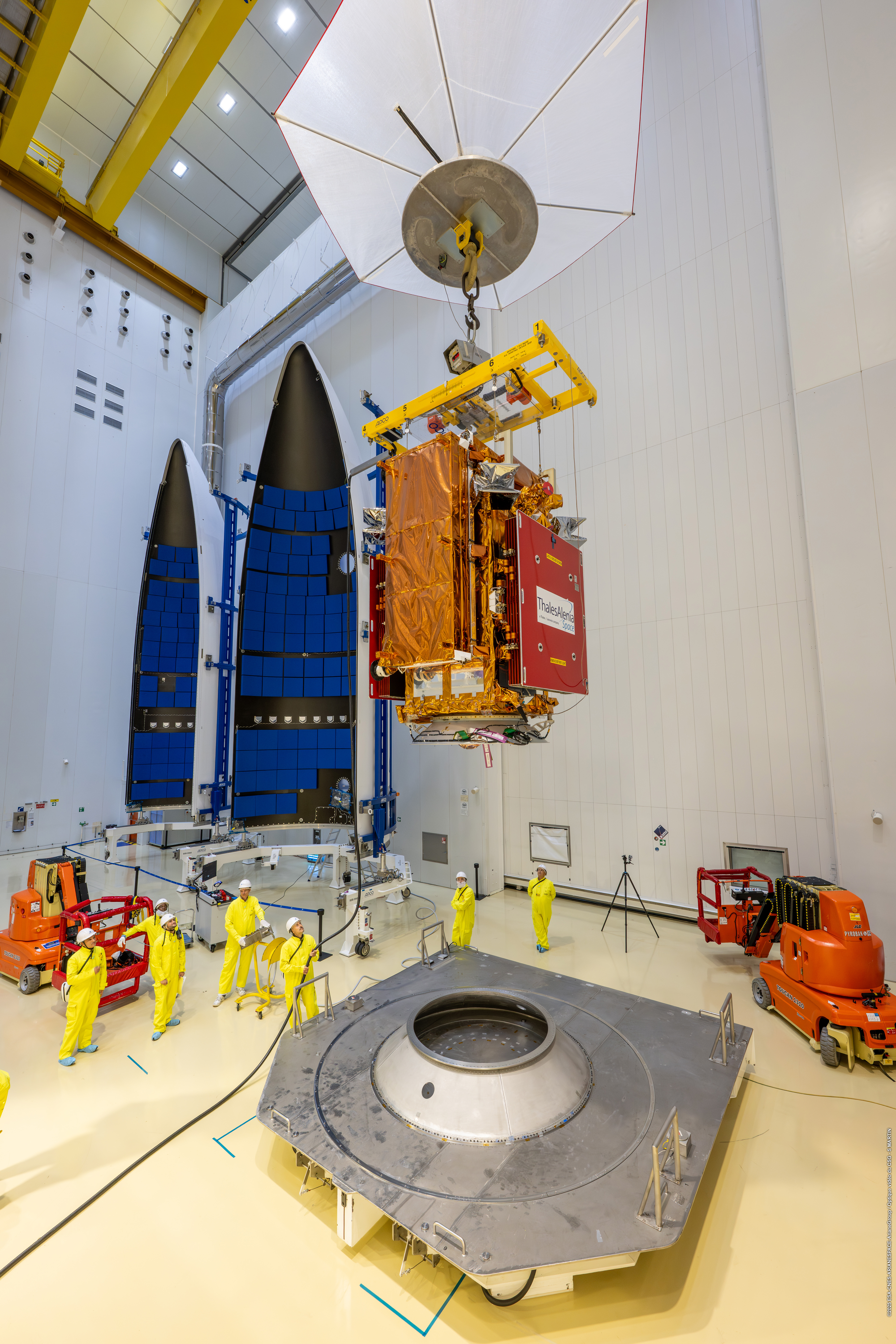
Sentinel-1D being lowered onto Ariane 6 launch adaptor

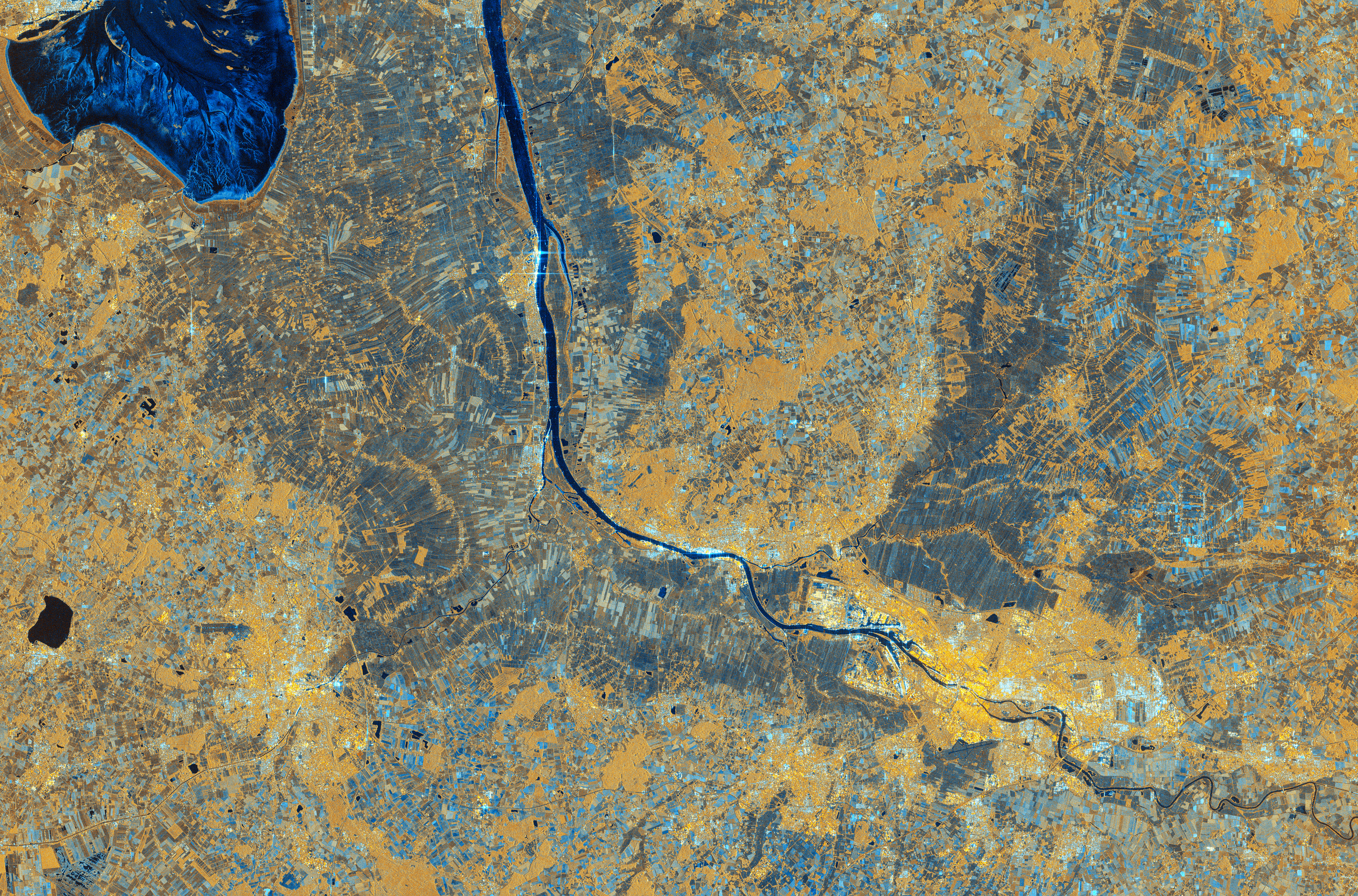
Bremen by Sentinel-1D

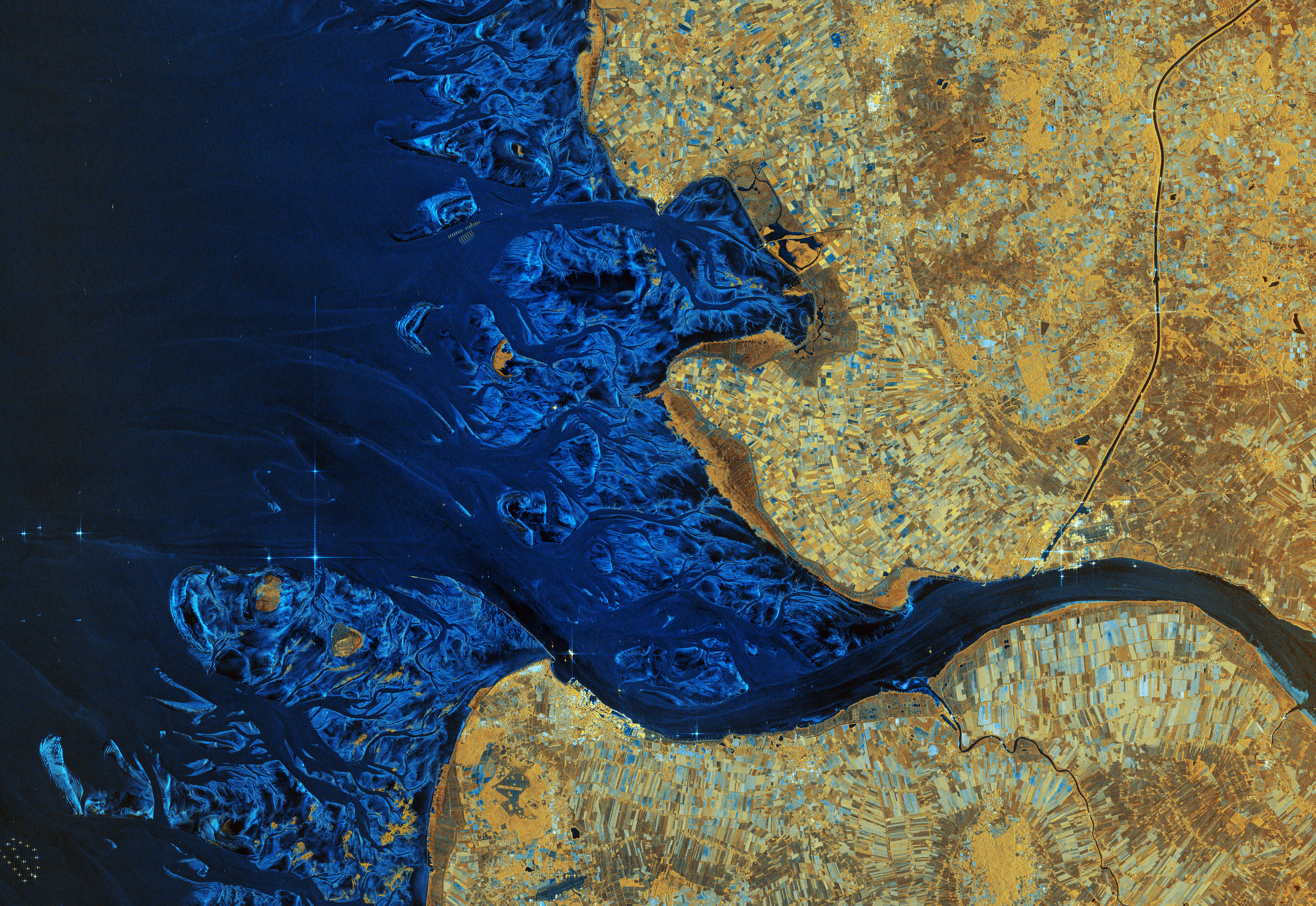
Elbe River delta by Sentinel-1D

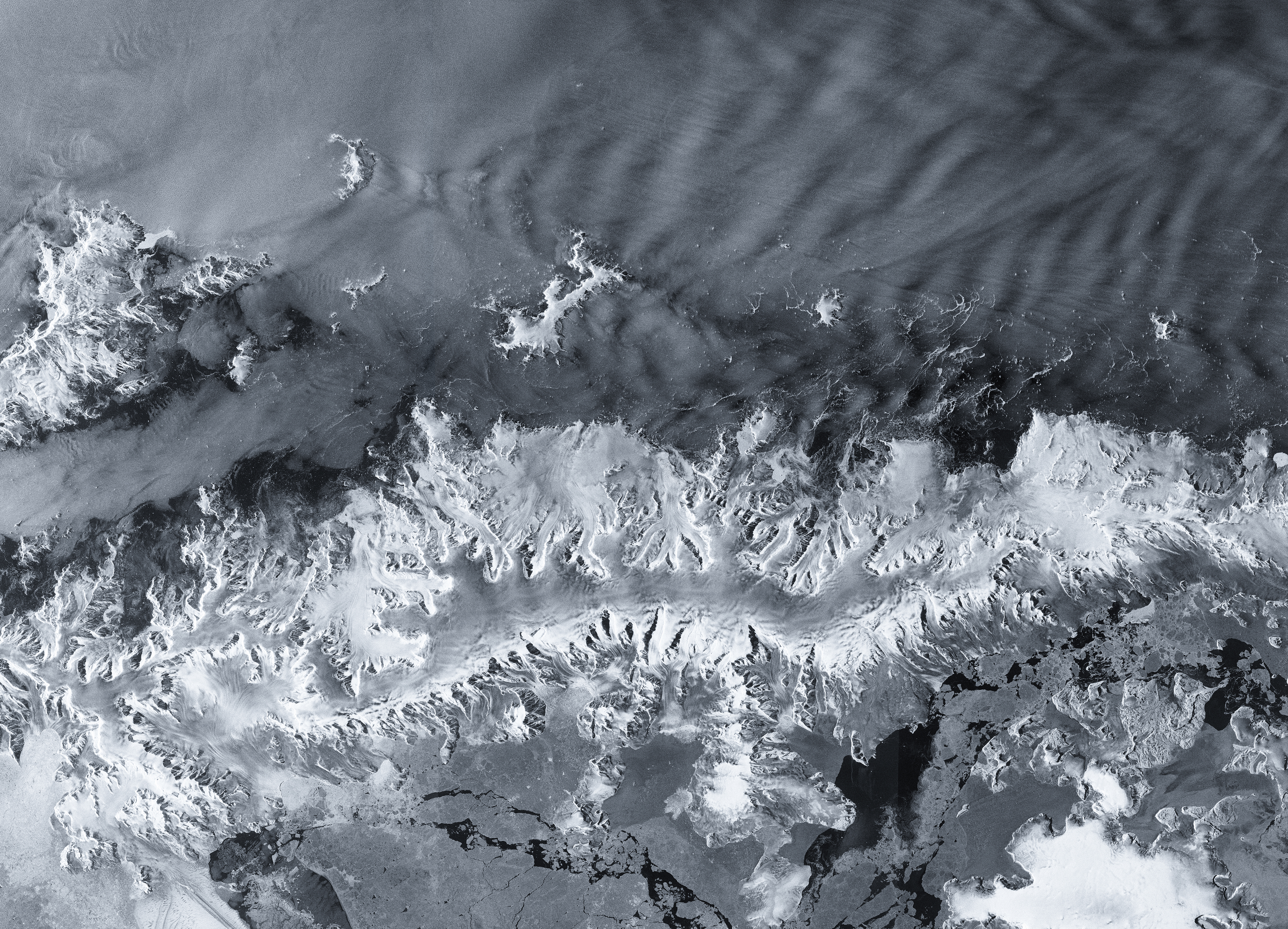
Antarctic Peninsula by Sentinel-1D

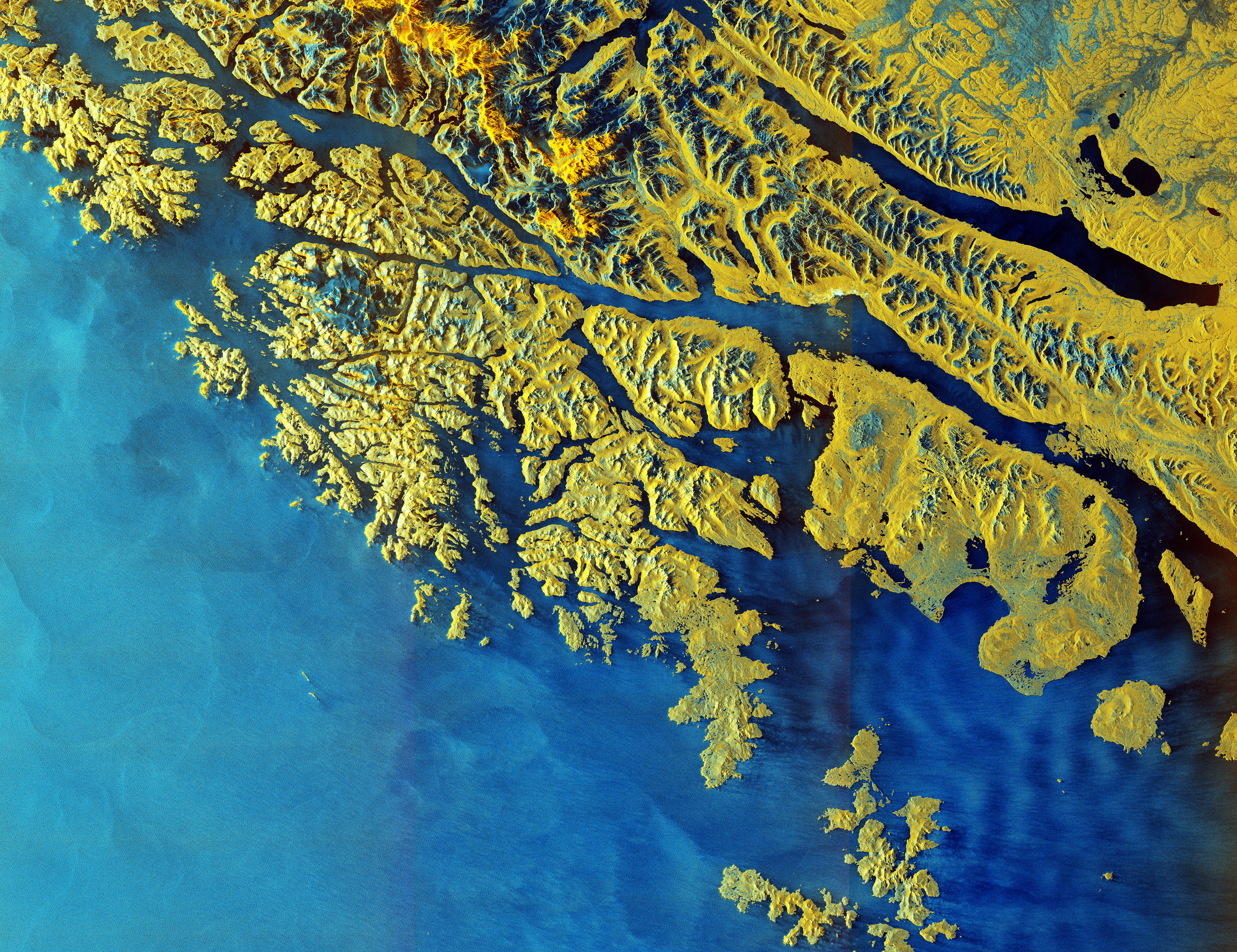
Tierra del Fuego by Sentinel-1D

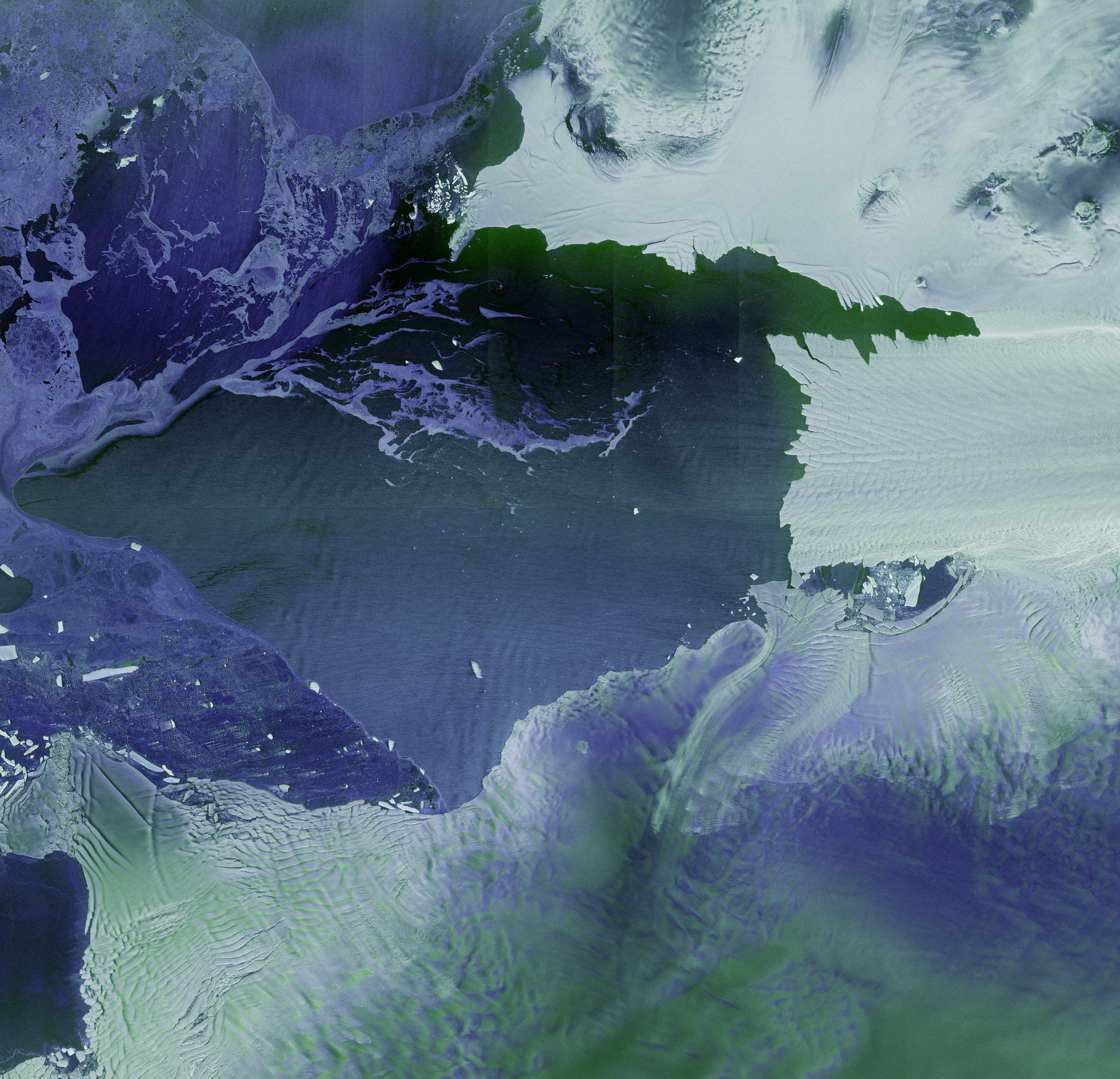
Thwaites and Pine Island glaciers by Sentinel-1D

== See also ==
- 2025 in spaceflight
- List of European Space Agency programmes and missions
