= Project Bromo =

Proposed merger of European space companies

Project Bromo is a proposed merger between three of Europe's largest space companies, Airbus, Thales and Leonardo, with the aim of consolidating their satellite manufacturing and space operations. Aimed at countering increasing global competition and enhancing European space sovereignty, the project seeks for the formation of a new entity by 2027. It was first publicly announced in a memorandum of understanding by the three companies in October 2025.

== History ==
The merger would bring together the space divisions of the three companies, creating a European leader in space operations and satellite manufacturing. Airbus will contribute its Space Systems and Space Digital businesses, which are part of Airbus Defence and Space. Leonardo will contribute its Space Division, including its stakes in Telespazio and Thales Alenia Space. Thales's main contribution will be its shares in Thales Alenia Space, Telespazio and Thales SESO. The new company would employ 25,000 people and generate an annual turnover of 6.5 billion euros right from the start. According to the plans, the new company's headquarters are set to be established in Toulouse, next to the Airbus headquarters. Airbus will hold a slightly larger share in the new company than its partners, with a 35 per cent stake; the Italian group Leonardo and the French firm Thales will each hold 32.5 per cent.

Discussions about a potential merger between three of the largest European space corporations have been ongoing for years, but they gained momentum in 2024 when both Airbus and Thales Alenia Space reported significant losses in their satellite businesses. The project, which aims to merge the most important stakeholders in a strategically important field to create a European champion, is modelled on the missile manufacturer MBDA, which is jointly owned by Airbus, Leonardo, and BAE Systems. It is often cited as an attempt to compete with SpaceX in satellite manufacturing and operation.

== Criticism ==
The proposed merger is subject to approval by the European Commission, which has previously blocked similar consolidation projects.

Following the announcement, German satellite manufacturer OHB criticised Project Bromo, warning that it could lead to a de facto monopoly in certain areas of the European space market. German media outlets have also raised concerns about French influence over the project, noting that the French state holds shares in both Airbus and Thales.
