= Space radar =

Space radar may refer to:

- The United States Space Surveillance Network, which uses radar to track objects in space
- Space-based radar, the use of radar systems mounted on satellites; also, a proposed constellation of active radar satellites for the United States Department of Defense that would allow detection and tracking of aircraft, ocean-going vessels and potentially land vehicles from space
