= Telespazio Germany =

Aerospace company

- Type: Private joint venture
- Industry: Aerospace
- Founded: 1978; 48 years ago
- Headquarters: Darmstadt, Germany
- Key people: Sigmar Keller (CEO)
- Services: Software and systems engineering
- Owner: Telespazio
- Number of employees: Approx. 400
- Website: www.telespazio.de

Telespazio Germany, a subsidiary of Telespazio – a Leonardo and Thales 67:33 joint venture – is a leading company in space systems development and mission operations. Its activities range from the design of cloud-native, mission-control and ground systems to simulations, flight control, payload data processing and astrodynamics. Covering all mission phases, the company leverages its expertise to advance new technologies, specialising in AI, cybersecurity, satellite communications, ATM (air traffic management), training solutions, and drone services. As part of the Telespazio Group – with its network of 4 space centres, 25 operating sites, and presence in 15 countries – the German branch, with more than 400 employees, plays a key role in the space ecosystem.

== Office sites ==
=== Darmstadt (Hessen) ===
Headquarters is near the European Space Operations Centre (ESOC) and the European Organisation for the Exploitation of Meteorological Satellites (EUMETSAT).

=== Gilching (Bavaria) ===
Office site in Gilching, near the German Space Operations Centre(GSOC) in Oberpfaffenhofen/Weßling (Bavaria).

== History ==
On 18 October 1961, Carlo Enrico Martinato, Chairman of Italcable, and Marcello Rodinò di Miglione, CEO of RAI television broadcasting, signed the deed of incorporation of Telespazio, a company with ambitions to take part in satellite telecommunications experiments. Led by Piero Fanti, Telespazio engineers and technicians at Fucino embarked on an adventure that helped open the doors of Space to Italy.

Telespazio Germany was established in 1987 to support the European Space Agency’s (ESA) European Space Operations Centre (ESOC) in Darmstadt. Initially focused on mission operations support, the company has expanded its portfolio to include satellite communication services, engineering consulting, software development, and ground infrastructure integration. Over the years, it has become a strategic partner for several European institutional and commercial space stakeholders.

=== Origins & early years ===
- 18 October 1961 – Founded in Rome by Italcable, STET, the CNR, and Italy’s Post & Telecommunications Ministry to pioneer Italian satellite telecommunications.
- 1962 – Agreement with NASA to test Telstar and Relay satellites; the Fucino Space Centre began operations, receiving the first Telstar signals.
- 1963–1964 – First satellite TV transmissions from Fucino via Telstar; initiated Intelsat partnership.
- 1969 – Assisted in distributing live broadcast of the Apollo 11 Moon landing to Europe.

Expansion in the 1970s & 1980s

- 1974 – Partnered with NASA on Landsat program and contributed to Sirio, Italy's first telecom satellite (launched 1977).
- 1977 – Launched a second space center in Gera Lario, Lombardy.
- 1983 – Established Matera Space Center for geodesy under CNR/ASI.
- 1987 – Opened a satellite communications center in Scanzano, Palermo.
- 1987 – Founded Telespazio Germany

Strategic moves & satellite programs (1990s–2000s)

- 1991 – Launched ARGO, Italy’s first emergency communication network.
- 1994 – Set up Telespazio Argentina.
- 1996 – Oversaw BeppoSAX scientific satellite launch and operations.
- 1997 – Telespazio name reinstated.
- 1998 – Acquired German GAF AG and formed joint venture in Romania (Rartel).
- 2001 – Launched SICRAL 1, Italy’s first military communications satellite.
- 2002 – Integrated into Finmeccanica (now Leonardo); involved in COSMO-SkyMed program.
- 2003 – Acquired GAF AG to boost Earth observation services.

Transformation into Franco–Italian Joint Venture

- 1 July 2005 – Merged with Alcatel’s space services; formed the “Space Alliance”; Telespazio became 67% Finmeccanica, 33% Thales.
- April 2006 – April 2007 – Thales acquired Alcatel’s stake, finalizing the joint ownership.

Consolidation & international growth

- 2005 – Space Alliance officially launched.
- 2007 – First COSMO-SkyMed satellite launched; Telespazio built ground segment.
- 2008 – Launched Galileo test satellite GIOVE-B; managed initial operations.
- 2009 – SICRAL 1B launched; Telespazio handled ground, launch, and testing; signed Göktürk‑1 contract.
- 2010 – Spaceopal (Telespazio‑DLR joint venture) won Galileo operations contract; inaugurated Galileo Control Center in Fucino.

Strategic acquisitions & expansion

- 1 January 2011 – Acquired UK-based VEGA Space and Elsag Datamat's space units.
- June 2012 – Aurensis in Spain rebranded as Telespazio Ibérica after Telespazio acquired full ownership in 2008.

Recent era (2010s–2020s)

- Launched Copernicus Sentinel‑1 satellite (2014) and continued involvement in Rosetta, Gaia, Agile cosmic gamma-ray programme.
- Supporting Galileo and Earth observation missions, plus lunar-orbit communications under ESA’s Moonlight program.
- February 2021 – Celebrated 60th anniversary; release of book Space to the Future; photographic events; recapped milestones and future goals.

== Business Areas/ Markets ==
=== Satellite Communications (SatCom) for remote operations ===
Telespazio Germany specialises in satellite communications and providess SatCom solutions for a range of applications. The company acts as an independent, vendor-neutral system integrator and supports public sector institutions, private enterprises, and international organisations with customised satellite communication networks.

Its services span system architecture, design, integration, and long-term operation of non-terrestrial communication systems, including Low Earth Orbit (LEO), Medium Earth Orbit (MEO), and Geostationary Orbit (GEO) satellites. These systems are used as primary or backup communications for operations in remote, mobile, or high-security environments. Telespazio Germany's solutions are widely adopted across industries such as telecommunications, public safety, defence, energy, logistics, and retail.

The company also supports hybrid SatCom-terrestrial networks and contributes to research and deployment of next-generation communications infrastructure in Europe. It maintains strategic collaborations with leading satellite operators, manufacturers, and institutional bodies such as ESA and EUMETSAT.

Its main SatCom offering:

- Starlink: LEO solution with global coverage thanks to approximately 7000 satellites in low Earth orbit at 550 km. Telespazio Group is an authorized reseller and partner for Starlink Business Services in Germany and Europe.
- Iridium: LEO solution with global coverage thanks to a constellation of 66 satellites in low Earth orbit at approximately 780 km altitude. Telespazio, as a Tier 1 Partner of Iridium, can directly provide and integrate Iridium’s satellite communication solutions, ensuring high-quality connectivity for critical and mobility applications worldwide.
- Iridium PTT: Push-to-Talk (PTT) is a range of mobile satellite solutions offering worldwide coverage for voice, SMS, data, and Internet communications. It is particularly suitable for organisations in need of primary or backup communication links.
- Oneweb: LEO solution with global coverage thanks to 650+ satellites in low Earth orbit at approximately 1,200 km. Telespazio is OneWeb’s Italian partner and official reseller in Europe. Since 2019, Telespazio has been providing hosting services for OneWeb at its teleports in Scanzano, Italy, and since 2022 in Maricá, Brazil.
- Konnect VHTS: GEO solution with European coverage provided by a single satellite positioned at 2.7° East, operating in the Ka-band with a capacity of 500 Gbps. Telespazio is the exclusive distributor for Eutelsat Konnect VHTS for the Defense and Government markets across the entire coverage area except for Italy, Spain, and Portugal
- Viasat: GEO solution with coverage across most of the U.S. through satellites in geostationary orbit. Telespazio can directly provide and integrate Viasat’s satellite communication solutions.
- SES MEO: MEO solution with global coverage thanks to a constellation of satellites in medium Earth orbit at approximately 8,000 km altitude. Telespazio can directly provide and integrate SES MEO’s satellite communication solutions.

=== Space ===
Telespazio supports its partners by developing new ground segment solutions, operational concepts, and training techniques.

The company’s heritage lies in the institutional space market in Europe, working primarily with the European Space Agency (ESA), EUMETSAT, and various national space agencies. Over the past decades, Telespazio has provided support throughout the complete mission lifecycle, offering solutions in real-time operations, operations engineering, mission planning, and control systems.

Drawing on extensive experience in ground systems and operations, Telespazio has also collaborated with commercial space ventures since the early stages of the New Space sector. These ventures include projects related to mega-constellations of small satellites, reusable sub-orbital and orbital launchers, future commercial space stations, space debris removal solutions, in-orbit manufacturing of satellites, and deep-space exploration, among others.

Telespazio's EASE suite, provides space sector stakeholders with a modular and flexible digital platform designed to monitor various phases of satellite missions, including ground segment, space segment, and data access. EASE-Rise it is a cloud-based platform accessible globally and aims to offer a user-friendly functionality.

Its main offering:

- Mission planning systems: Telespazio Germany designs and provides mission planning solutions that support the full lifecycle of space missions.
- Simulations: The company develops advanced simulation tools to model and test spacecraft behaviour and operations.
- Astrodynamics engineering: Telespazio Germany offers expertise in orbital mechanics and trajectory design for both near-Earth and deep-space missions.
- Ground station: It supplies and operates ground station systems to enable reliable communication between space and Earth.
- Spacecraft operations: Telespazio Germany supports real-time spacecraft monitoring, control, and operations throughout missions.
- Payload data ground segment: The company delivers solutions for managing and processing payload data from satellites and space instruments.
- Monitor & control: Telespazio Germany provides systems for monitoring and controlling complex space infrastructures and ground assets.
- Human spaceflight services: The company supports human spaceflight through astronaut training, ISS operations, and crew assistance.
- Deep space missions: Telespazio Germany contributes to deep space exploration with mission support, robotic operations, and scientific instrumentation.

=== Cybersecurity for space infrastructure ===
Its main cybersecurity services:

- Ground segment security design: Development of secure architectures for ground infrastructure supporting space missions.
- Security Operations Centre (SOC) specification and design: Definition and design of SOCs tailored to space mission needs
- Security Operations Centre tools selection, deployment, and configuration: Support in choosing, implementing, and configuring SOC tools.
- Security Operations Centre operations: Delivery and management of SOC services for continuous mission protection.
- Space applications and protocols vulnerability assessment: Identification and analysis of security weaknesses in space-related applications and protocols.
- Space missions threat analysis: Assessment of threats specific to space missions and related assets.
- Security service and asset management: Management of security services and mission-critical assets.
- Representative space mission environment in cyber range: Creation of realistic mission environments for cybersecurity training and testing.
- Network security design and implementation: Design and deployment of secure communication networks for space operations.
- Cloud and data security: Protection of cloud-based infrastructures and mission data.

=== Artificial intelligence (AI) integration in space missions ===
Telespazio Germany is increasingly integrating artificial intelligence (AI) into its solutions, aiming to enhance automation, efficiency, and decision-making in space operations. The company is positioning itself as a key contributor to Europe’s AI capabilities in the space sector, securing contracts such as the "AI for OPOS" (AI for Operational Procedures Optimisation and Support) project funded by the European Space Agency. Through initiatives like this, Telespazio Germany develops AI-based systems to optimize operational procedures, reduce manual workload, and improve reliability across space mission operations.

=== Civil and military aviation: Drones, training and air traffic management ===
Telespazio Germany provides engineering and operational services that contribute to the safety, efficiency, and modernization of civil and military aviation across Europe. The company works with air navigation service providers (ANSPs), airports, and aviation organizations, supporting major European air traffic management initiatives.

Its solutions include:

- Training solutions: Telespazio Germany designs, develops, and delivers training systems for aviation professionals, including air traffic controllers and technical personnel. These solutions cover both classroom-based and simulator-supported training to ensure operational readiness and compliance with international standards.
- Drone detection: The company provides technologies and services to detect, classify, and track unmanned aerial vehicles (UAVs) in controlled and sensitive airspace. Their main solution, DIDIT, enhances airspace security by enabling early warning and response to unauthorized drone activity.
- Air traffic management (ATM): Telespazio Germany supports the development, integration, verification, validation, and operational support of ATM systems aimed at improving the safety and efficiency of European airspace. The company contributes to modernization programs that enhance coordination, capacity, and environmental performance.
- Communication, navigation, and surveillance (CNS): Support for CNS infrastructure to enable safe and efficient airspace management, including satellite-based navigation solutions.
- Unmanned aerial systems (UAS) integration: Contributions to the safe integration of drones and other unmanned systems into controlled airspace.
- Flight procedures design and validation: Support for the design and validation of performance-based navigation procedures.
- Support for major aviation programs: Participation in European programs such as the Single European Sky ATM Research (SESAR) initiative, with a focus on modernizing air traffic management.

== Partnerships and Clients ==
GOCE (EE1)	2009
CRYOSAT-2 (EE3)	2010
GALILEO LEOPS	2011 – 2018
METOP-B LEOP	2012
MSG-3 LEOP	2012
GAIA	2013
SWARM (EE4)	2013
SENTINEL-1a	2014
SENTINEL-2a	2015
MSG-4 LEOP	2015
LISA PATHFINDER	2015
IXV	2015
SENTINEL-1b	2016
SENTINEL-3a LEOP & COM	2016
EXOMARS TGO	2016
SENTINEL-5p	2017
SENTNEL-2b	2017
SMALL GEO	2017
METOP-C LEOP	2018
SENTINEL-3b LEOP	2018
AEOLUS (EE5)	2018
BEPI COLOMBO	2018
OPS-SAT	2019
SEOSAT	2020
SENTINEL-6 JCS LEOP	2020
SOLAR ORBITER	2020
SAT-AIS (ESail)	2020
EUCLID	2023
JUICE	2023
EARTHCARE (EE6)	2024
SENTINEL-2c	2024
SENTINEL-1C	2024
HERA	2024
BIOMASS (EE7)	2025

== Parent Company: Telespazio Group ==
Telespazio Germany is part of the Telespazio Group, which operates across more than 15 countries with over 3,000 employees. The group is one of the largest European providers of satellite services, offering navigation, observation, telecommunication, and geoinformation services. Telespazio Group is jointly owned by Leonardo (67%) and Thales Group (33%).

Telespazio Germany collaborates with European and global stakeholders, including:

- ESA (European Space Agency)
- EUMETSAT (European Organisation for the Exploitation of Meteorological Satellites)
- DLR (German Aerospace Center)
- Leading satellite operators and aerospace companies

Its customers include government agencies, defence contractors, energy utilities, telecom operators, logistics companies, and infrastructure providers.

== Missions Supported by Telespazio Germany ==
Mission	Launch Date
EXOSAT	1983
GIOTTO	1985
HIPPARCOS	1989
ULYSSES	1990
ERS-1	1991
EURECA	1992
ISO	1995
ERS-2	1995
CLUSTER-1	1996
HUYGENS	1997
XMM	1999
CLUSTER-2	2000
INTEGRAL	2002
MSG-1 LEOP	2002
ENVISAT	2002
MARS EXPRESS	2003
SMART-1	2003
ROSETTA	2004
CRYOSAT-1	2005
MSG-2 LEOP	2005
GIOVE-A LEOP	2005
VENUS EXPRESS	2005
METOP-A LEOP	2006
GIOVE-B LEOP	2008
ATV	2008 – 2012
COLUMBUS	2008-2014
HERSCHEL	2009
PLANCK	2009
