= Discoverer II =

Canceled space-based radar project

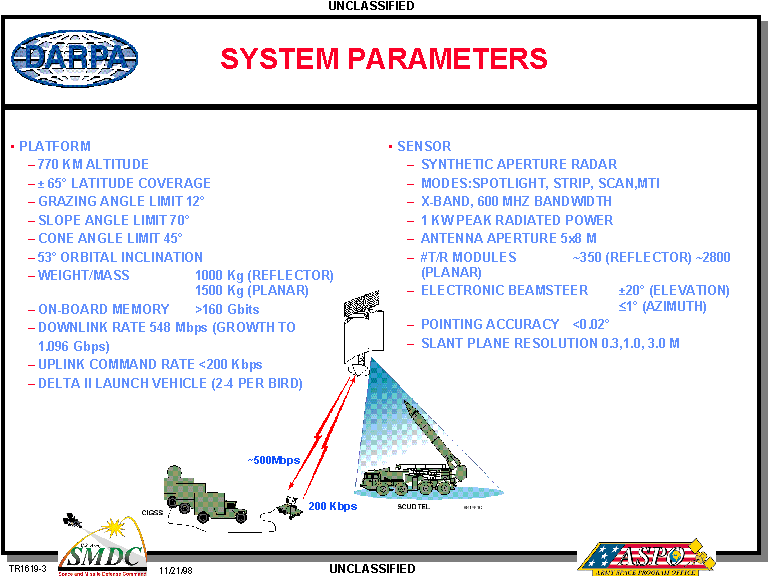
Discoverer II System Parameters, DARPA, 1998

Discoverer II (initially known as STARLITE) was a joint DARPA, Air Force, and National Reconnaissance Office project to build and launch a low Earth orbit (LEO) constellation for space-based radar. The project began in 1998 but was canceled by Congress in 2000.

== History ==
The Discoverer II concept dates back to June 1996, when the Director of Central Intelligence's Small Satellite Review Panel concluded that: "...now is an appropriate time to make a qualitative change in the systems architecture of the nation's reconnaissance assets... We see the opportunity to move towards an operational capability for the country, at least for imagery systems, that consists of an array of smaller, cheaper spacecraft in larger numbers which is at least as useful as those currently planned and to transport them to space with substantially smaller and less costly launch vehicles."

The Defense Science Board (DSB) was then asked to establish a Task Force on Satellite Reconnaissance (the so-called "Hermann Panel") to review all major aspects of such small satellite systems for defence. In its January 1998 report, the Task Force recommended that a modified STARLITE program be initiated, as a "Military Space Radar Surveillance Program," in an effort to achieve broad-area, all-weather, near-continuous radar access that could be integrated with military operations. In February 1998 DARPA, the Air Force and the NRO established a joint program to undertake a "Space-based Radar Risk Reduction and Demonstration Program".

The Discoverer II constellation was envisioned to be 24 satellites, each configured with Synthetic Aperture Radar (SAR) and Ground Moving Target Indication (GMTI) radar systems. Each satellite was envisioned to cost approximately $100 million. The constellation would allow for a very rapid revisit rate (about 15 minutes) to most areas of the earth for near-continuous surveillance of terrestrial and maritime vehicles, and could produce Interferometric SAR images for high-resolution terrain mapping. When needed, constellation tasking could be directed by a deployed Joint Task Force tactical commander.

On February 22, 1999, three contractor teams were selected, led by Lockheed Martin Astronautics, Spectrum Astro, and TRW Defense Systems Division. After a study phase, the project planned to launch two experimental satellites for demonstration and risk reduction. The project apparently suffered difficulties, and was canceled by Congress in 2000.
