= Group on Earth Observations =

Scientific coordination organization

Logo

The Group on Earth Observations (GEO) is a scientific organization that coordinates international efforts to build a Global Earth Observation System of Systems (GEOSS). It links existing and planned Earth observation systems and supports the development of new ones in cases of perceived gaps in the supply of environment-related information. It aims to construct a global public infrastructure for Earth observations consisting of a flexible and distributed network of systems and content providers.

== Concept ==
Common Earth observation instruments include ocean buoys, meteorological stations and balloons, seismic and Global Positioning System (GPS) stations, remote-sensing satellites, computerized forecasting models and early warning systems. These instruments are used to measure and monitor specific aspects of Earth’s physical, chemical and biological systems.

To be useful, the raw data collected must be processed, archived, interpreted, and made available via easy-to-use channels in the form of information comprehensible not only by remote sensing experts. Earth observations are vital for policymaking and assessment in many fields.

GEO focuses on facilitating access to Earth observation data for nine priority areas: natural and human-induced disasters, environmental sources of health hazards, energy management, climate change and its impacts, freshwater resources, weather forecasting, ecosystem management, sustainable agriculture, and biodiversity conservation.

== History and structure ==
GEO was a result of the first ever Earth Observing Summit held in Washington, D.C. in 2003. The Summit event was the result of efforts by NOAA Administrator Conrad Lautenbacher who spearheaded the GEO efforts as part of the Bush '43 Administration. GEO was established formally in February 2005 by the Third Earth Observation Summit in Brussels at the end of a process that started in 2003 with the First Earth Observation Summit in Washington, DC. It was launched in response to calls for action by the 2002 World Summit on Sustainable Development and the Group of Eight (G8) leading industrialized countries. These high-level meetings recognized that international collaboration is essential for exploiting the growing potential of Earth observations to support decision making in an increasingly complex and environmentally stressed world.

GEO is a voluntary partnership of governments and international organizations. It provides a framework within which these partners can develop new projects and coordinate their strategies and investments. As of January 2016, GEO’s membership includes 102 governments including the European Commission. In addition, 92 intergovernmental, international and regional organizations with a mandate in Earth observation or related issues have been recognized as participating organizations (see lists below). Each member and participating organization is represented by a principal and a principal alternate. Members make financial contributions to GEO on a voluntary basis.

GEO is constructing GEOSS on the basis of a 10-year strategic plan from 2016 to 2025. The plan defines a vision statement for GEOSS, its purpose and scope, expected benefits, and eight “Societal Benefit Areas” (disaster resilience, public health surveillance, energy and mineral resources management, sustainable urban development, water resources management, biodiversity and ecosystem sustainability, food security and sustainable agriculture and infrastructure and transport management - with climate as a cross-cutting issue), technical and capacity-building priorities, and the GEO governance structure.

GEO is governed by a plenary consisting of all members and participating organizations. GEO meets in plenary at least once a year at the level of senior officials and periodically at the ministerial level. Members make decisions at the plenary by consensus.

== Participating organizations ==
As of January 2016, there were 143 participating organizations.
