= Radiant Earth Foundation =

US nonprofit organization

Radiant Earth Foundation is an American non-profit organization founded in 2016. Its goal is to apply machine learning for Earth observation to meet the Sustainable Development Goals. The foundation works on developing openly licensed Earth observation machine learning libraries, training data sets and models through an open source hub that support missions worldwide like agriculture, conservation, and climate change. Radiant Earth also works on a community of practice that develop standards, templates and APIs around machine learning for Earth observation. According to scholar David Lindgren, the foundation "serves to make satellite imagery widely accessible and usable for development practitioners".

The Foundation is funded by Schmidt Futures, Bill & Melinda Gates Foundation, McGovern Foundation and the Omidyar network

== See also ==
- Earth Observation – Information about the Earth environment
- Machine learning – Subset of artificial intelligence
- Big data – Extremely large or complex datasets
- List of datasets for machine learning research
