= Sentinel-1B =

European radar imaging satellite

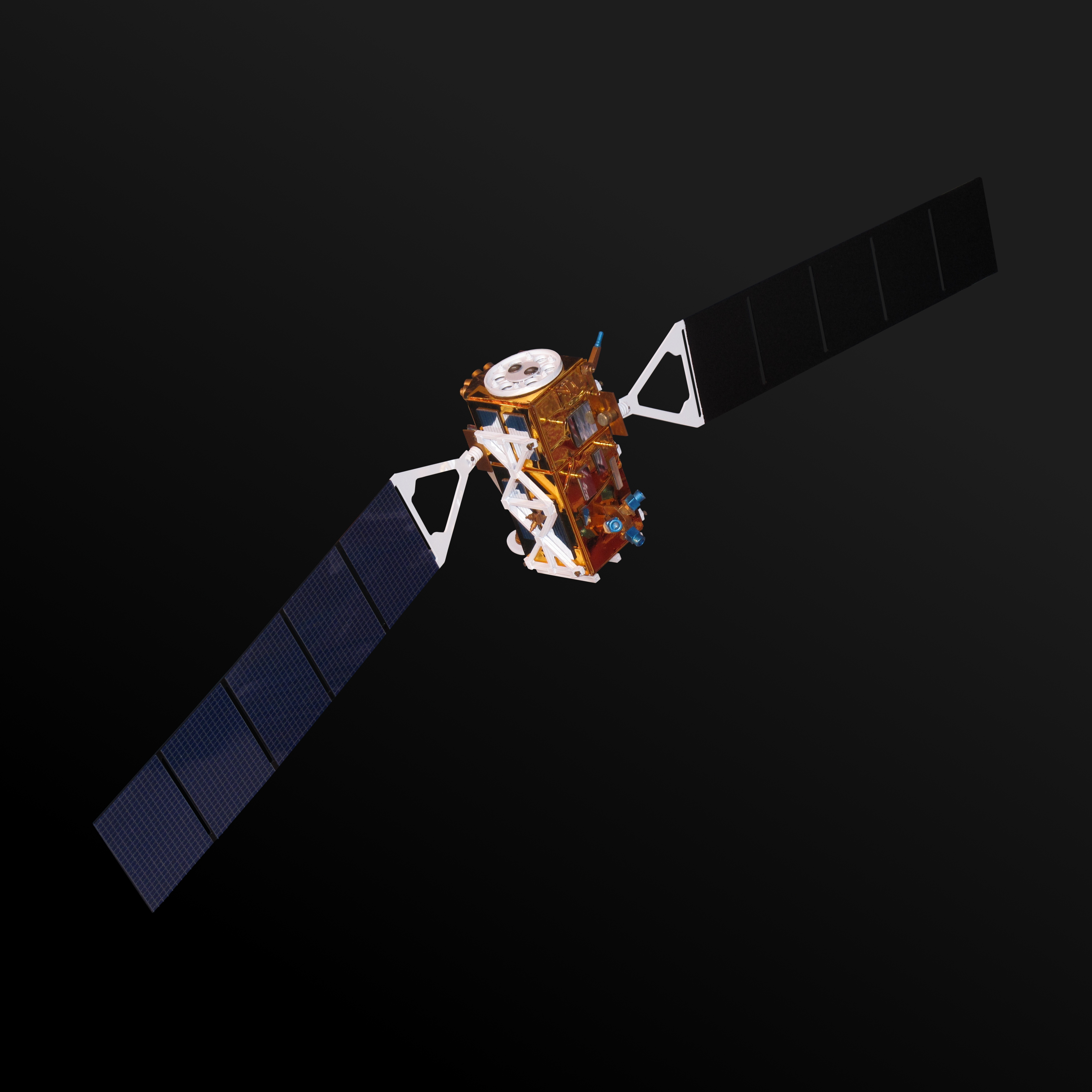
- Model of a Sentinel-1 satellite (with radar antenna missing)
- Mission type: Earth observation
- Operator: ESA
- COSPAR ID: 2016-025A
- SATCAT no.: 41456
- Website: Sentinel-1 (ESA)
- Mission duration: Planned: 7 years Elapsed: 6 years, 3 months, 9 days

Spacecraft properties
- Spacecraft type: Sentinel-1
- Bus: Prima
- Manufacturer: Thales Alenia Space; Airbus Defence and Space
- Launch mass: 2,164 kg (4,771 lb)

Start of mission
- Launch date: 25 April 2016, 21:02 UTC
- Rocket: Soyuz-STA/Fregat-M
- Launch site: Kourou ELS
- Contractor: Arianespace

End of mission
- Disposal: Decaying orbit
- Declared: 23 December 2021
- Deactivated: 3 August 2022

Orbital parameters
- Reference system: Geocentric
- Regime: Low Earth
- Altitude: 693 km

Sentinel-1B was a European radar imaging satellite launched on 25 April 2016. It was the second of two original satellites in the Sentinel-1 constellation, part of the European Union's Copernicus programme on Earth observation. The satellite carried a C-SAR sensor, capable of providing high-resolution imagery regardless of weather conditions.

== History ==
The satellite made its first observation on 28 April 2016, capturing a 250 kilometres (160 mi) wide image of the Austfonna glacier on Svalbard.

Beginning on 23 December 2021, the spacecraft experienced an anomaly which resulted in a loss of data transmission. On 10 January 2022, the European Space Agency confirmed online that a power issue was the root cause of the issue and that initial attempts to fix it had failed. The agency confirmed that efforts to restore the spacecraft's capabilities would continue, before announcing on 3 August 2022 that efforts to recover the mission would end. The power issue disabled the use of the satellite's payload, but otherwise the satellite remains operable, thus allowing ESA to perform a controlled deorbit.

Sentinel-1B was placed into a decaying orbit in April 2024. It will reenter the atmosphere within 25 years.

== See also ==
- 2016 in spaceflight
