= Sentinel-1 =

Earth observation satellite

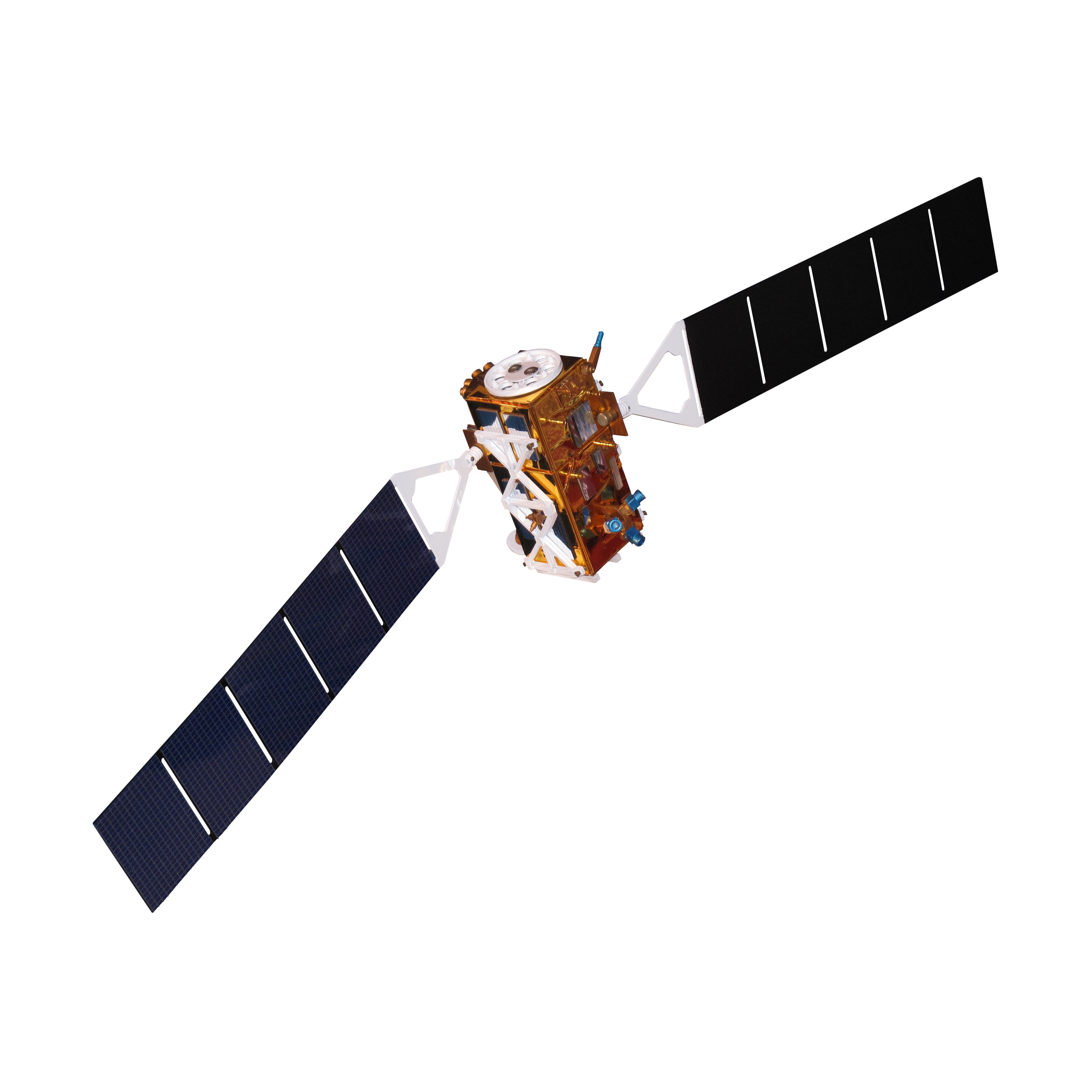
- Model of a Sentinel-1 (radar antenna missing)
- Manufacturer: Thales Alenia Space; Astrium Satellites; DLR; Jena-Optronik
- Country of origin: European Union
- Operator: European Space Agency
- Applications: Land and sea monitoring, natural disasters mapping, sea ice observations, ships detection

Specifications
- Spacecraft type: Satellite
- Constellation: Active: 2
- Launch mass: 2,300 kg (5,100 lb)
- Dry mass: 2,170 kg (4,780 lb)
- Dimensions: 3.9 m × 2.6 m × 2.5 m (13 ft × 8.5 ft × 8.2 ft)
- Power: 5.9 kilowatts (5,900 W)
- Batteries: 324 Ah
- Design life: 7 years (12 years of consumables)

Production
- Status: Active
- On order: 0
- Built: 4
- Launched: 4
- Operational: 3
- Retired: 1
- Maiden launch: Sentinel-1A (3 April 2014)
- Last launch: Sentinel-1D (4 November 2025)

Related spacecraft
- Subsatellite of: Copernicus Programme

Sentinel-1 is the first of the Copernicus Programme satellite constellations for Earth observation operated by the European Space Agency (ESA). Data collected via the satellites are used e.g. for marine and land monitoring, emergency response to environmental disasters, and economic applications.

== Overview ==
The mission was originally composed of a constellation of two satellites, Sentinel-1A and Sentinel-1B, which shared the same orbital plane. Sentinel-1B was retired following a power supply issue on 23 December 2021, which left Sentinel-1A the only satellite of the constellation to be operating, until Sentinel-1C was successfully launched on 5 December 2024. Sentinel-1D launched in November 2025.

The first satellite, Sentinel-1A, launched on 3 April 2014, and Sentinel-1B was launched on 25 April 2016. Both satellites lifted off from the Guiana Space Centre in Kourou, French Guiana on a Soyuz rocket. Sentinel-1D is in development. An equipment failure on Sentinel-1B in December 2021 accelerated work on Sentinel-1C, which has been successfully launched in December 2024.

The satellites have a Sun-synchronous, near-polar (98.18° inclination) orbit. Their orbits have a 12-day repeat cycle and complete 175 orbits per cycle (having a 98.6 minute orbital period). The satellites operate at 693 km (431 mi) altitude, with 3-axis altitude stabilization.

On 10 June 2026, ESA awarded Thales Alenia Space a contract to lead the development and build for two Copernicus Sentinel-1 Next Generation satellites. The new generation will have significantly larger coverage and improved resolution.

The European Space Agency and European Commission's policies makes Sentinel-1's data easily accessible. Various users can acquire the data and use it for public, scientific, or commercial purposes for free.

== Spacecraft ==
=== Sentinel-1A ===
Sentinel-1A was launched on 3 April 2014.

=== Sentinel-1B ===
Sentinel-1B was launched on 25 April 2016. Unavailable due to a power issue since 23 December 2021. Mission end declared on 3 August 2022.

=== Sentinel-1C ===
Development contract signed with Thales Alenia Space of Italy in December 2015. It was launched on 5 December 2024.

=== Sentinel-1D ===
Development contract signed with Thales Alenia Space of Italy in December 2015. It was launched on 4 November 2025.

== Background ==
The prime contractor of the mission is Thales Alenia Space Italy, with whole system integration and also with production of platform Spacecraft Management Unit (SMU) and payload Data Storage and Handling Assembly (DSHA). Other technologies such as the T/R modules, the C-band synthetic-aperture radar antenna, the advanced data management and transmission subsystems, and the on-board computer, were developed in L'Aquila and Milan. The C-SAR instrument is the responsibility of Astrium Gmbh. Sentinel-1A was constructed in Rome, Italy. The ground segment prime contractor is Astrium with subcontractors Telespazio, WERUM, Advanced Computer Systems, and Aresys. Final test verification of the satellite was completed at Thales Alenia Space's clean rooms in Rome and Cannes.

== Instruments ==
Sentinel-1 spacecraft are designed to carry a C-band synthetic-aperture radar (C-SAR) instrument which provides a collection of data in all-weather, day or night, as well as an SDRAM-based Data Storage and Handling Assembly (DSHA).

The single C-SAR instrument with its electronics provides 1 dB radiometric accuracy with a central frequency at 5.405 GHz. This instrument has a spatial resolution down to 5 m (16 ft) and a swath of up to 410 km (250 mi). The data collected in C-SAR was made to be continuous after the termination of a previous mission (Envisat mission).

The DSHA has an active data storage capacity of about 1,443 Gbit (168 GiB), receiving data streams from SAR-SES over two independent links gathering SAR_H and SAR_V polarization, with a variable data rate up to 640 Mbit/s on each link, and providing 520 Mbit/s X-band fixed-user data-downlink capability over two independent channels towards ground.

== Operational modes ==
Sentinel-1 has four operational modes and four types of data products available. All data levels are publicly available for free online within 24 hours of observation. The four operational modes offered by Sentinel-1 are:

- Strip Map (SM) Mode, which features 5-by-5-metre (16 by 16 ft)spatial resolution and an 80 km (50 mi) swath. The sole uses of SM are to monitor small islands as well as emergency management for extraordinary events upon request. Data products are offered in single (HH or VV) or double (HH + HV or VV + VH) polarization.
- Interferometric Wide Swath (IW) Mode, featuring 5-by-20-metre (16 by 66 ft) spatial resolution and a 250 km (160 mi) swath. IW is the main operational mode over land and accomplishes interferometry through burst synchronization. Data products are offered in single (HH or VV) or double (HH + HV or VV + VH) polarization.
- Extra Wide Swath (EW) Mode, featuring 20-by-40-metre (66 by 131 ft) spatial resolution and a 400 km (250 mi) swath. EW is used mainly to monitor wide coastal areas for phenomena such as shipping traffic and potential environmental hazards like oil spills or changes in sea ice. Data products are available in single (HH or VV) or double (HH + HV or VV + VH) polarization.
- Wave (WV) Mode, which features 5-by-5-metre (16 by 16 ft) resolution and a low data rate. It produces 20 by 20 km (12 by 12 mi) sample images along the orbit at intervals of 100 km (62 mi). This is the main operational mode over open ocean, with data offered only in single (HH or VV) polarization.

== Data products ==
The four types of data products offered by Sentinel-1 are:

- Raw Level 0 data
- Processed Level 1 Single Look Complex (SLC) data, which consists of complex images with phase and amplitude of specified areas
- Ground Range Detected (GRD) Level 1 data, which is only systematically distributed multi-looked intensity
- Level 2 Ocean (OCN) data, consisting of systematically distributed data of the ocean's geophysical parameters

== Applications ==
A major goal of the mission was to provide C-Band SAR data. Sentinel-1 provides continuity of data from the ERS and Envisat missions, with further enhancements in terms of revisit, coverage, timeliness and reliability of service. Recently, Sentinel-1 has worked in conjunction with SMAP to help achieve a more accurate measure of soil moisture estimates. Observations from both instruments show them to be complementary of each other as they combine data of soil moisture contents.

A summary of the main applications of Sentinel-1 include:

- Marine monitoring: Sea-ice levels and conditions, oil spills, ship activity, and information about marine winds
- Land monitoring: Agriculture, forestry, and land subsidence
- Emergency response: Flooding, landslides, volcanoes and earthquakes

=== Measuring land subsidence ===
The C-SAR instrument is capable of measuring land subsidence through the creation of interferometric synthetic-aperture radar (InSAR) images. The analysis of phase changes between two or more synthetic aperture radar images taken at different times is able to create maps of the digital elevation and measure the land surface deformation of an area. High spatial (20m) and temporal (6 days) resolutions allow Sentinel-1 to improve on current InSAR techniques and provide systematic continuity to the data.

=== Earthquake monitoring ===
Shortly after the August 2014 South Napa earthquake, data collected by Sentinel-1A was used to develop an interferometric synthetic-aperture radar, or InSAR, image of the affected region. The Sentinel-1 satellites are expected to make analysis of earthquakes using InSAR techniques quicker and simpler.

== Gallery ==
Examples of images produced from Sentinel-1 data.

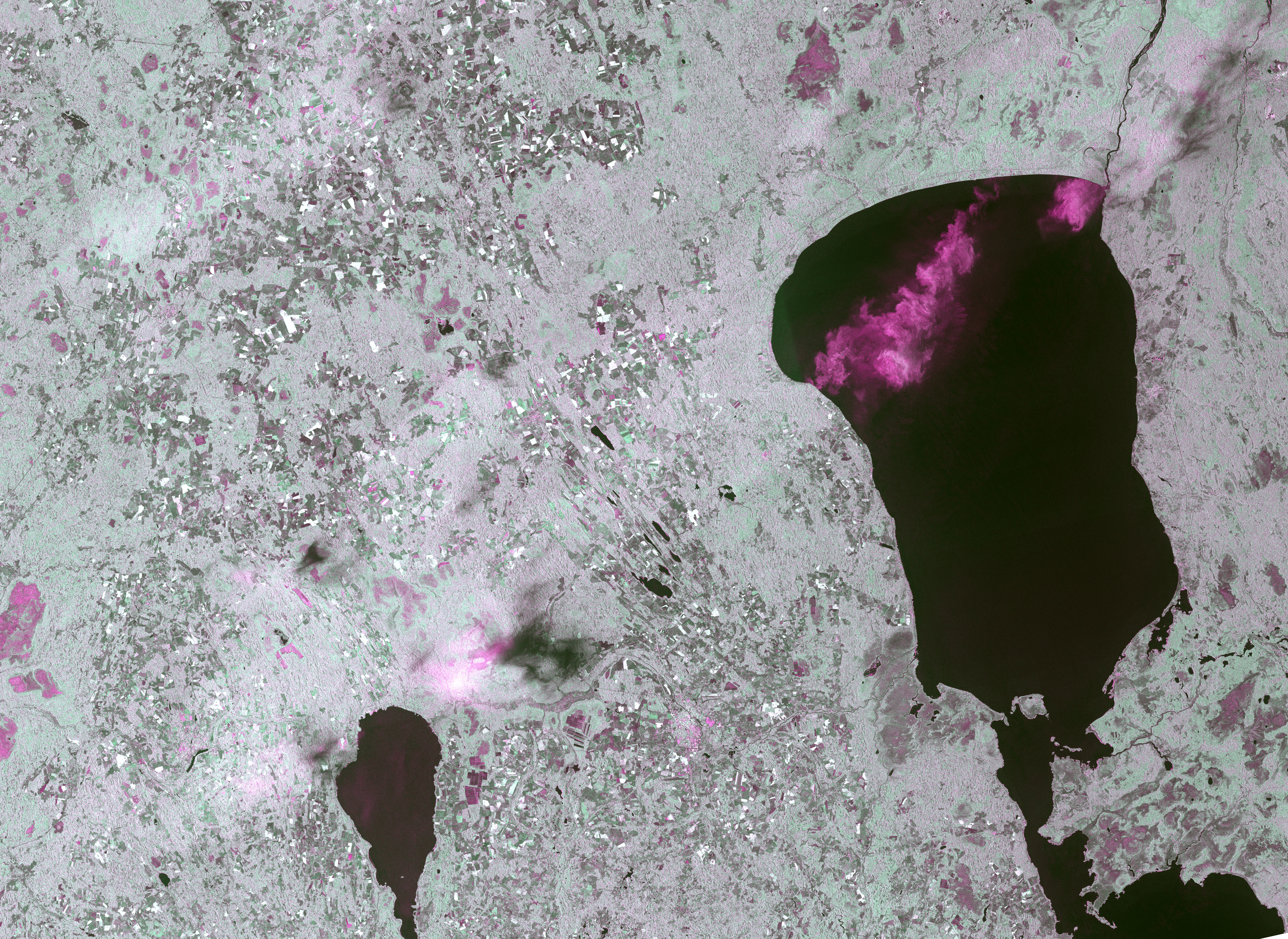
Thunderstorms over Estonia. False colour RGB image of VV-, VH- and VV+VH-polarisation backscatter.

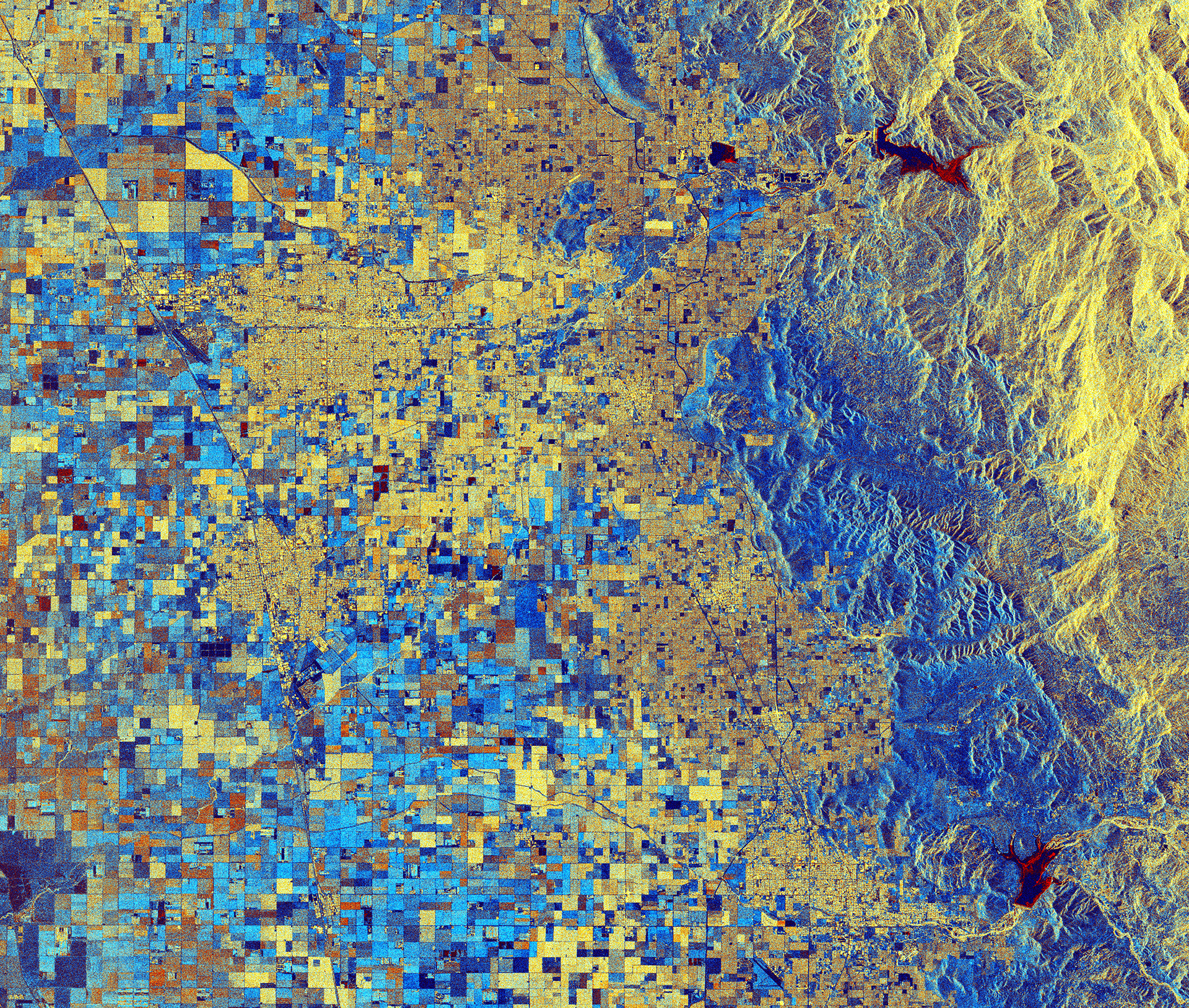
Lake Success region, California. False colour RGB image of scans from two different dates.

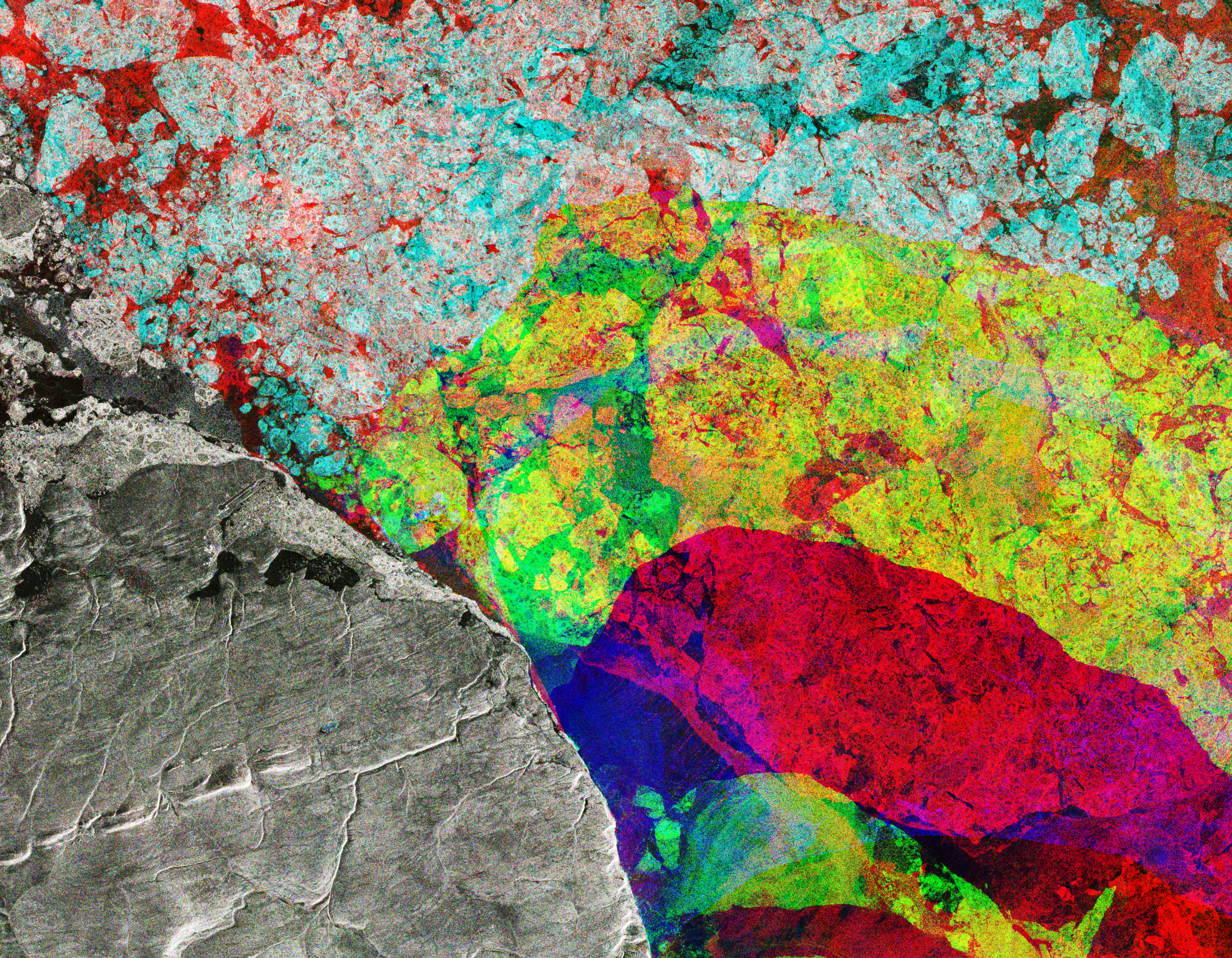
Ice movement in Alert, Canada. False colour RGB image of scans from three different months.

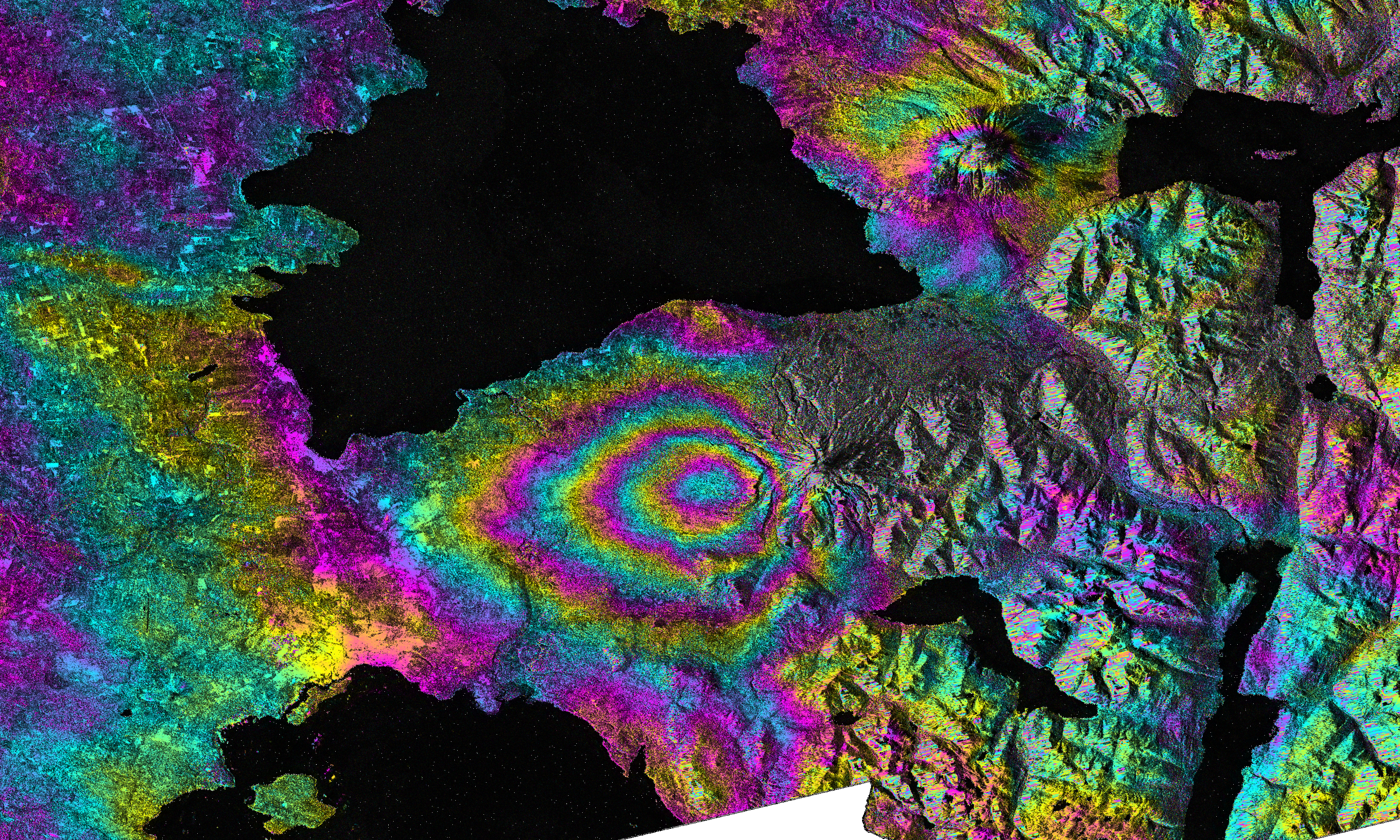
InSAR image displaying the ground deformation after the eruption of Calbuco volcano in Chile.

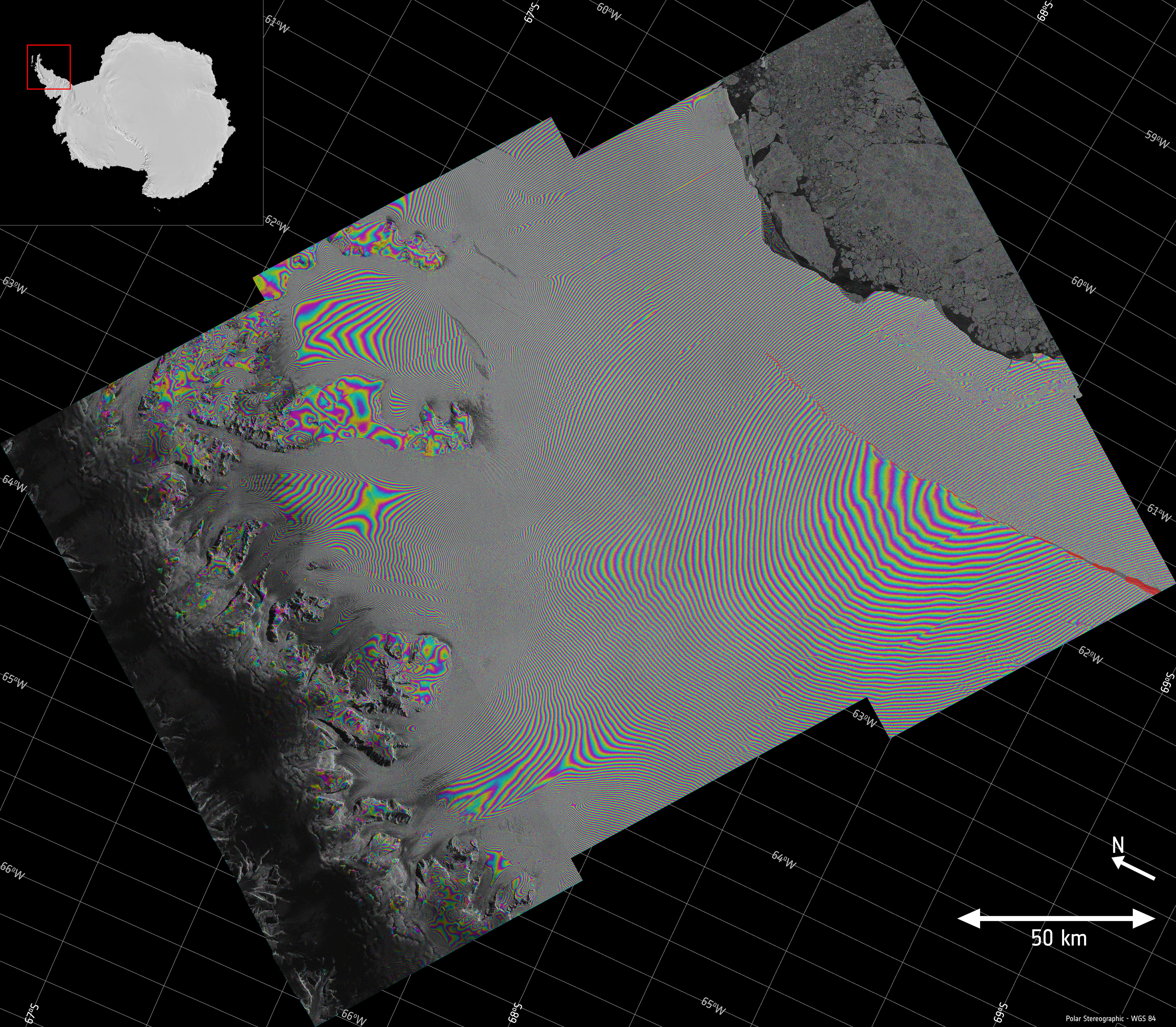
Interferometry reveals a crack in the Larsen Ice Shelf, Antarctica.

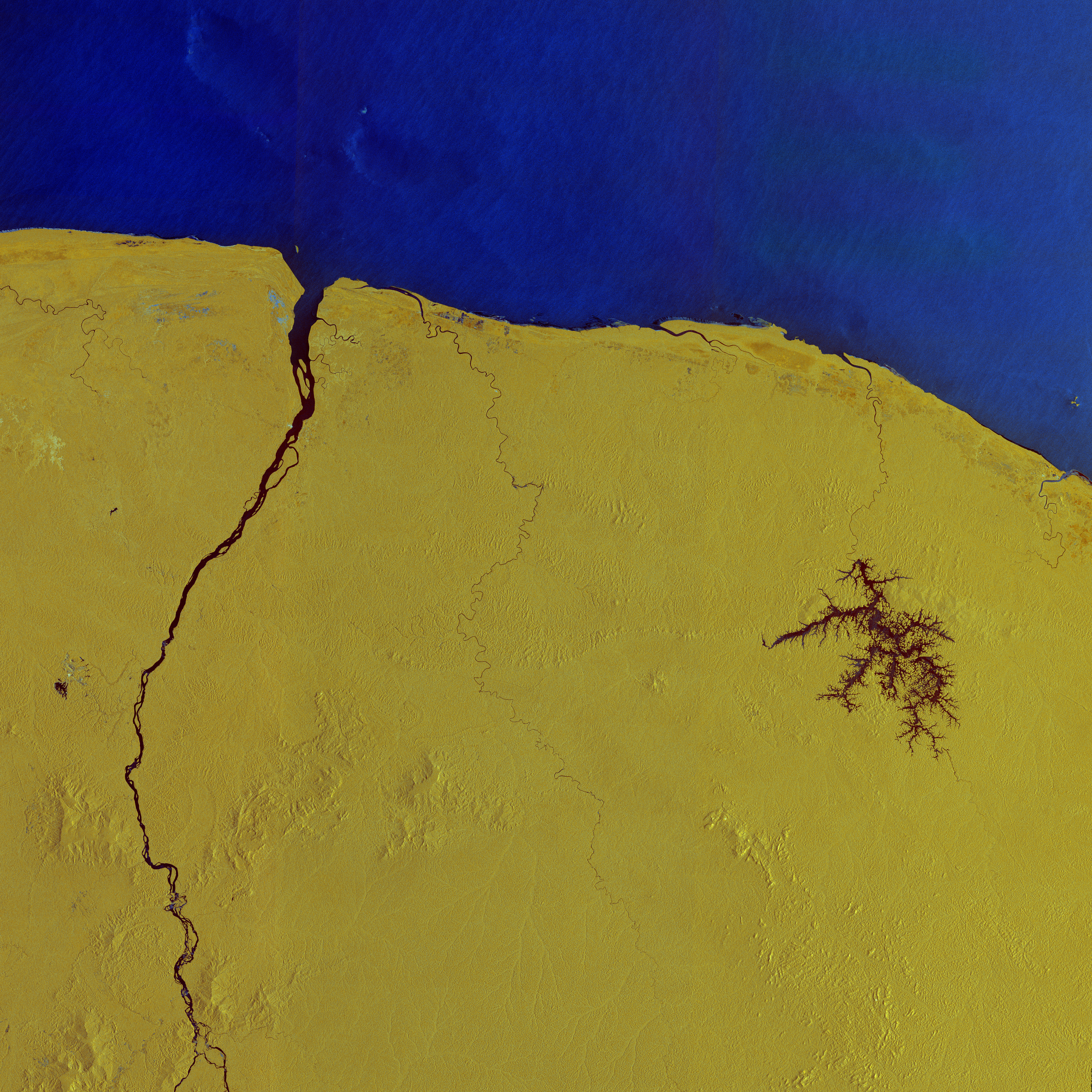
Sentinel-1 captured this radar image over French Guiana – home to Europe’s Spaceport in Kourou, where ESA's Biomass mission was being prepared for liftoff onboard a Vega-C rocket in 2025.

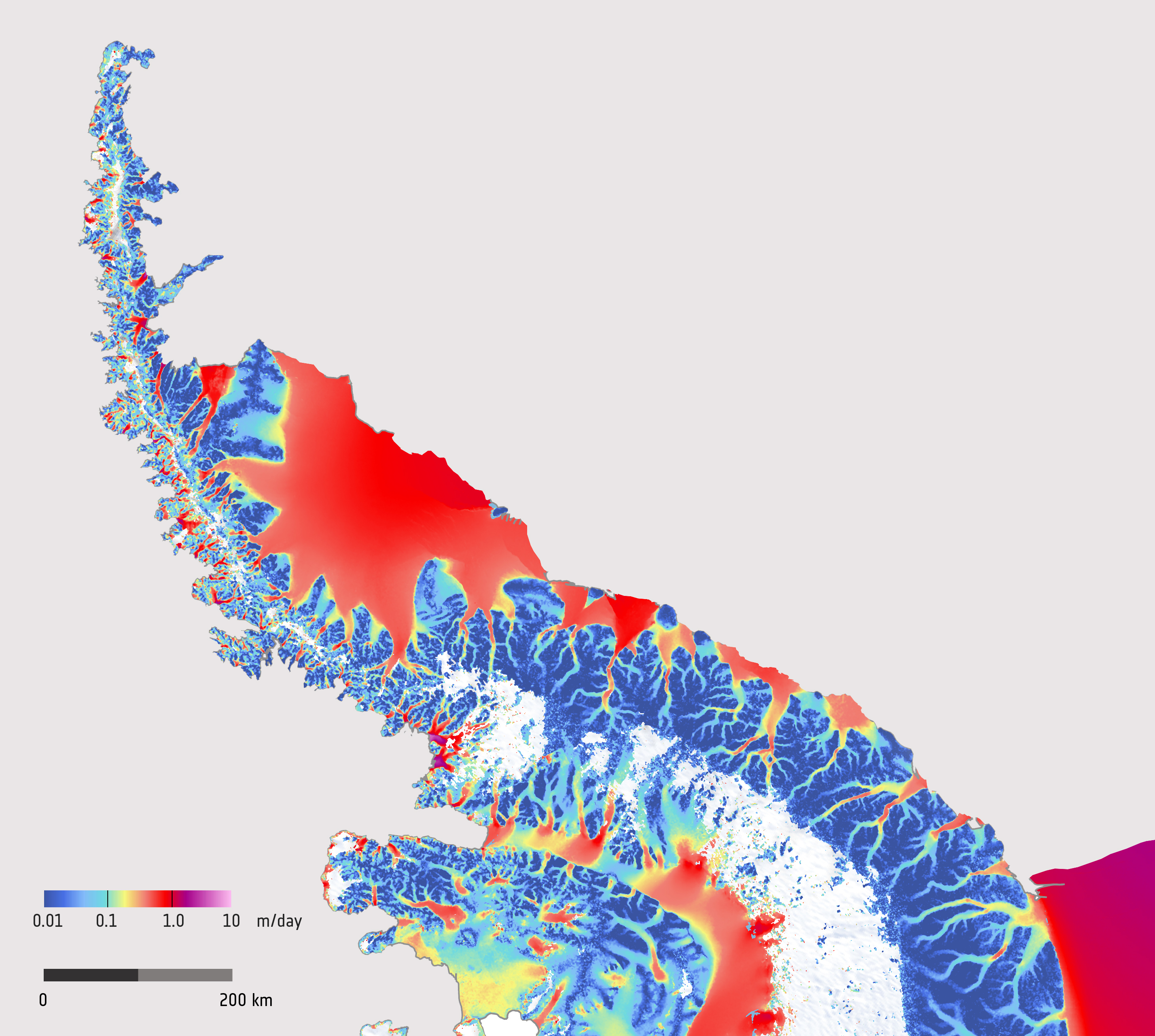
A map showing ice flow speed on the Antarctic Peninsula created from Sentinel-1A data.

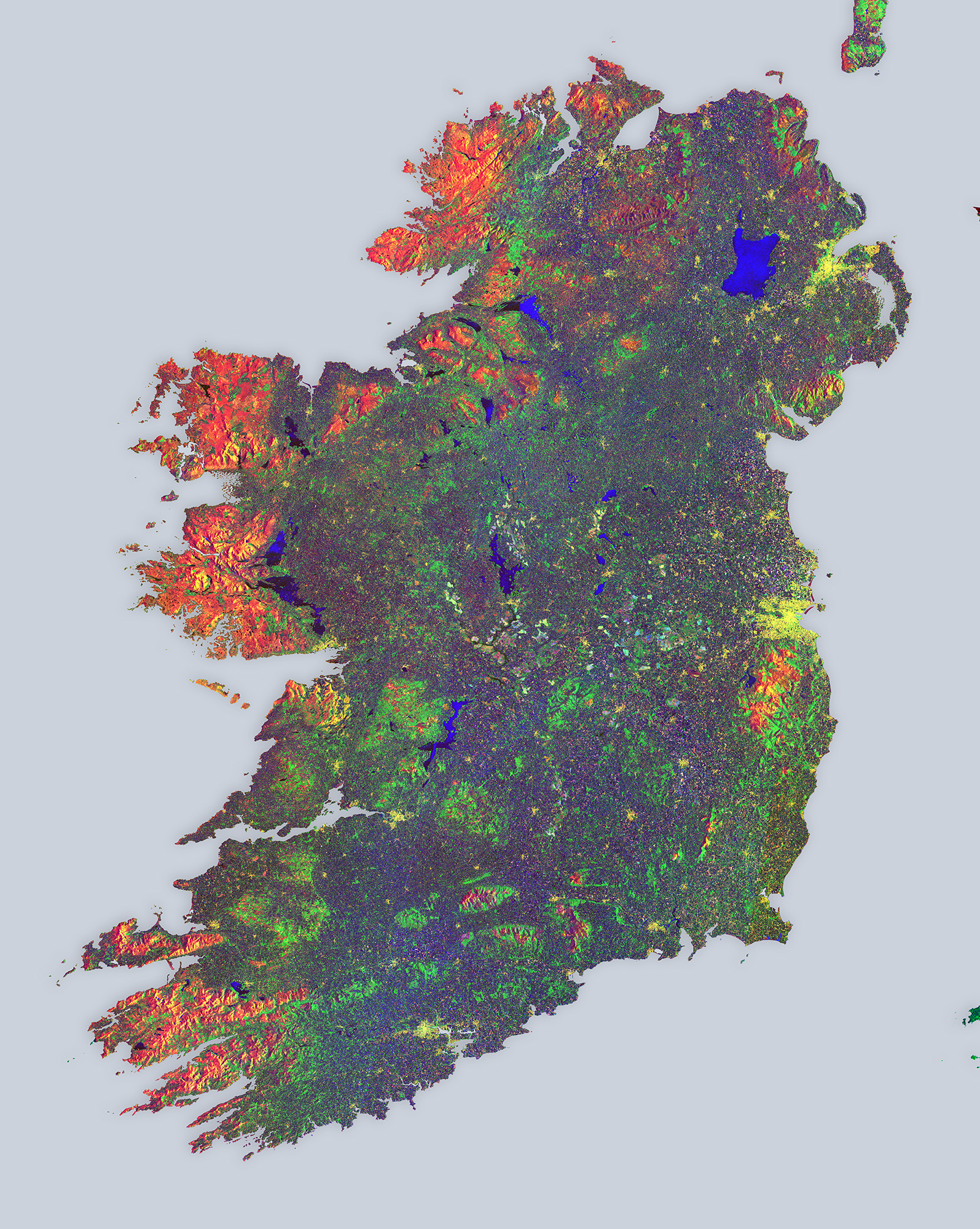
A composite of Ireland's land cover derived from Sentinel-1A data.

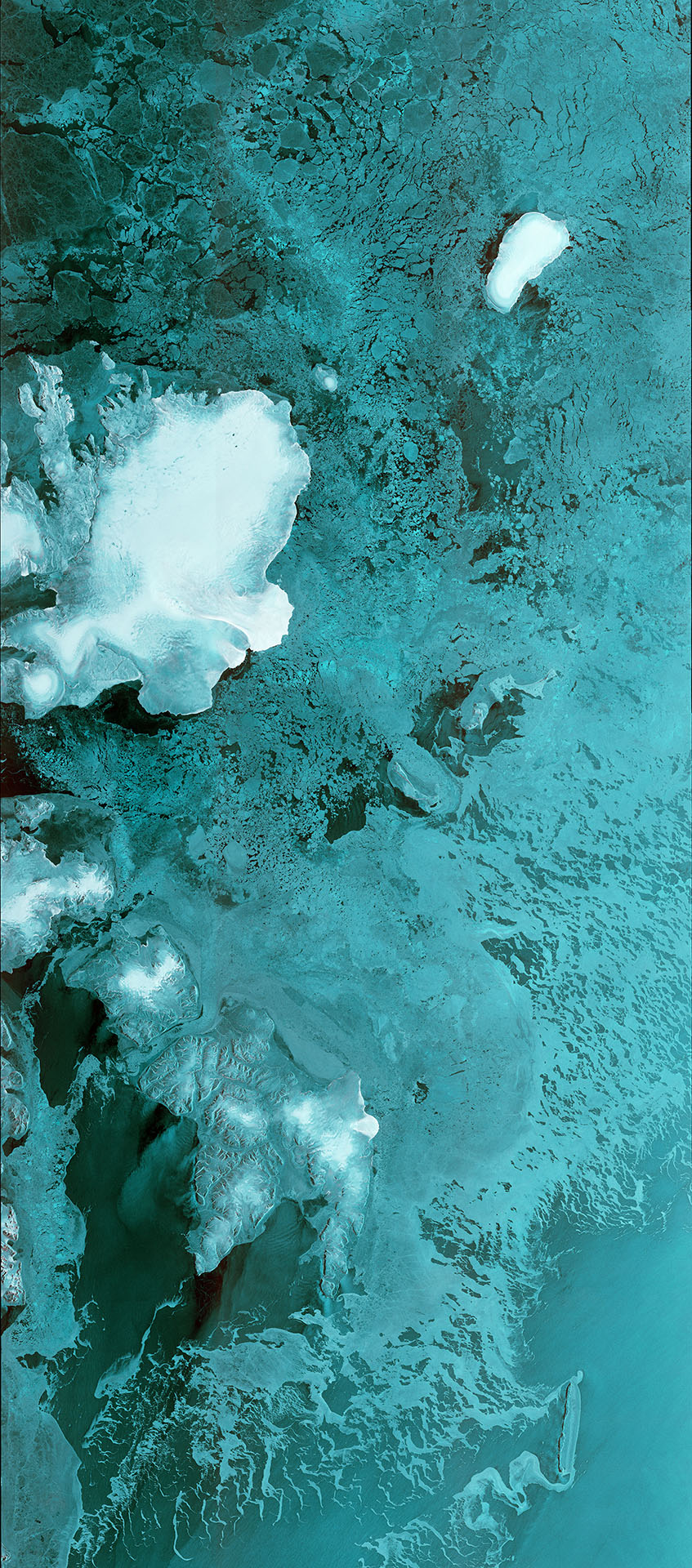
The first data strip acquired by Sentinel-1B over the Barents Sea. The Svalbard archipelago is visible on the left side.
