= Sentinel-1A =

European radar imaging satellite

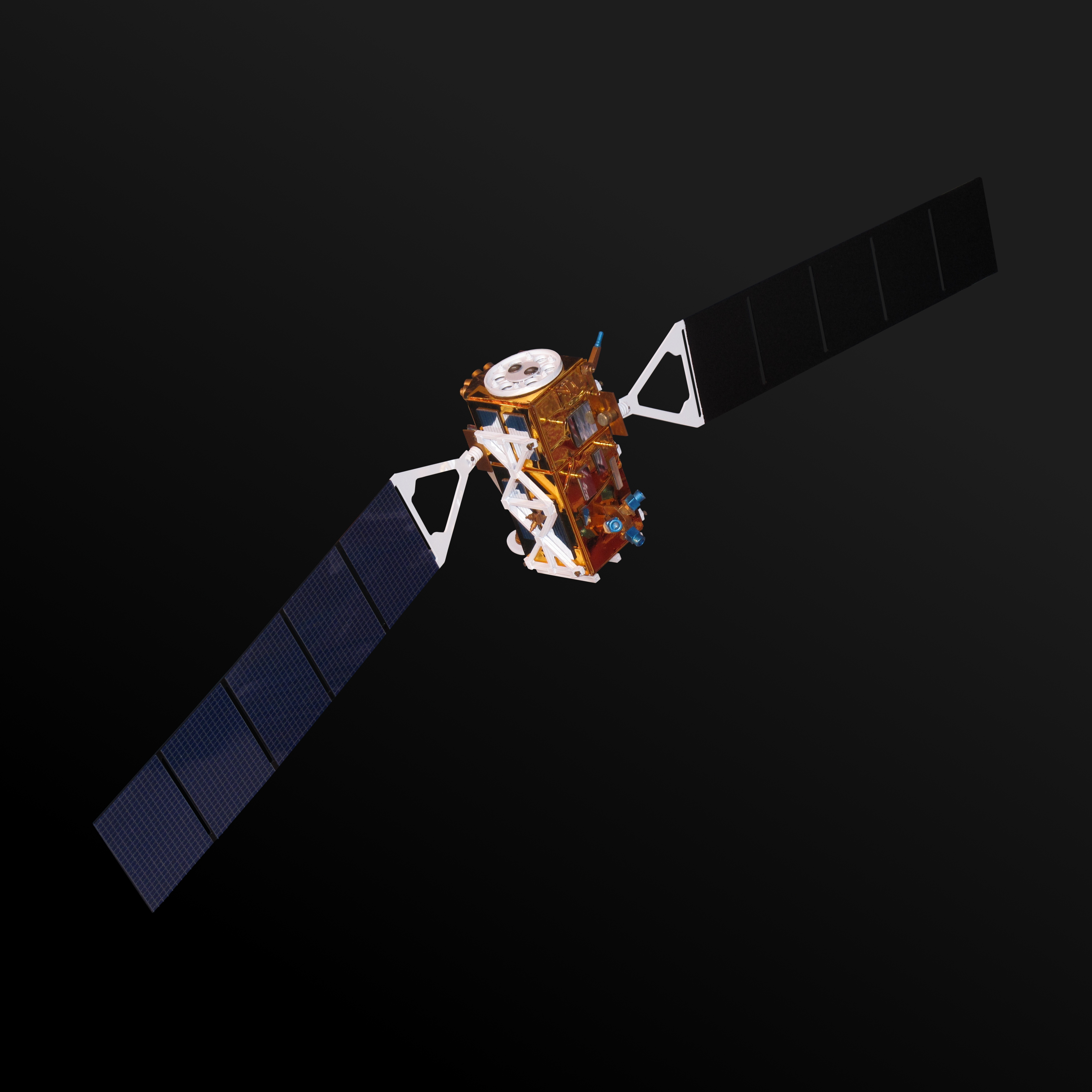
- Model of a Sentinel-1 satellite (radar antenna missing)
- Mission type: Earth observation
- Operator: ESA
- COSPAR ID: 2014-016A
- SATCAT no.: 39634
- Website: Sentinel-1 (ESA)
- Mission duration: Planned: 7 years Elapsed: 12 years, 2 months, 26 days

Spacecraft properties
- Spacecraft type: Sentinel-1
- Bus: Prima
- Manufacturer: Thales Alenia Space; EADS Astrium
- Launch mass: 2,300 kg (5,100 lb)
- Dry mass: 2,170 kg (4,780 lb)
- Dimensions: 3.4 m × 1.3 m (11.2 ft × 4.3 ft)
- Power: 5900 watts

Start of mission
- Launch date: 3 April 2014, 21:02:31 UTC
- Rocket: Soyuz-STA/Fregat
- Launch site: Kourou ELS
- Contractor: Arianespace

End of mission
- Declared: 30 June 2026

Orbital parameters
- Reference system: Geocentric
- Regime: Sun-synchronous
- Apogee altitude: 693 km (431 mi)
- Inclination: 98.18 degrees
- Period: 98.6 minutes
- Repeat interval: 12 days
- Epoch: planned

Transponders
- Band: S Band (TT&C support); X Band and Optical laser through EDRS (data acquisition)
- Bandwidth: 64 kbit/s upload (S Band); 128 kbit/s – 2 Mbit/s down (S Band); 520 Mbit/s down (X Band/Optical)

Sentinel-1A is a European radar imaging satellite launched in 2014 and decommissioned in 2026. It is the first Sentinel-1 satellite launched as part of the European Union's Copernicus programme. The satellite carries a C-band Synthetic Aperture Radar which provided images in all light and weather conditions. It analyzed many phenomena occurring on Earth, from detecting and tracking oil spills and mapping sea ice to monitoring movement in land surfaces and mapping changes in the way land is used.

== Program ==
Copernicus is the long-term European Union Earth observation and monitoring programme. It used to be called GMES (Global Monitoring for Environment and Security) and was established by a Regulation that entered into force in 2014. It is a user-driven programme under civil control. Activities conducted under the programme included the launch of six families of dedicated, EU-owned earth observation satellites and instruments—the so-called Sentinels—and the ramp-up of the 6 Copernicus Services in the fields of atmosphere-, marine-, and land-monitoring, climate change, emergency management, and security. Copernicus data and services are available on a full, open, and free-of charge basis to the public sector, the private sector, scientists, and citizens. The programme provides multi temporal Synthetic Aperture Radar images with a temporal gap of 12 days. This data can, for example, be used for SAR Interferometry. Such data, as well as the outputs of Sentinel 2 missions, can be downloaded from the Sentinel Data Hub.

== Mission history ==
=== Pre-launch ===
Sentinel-1A arrived at its launch site in Kourou, French Guiana on 25 February 2014, ahead of its launch which was at the time planned for 28 March.

=== Launch ===
Sentinel-1A was launched on 3 April 2014 by a Soyuz rocket at 21:02:31 GMT (23:02:31 CEST). The first stage separated 118 seconds later, followed by the fairing (209 s), second stage (287 s) and the upper assembly (526 s). After a 617-second burn, the Fregat upper stage delivered Sentinel into a Sun-synchronous orbit at 693 km altitude. The satellite separated from the upper stage 23 min 29 s after liftoff.

=== Orbital operation ===
At 09:43 and at 11:21 on 5 April 2014 ACRIMSAT was rated as having a high risk of collision (<20m) with the newly launched Sentinel-1A. A 39-second burn of Sentinel-1A during LEOP successfully avoided the collision.

Preliminary data, taken during commissioning, demonstrated the versatility and capability of the imagery produced by Sentinel-1A even before the radar system is fully calibrated. Mapping sea ice to ensure the safe passage of marine vessels, providing data to validate ice loss models and determining the difference between land used for forest, agriculture and urban areas.

Data became available to all system users on 6 October 2014, marking the beginning of Sentinel-1A operational life.

=== European Data Relay System test ===
The satellite was used as part of a in-orbit verification of the ESA European Data Relay System. In 2014, data from the Sentinel-1A satellite in LEO was transmitted via an optical link to the Alphasat in GEO and then relayed to a ground station using a Ka band downlink.

=== Incidents ===
On 31 August 2016, ESA announced they had discovered that a solar panel on the Copernicus Sentinel-1A satellite had been hit by a millimetre-size particle in orbit on 23 August. Thanks to onboard cameras, ground controllers were able to identify the affected area. The satellite's routine operations didn't seem to be altered by the impact, in part due to the solar arrays delivering more power than the satellite needs (so mild damage to them would not lead to power shortages).

=== End of mission ===
Following the successful launch of Sentinel-1D, Sentinel-1A was planned to end its mission on 29 June 2026. On June 30, the mission was concluded after 12 years of service, exceeding the initial 7 years plan.
