= Telespazio VEGA UK =

British space company

Telespazio UK Ltd.
- Company type: Private (Subsidiary of Telespazio)
- Industry: Space
- Founded: 1978; 48 years ago
- Headquarters: Luton, Bedfordshire, UK
- Key people: Sarah Macken (CEO)
- Number of employees: 120 (2023)
- Parent: Telespazio
- Website: telespazio.co.uk

Telespazio UK Ltd. is a British space company based in Luton, Bedfordshire. Founded in 1978 by a small group of engineers at the European Space Operations Centre (ESOC) in Darmstadt, Germany, Telespazio UK presently works with various space agencies, satellite operators and manufacturers around the world. It works with the European Space Agency (ESA) and ESA Centre for Earth Observation (ESRIN) in Rome, Italy, ESOC in Germany, European Space Research and Technology Centre (ESTEC) in Noordwijk, the Netherlands and European Space Astronomy Centre (ESAC) in Madrid, Spain.

Since 1978, VEGA has worked on almost every ESA mission and many other European and international programmes, including Mars Express, the Automated Transfer Vehicle (ATV) for the International Space Station (ISS), the Eumetsat Polar System, and the Ground Segment Development for ADEN.

On 1 January 2011, VEGA Space Ltd became a part of Telespazio, the Rome-based space systems services joint venture between the Italian aerospace and defence group Leonardo and the French defense electronics specialist Thales Group. Telespazio UK is an active member of the UK Space Agency, the trade association for Britain's space industry, and is heavily involved with the International Space Innovation Centre based in Harwell.

== History ==
During 1978, VEGA was established by a small group of engineers at the European Space Operations Centre in Darmstadt, Germany. The company had been setup to fulfil the first operations engineering frame contract, which had been competitively bid for and awarded, to provide satellite operations support for several European Space Agency (ESA) missions. During VEGA's initial years of operation, this contract comprised the bulk of its activity.

During the 1980s, VEGA expanded via several additional programmes, including the award of its first contract with the European Organisation for the Exploitation of Meteorological Satellites (EUMETSAT) during 1986, along with a separate deal to handle ground operations for British space telecommunications company Inmarsat. The company established its first dedicated office in St Albans, Hertfordshire. During 1991, VEGA launched on-site operations at the European Space Research and Technology Centre (ESTEC) in the Netherlands.

During 1992, VEGA became a public limited company following an initial public offering on the London Stock Exchange. In the following year, it started providing support for the ESA's Earth Observation Directorate. During 1994, VEGA was awarded its first contract for a simulation-based training system for the British Aerospace Sea Harrier; it also established a presence at the European Space Astronomy Centre (ESAC).

During 1996, VEGA acquires the automation and control engineering business Selmers. The firm's UK offices were located to Welwyn Garden City, Hertfordshire, in the following year. During 2004, VEGA acquired the German space ground systems specialist Anite Systems GmbH. Three years later, the company reorganised itself into several subsidiaries, VEGA France and VEGA Spain. By this point, according to VEGA's own financial statements, the firm self-classified as a specialist professional services company in the principal markets of Aerospace, Defence and Government.

During 2008, VEGA was itself acquired by the Italian aerospace group Finmeccanica (since rebranded as Leonardo); accordingly, it was delisted from the London Stock Exchange. Initially, the company became a subsidiary of Selex ES with the Finmeccanica Group, but continued to operate under the VEGA brand. However, it was restructured over the following three years, including the creation of VEGA Space Ltd during 2010, and the transfer of VEGA's ownership to Telespazio, a space operations joint venture between Finmeccanica and French defense electronics specialist Thales Group on 1 January 2011.

For decades, VEGA has continued to provide support on the original ESA operations engineering contract, which has been re-tendered every five years. Other programme performed by the company include the provision of various elements, such as the synthetic-aperture radar, for the COnstellation of small Satellites for the Mediterranean basin Observation (COSMO-SkyMed) Earth-observation satellite space-based radar programme, which is funded by the Italian Ministry of Research and Ministry of Defence and conducted by the Italian Space Agency (ASI), intended for both military and civilian use. The company has also supported the Rosetta space probe that performed the first successful landing on a comet.

By the 2010s, activities performed by Telespazio VEGA UK included satellite navigation systems, satellite communications (fixed and mobile), ground-based satellite mission control systems, Earth observation, consultancy services for numerous international space programmes, along with general space engineering and operational activities. During 2018, Luigi Pasquali, Telespazio CEO, declared that the company's long term goal is to capture 10 per secure of the global space market by 2030.

In 2021, Telespazio VEGA changed its name to Telespazio UK.
