= Sentinel-1C =

European radar imaging satellite

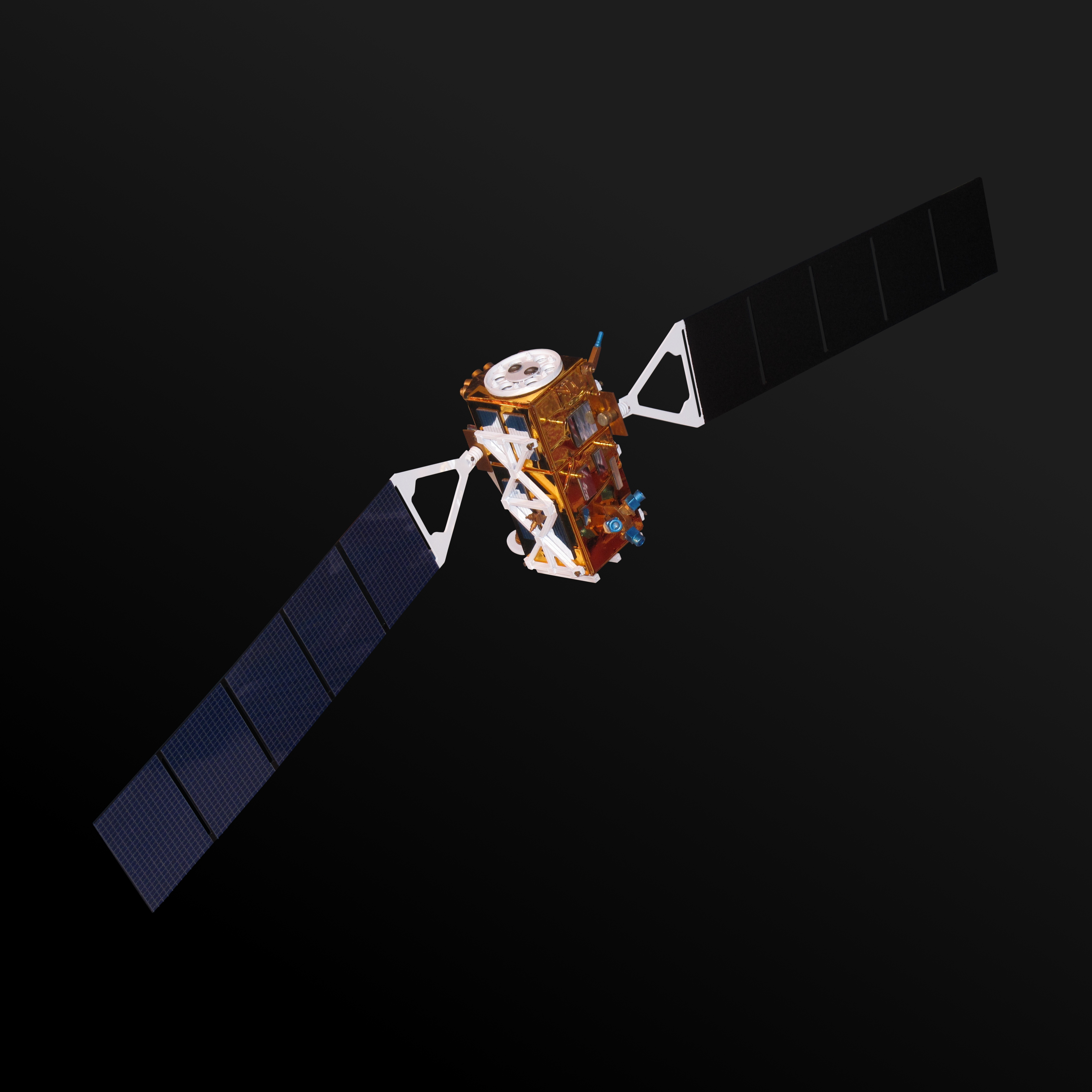
- Model of a Sentinel-1 satellite (with radar antenna missing)
- Mission type: Earth observation
- Operator: ESA
- COSPAR ID: 2024-235A
- SATCAT no.: 62261

Spacecraft properties
- Spacecraft type: Sentinel-1

Start of mission
- Launch date: 05 December 2024, 21:20
- Rocket: Vega C (VV25)

Sentinel-1C is a European radar imaging Earth observation satellite launched on 5 December, 2024 by Vega C. It is the third satellite in the Sentinel-1 constellation, part of the European Union's Copernicus programme. The satellite is equipped with a C-band Synthetic Aperture Radar (SAR) instrument, capable of providing high-resolution imagery regardless of weather conditions.

== Timeline ==
Development contract signed with Thales Alenia Space of Italy in December 2015. Launch was scheduled for April 2023 but was delayed due to a launch failure of Vega-C in December 2022. It was launched on 5 December 2024. ESA paid €51.65 million for the launch services.

== See also ==
- List of European Space Agency programmes and missions
