= Telespazio =

European space services company

Telespazio Spa
- Type: Joint venture
- Industry: Aerospace
- Founded: 1961; 65 years ago
- Headquarters: Rome, Italy
- Services: Satellite services
- Owner: Leonardo (67%); Thales Group (33%)
- Number of employees: Approx. 3,000
- Subsidiaries: Telespazio UK; Telespazio Germany
- Website: www.telespazio.com

Telespazio Spa is an aerospace joint venture between Italian conglomerate Leonardo (67%) and the French corporation Thales Group (33%). It forms one half of their Space Alliance alongside Thales Alenia Space. Telespazio is headquartered in Rome, Italy.

Telespazio provides satellite-based services, ground operations, and space solutions such as end-to-end operational software and mission support required to manage space flight and utilize satellite data. The company notably manages satellite control centers and ground infrastructure like the Fucino Space Centre; and is involved in various programmes, including Galileo, EGNOS, Copernicus, COSMO-SkyMed, SICRAL and Göktürk.

Telespazio operates in France as Telespazio France; and has subsidiaries in Germany (Telespazio Germany, GAF and Spaceopal), in the United Kingdom (Telespazio UK), Spain (Telespazio Ibérica) and Romania (Rartel). Telespazio also operates in South America through Telespazio Brasil and Telespazio Argentina. In Italy, the company is also present through e-GEOS.

Plans have been announced to merge Telespazio, Thales Alenia Space, and the Space Systems and Space Digital divisions of Airbus Defence and Space into a new joint venture owned by Airbus (35%), Leonardo (32.5%), and Thales (32.5%). The combined entity would have had an estimated annual turnover of €6.5 billion. If approved by regulators, the new company is expected to be operational in 2027.

== History ==
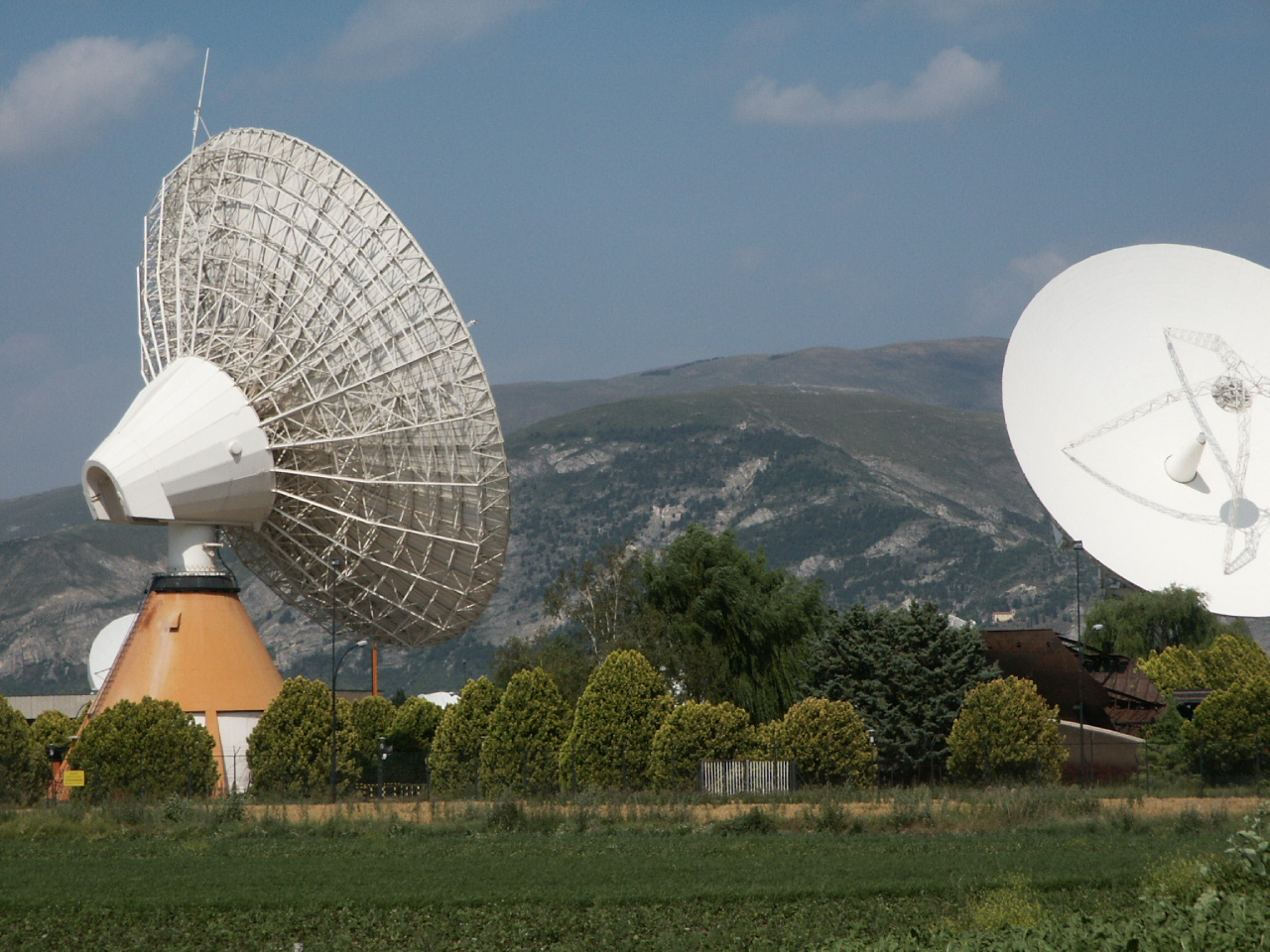
Telescopic parabolic antennas in Fucino

On 18 October 1961, Telespazio was established under the auspices of several Italian organisations, including the National Research Council (CNR) and the Post and Telecommunications Ministry, Italcable and Rai. During the following year, NASA signed a memorandum of understanding with Telespazio to test the Telstar and Relay satellites. In 1963, the first signals from the Telstar satellite were received by the new Fucino testing station (Ortucchio, Abruzzo), the first pictures came through a few months later.

During 1964, Telespazio helped create history for its role in facilitating the first television broadcasts, directly from Fucino via the Telstar satellite. During the following year, it signed its first agreement with communications satellite service provider Intelsat; in June 1965, commercial telecommunications traffic was inaugurated between North America and Europe. In 1968, Intelsat and Telespazio signed an agreement to provide the first telemetry and remote control services on Intelsat satellites. During 1969, the firm played a role in distributing the live broadcast of the Apollo 11 Moon landing across Europe.

During the 1970s, Telespazio experienced a period of expansion and diversification. During May 1974, it signed a memorandum of understanding with NASA to engage itself in the Landsat program, gathering satellite imagery for Earth Observation purposes according to the signed in May 1974. During that same year, Telespazio became involved in the development of the Sirio programme, thus helping to launch the first Italian telecommunications satellite during 1977. Other major activities of the decade included the in-orbit control of satellites, and the opening of a second space centre in Gera Lario, Lombardia in 1977.

In the 1980s, the company continued to be involved in the development of several Italian space-related programmes, such as Italsat. During 1983, under the auspices of CNR and subsequently, the Italian Space Agency (ASI), Telespazio established and managed the Matera Space Center for Geodesy Operations. In 1987, it inaugurated its third space center handling satellites communications, based in Scanzano, Palermo.

On 30 May 1991, Telespazio launched the ARGO project, the first closed network equipped with small fixed antennas for emergency communications, intended for Italian civil protection. During 1994, Telespazio Argentina, based in Buenos Aires, is established. On 30 April 1996, the BeppoSAX scientific satellite, operated by the firm, was launched. In the following year, it founded its second subsidiary, Telespazio Brasil, based in Rio de Janeiro. During 1998, Telespazio partnered with Romanian firm Radiocom to establish the Rartel Company, thus developing a presence in this country as well. That same year, the firm finalised an agreement with European satellite operator Eutelsat to take control and commercialise of the EMS payload carried on the Italsat F2 communications satellite.

On 7 February 2001, Italy's first military communications satellite system, the Telespazio-managed SICRAL 1, was launched. During December 2002, the firm became a part of the Italian aerospace conglomerate Finmeccanica; the acquisition had involved a lengthy period of negotiation with Telespazio's former parent company, Telecom Italia. On 25 July 2003, Telespazio acquired the German Earth observation satellite services specialist GAF AG.

The company became a Franco-Italian joint venture on 1 July 2005, through a merger between Telespazio and the space services division of Alcatel. Creation of the joint venture was concurrent with the creation of Alcatel Alenia Space (now Thales Alenia Space), formed by the merger of two other Alcatel and Finmeccanica (since 2016 rebranded Leonardo-Finmeccanica) space businesses (Alcatel Space and Alenia Spazio respectively).

During 2007, the European Commission (EC) approved the transfer to Thales of Alcatel's interests in joint ventures Alcatel Alenia Space (Thales: 67%; Finmeccanica: 33%) and Telespazio (Finmeccanica: 67%; Thales: 33%); this restructuring resulted in the creation of a new space-orientated alliance between Thales and Finmeccanica. Prior to approving the change, the EC had performed an in-depth investigation due to concerns that the transfer may have had a detrimental effect on downstream satellite and subsystem competition.

In January 2011, Telespazio acquired the space activities of two Finmeccanica subsidiares, the Italy-based Elsag Datamat Space and the UK-based VEGA (the latter was subsequently renamed Telespazio VEGA UK) for an undisclosed price. On 20 September 2011, a strike at the company reportedly caused a delay in the launch of an Ariane 5 heavy-lift launch vehicle.

During 2017, Thales Alenia Space and Telespazio formed a partnership with Seattle-based Spaceflight Industries to accelerate plans for a constellation of 60 Earth observation satellites. In the following year, Orange S.A. teamed up with the firm to provide satellite-based telecommunications to the French military.

In September 2019, Airbus partnered with Telespazio to market military telecommunications services using the future Syracuse IV satellites.

== See also ==
- Leonardo
- List of Italian companies
