= Earth observation =

Information about the Earth environment

Earth observation (EO) is the gathering of information about the physical, chemical, and biological systems of the planet Earth. It can be performed via remote-sensing technologies (Earth observation satellites) or through direct-contact sensors in ground-based or airborne platforms (such as weather stations and weather balloons, for example).

According to the Group on Earth Observations (GEO), the concept encompasses both "space-based or remotely-sensed data, as well as ground-based or in situ data". Earth observation is used to monitor and assess the status of and changes in natural and built environments.

== Terminology ==
In Europe, Earth observation has often been used to refer to satellite-based remote sensing, but the term is also used to refer to any form of observations of the Earth system, including in situ and airborne observations, for example. The GEO, which has over 100 member countries and over 100 participating organizations, uses EO in this broader sense.

In the US, the term remote sensing has been used since the 1960s to refer to satellite-based remote sensing. Remote sensing has also been used more broadly for observations utilizing any form of remote sensing technology, including airborne sensors and even ground-based sensors such as cameras. Perhaps the least ambiguous term to use for satellite-based sensors is satellite remote sensing (SRS), an acronym which is gradually starting to appear in the literature.

== Types ==
Earth observations may include:

- numerical measurements taken by a thermometer, wind gauge, ocean buoy, altimeter or seismometer
- photos and radar or sonar images taken from ground or ocean-based instruments
- photos and radar images taken from remote-sensing satellites
- decision-support tools based on processed information, such as maps and models

== Applications ==
Just as Earth observations consist of a wide variety of possible elements, they can be applied to a wide variety of uses. Some of the specific applications of Earth observations are:

- forecasting weather
- tracking biodiversity and wildlife trends
- measuring land-use change (such as deforestation)
- monitoring and responding to natural disasters, including fires, floods, earthquakes, landslides, land subsidence and tsunamis
- managing natural resources, such as energy, freshwater and agriculture
- addressing emerging diseases and other health risks
- predicting, adapting to and mitigating climate change

== Trends ==
The ongoing launch of new remote-sensing satellites, in situ instruments located on the ground, as well as those on balloons and airplanes, and in rivers, lakes and oceans, have increased the availability and frequency of comprehensive and nearly real-time observations.

Starting from 2017, Earth observation have become increasingly technologically sophisticated. It has also become more important due to the dramatic impact that modern human civilization is having on the world and the need to minimize negative effects (e.g. geohazards), along with the opportunities such observation provides to improve social and economic well-being.

== See also ==
- Digital terrain model
- Environmental data
- Earth observation satellite
- First images of Earth from space
- FlyPix
- Geographic data
- Group on Earth Observations
- Global Earth Observation System of Systems
- Phi Lab
- Landsat program
- TerraSAR-X: a German Earth observation satellite
- Radiant Earth Foundation: a non-profit organization applying machine learning for Earth observation
- Artificial structures visible from space – Human-made things that can be seen from space
- Earth phase – Phases of Earth as seen from the Moon
- List of Earth observation satellites
- Pale Orange Dot, a NASA digital model showing a possible early Earth
- Overview effect – Cognitive shift after seeing Earth from space
- Space selfie – Self-portrait photo taken in outer space
- Earth in culture – Cultural perspectives about Earth
- Extraterrestrial sky#Earth and Moon from Mars
