= Research institute =

Establishment endowed for doing research

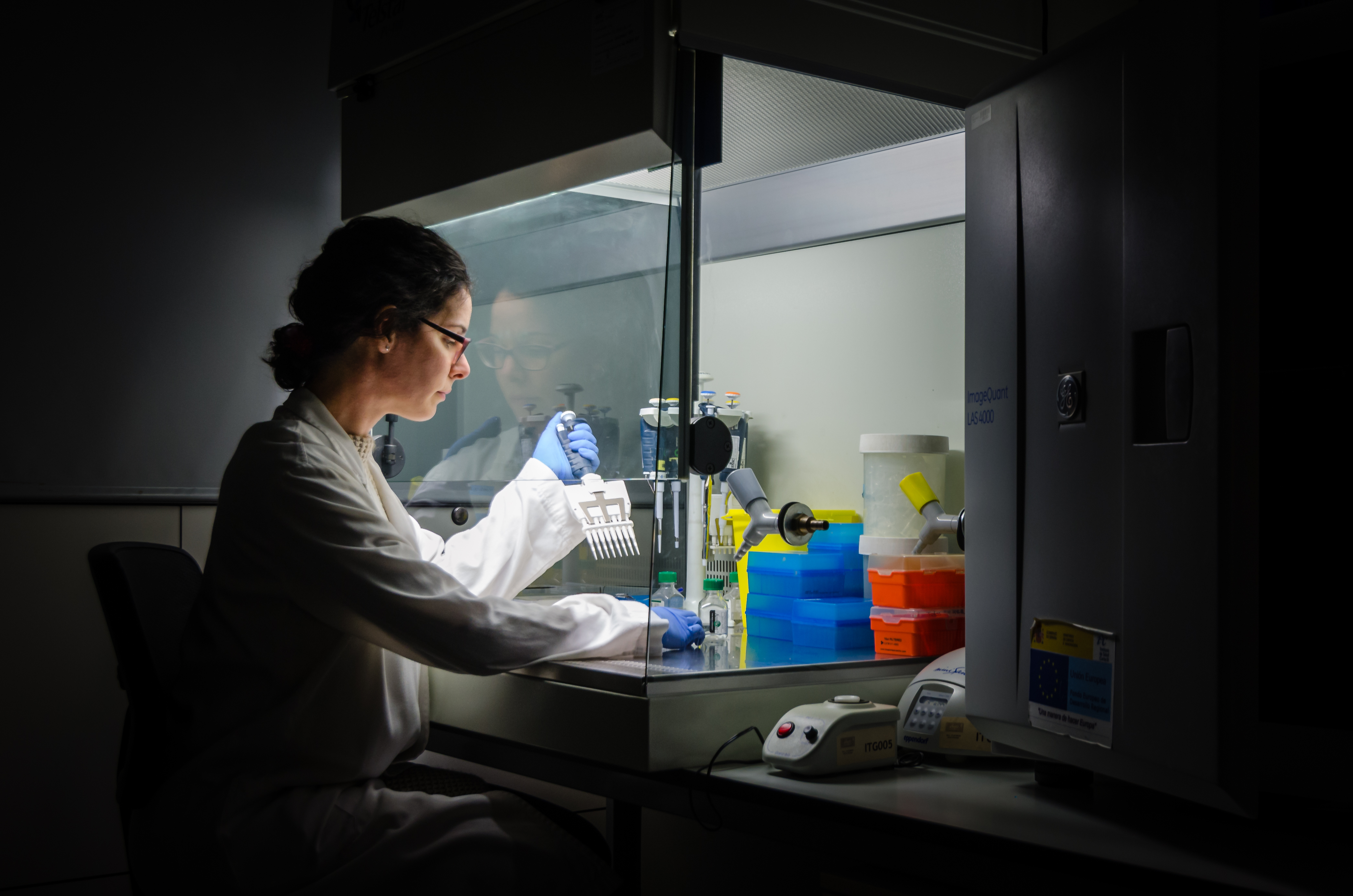
Researcher working in a laboratory

A research institute, research centre, or research organization is an establishment founded for doing research. Research institutes may specialize in basic research or may be oriented to applied research. Although the term often implies natural science research, there are also many research institutes in the social science as well, especially for sociological and historical research purposes.

== Famous research institutes ==
In the early medieval period, several astronomical observatories were built in the Islamic world. The first of these was the 9th-century Baghdad observatory built during the time of the Abbasid caliph al-Ma'mun, though the most famous were the 13th-century Maragheh observatory, and the 15th-century Ulugh Beg Observatory.

The Kerala School of Astronomy and Mathematics was a school of mathematics and astronomy founded by Madhava of Sangamagrama in Kerala, India. The school flourished between the 14th and 16th centuries, and the original discoveries of the school seem to have ended with Narayana Bhattathiri (1559–1632). In attempting to solve astronomical problems, the Kerala school independently discovered a number of important mathematical concepts.

The earliest research institute in Europe was Tycho Brahe's Uraniborg complex on the island of Hven, a 16th-century astronomical laboratory set up to make highly accurate measurements of the stars. The oldest research institute in Asia, the Indian Association for the Cultivation of Science, was founded in 1876.

Thomas Edison, dubbed "The Wizard of Menlo Park", was one of the first inventors to apply the principles of mass production and large-scale teamwork to the process of invention in the late 1800s, and, because of that, he is often credited with the creation of the first industrial research laboratory.

In the United States there are numerous notable research institutes including Bell Labs, Xerox Parc, The Scripps Research Institute, Beckman Institute, RTI International, and SRI International. Hughes Aircraft used a research institute structure for its organizational model.

== Research institutes in Europe ==
From the Scientific Revolution came the 17th-century scientific academy. In London, the Royal Society was founded in 1660, and in France, Louis XIV founded the Académie royale des sciences in 1666, which came after private academic assemblies had been created earlier in the seventeenth century to foster research.

In the early 18th century, Peter the Great established an educational-research institute to be built in his newly created imperial capital, St Petersburg. His plan combined provisions for linguistic, philosophical, and scientific instruction with a separate academy in which graduates could pursue further scientific research. It was the first institution of its kind in Europe to conduct scientific research within the structure of a university. The St Petersburg Academy was established by decree on 28 January 1724.

At the European level, there are now several government-funded institutions such as the European Space Agency (ESA), the nuclear research centre CERN, the European Southern Observatory (ESO) (Grenoble), the European Synchrotron Radiation Facility (ESRF) (Grenoble), EUMETSAT, the Italian-European Sistema Trieste with, among others, the International Centre for Theoretical Physics and the research complex Elettra Sincrotrone Trieste, the biology project EMBL, and the fusion project ITER, which in addition to technical developments has a strong research focus.

== Scientific research in the 20th century United States ==
Research institutes came to emerge at the beginning of the twentieth century. In 1900, at least in Europe and the United States, the scientific profession had evolved only so far as to include the theoretical implications of science and not its application. Research scientists had yet to establish leadership in expertise. Outside scientific circles, it was generally assumed that a person in an occupation related to the sciences carried out work that was necessarily "scientific" and that the skill of the scientist did not hold any more merit than the skill of a labourer. A philosophical position on science was not considered by all researchers to be intellectually superior to applied methods. However, any research on scientific application was limited by comparison. A loose definition attributed all naturally occurring phenomena to "science". The growth of scientific study stimulated a desire to reinvigorate the scientific discipline by robust research in order to extract "pure" science from such broad categorisation.

=== 1900–1939 ===
This began with research conducted autonomously away from public utility and governmental supervision. Enclaves for industrial investigations became established. These included the Rockefeller Institute, Carnegie Institution of Washington, and the Institute for Advanced Study. Research was advanced in both theory and application. This was aided by substantial private donation.

=== 1940 onward ===
As of 2006, there were over 14,000 research centres in the United States.

The growth of university research departments created massive scientific communities through mass education. After WWII and the atomic bomb, public awareness shifted scientific focus toward two main areas: national defense and environmental pollution.

== Notable research centres ==
=== Australia ===
- Commonwealth Scientific and Industrial Research Organisation

=== Belgium ===
- Interuniversity Microelectronics Centre

=== Canada ===
- National Research Council Canada

=== China ===
- Chinese Academy of Sciences

=== France ===
- French Alternative Energies and Atomic Energy Commission
- French National Centre for Scientific Research
- Institut National de la Santé et de la Recherche Médicale

=== Germany ===
- Fraunhofer Society
- Helmholtz Association
- Max Planck Society

=== Hong Kong ===
- Hong Kong Applied Science and Technology Research Institute
- Nano and Advanced Materials Institute Limited

=== Hungary ===
- Biological Research Centre

=== India ===
- Bose Institute
- Council of Scientific and Industrial Research
- Indian Association for the Cultivation of Science
- Indian Council of Medical Research
- Tata Institute of Fundamental Research

=== Italy ===
- Abdus Salam International Centre for Theoretical Physics

=== Japan ===
- National Institute for Materials Science
- Riken

=== Luxembourg ===
- Luxembourg Institute of Science and Technology

=== Netherlands ===
- Centrum Wiskunde & Informatica
- Netherlands Organisation for Applied Scientific Research

=== Russia ===
- Russian Academy of Sciences

=== South Korea ===
- Electronics and Telecommunications Research Institute
- Korea Atomic Energy Research Institute
- Korea Electronics Technology Institute
- Korea Institute of Science and Technology
- Korea Research Institute of Chemical Technology

=== Sri Lanka ===
- Sri Lanka Institute of Nanotechnology

=== Taiwan ===
- Academica Sinica
- Industrial Technology Research Institute
- Institute for Information Industry

=== United Kingdom ===
- European Bioinformatics Institute
- Francis Crick Institute

=== United States ===
- American Institutes for Research
- Ames Research Center
- Argonne National Laboratory
- Bell Labs
- Broad Institute of MIT and Harvard
- Carnegie Institution for Science
- Center for Advanced Life Cycle Engineering
- Center for Advanced Study in the Behavioral Sciences
- Fred Hutchinson Cancer Center
- H. Lee Moffitt Cancer Center & Research Institute
- Institute for Advanced Study
- Marine Sciences Research Center
- Mayo Clinic
- Memorial Sloan Kettering Cancer Center
- New York Genome Center
- Palo Alto Research Center
- Pennington Biomedical Research Center
- Rockefeller Institute
- RTI International, also known as Research Triangle Institute
- Salk Institute for Biological Studies
- Scripps Research
- Southwest Research Institute
- SRI International, known as Stanford Research Institute until 1977
- Thomas J. Watson Research Center

== See also ==
- Think tank
- European Survey Research Association
- London Research Institute
- Research funding
- Contract research organization
- Research Organization Registry
