= Sentinel-6 Michael Freilich =

Earth observation satellite

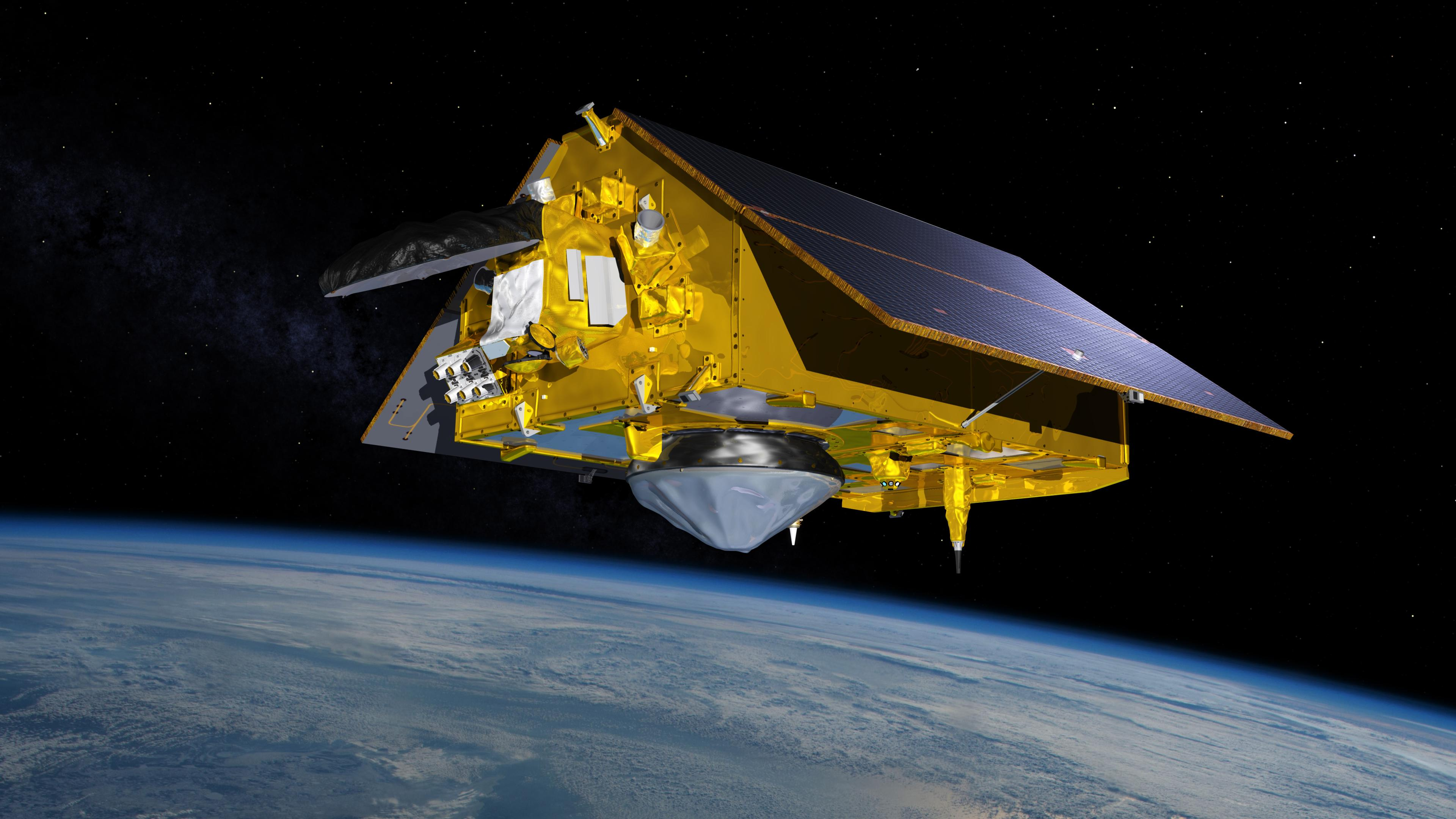
- Illustration of the Sentinel-6 Michael Freilich spacecraft in orbit above Earth with its deployable solar panels extended
- Names: Sentinel-6A; Jason-CS A
- Mission type: Oceanography mission
- Operator: EUMETSAT / NASA
- COSPAR ID: 2020-086A
- SATCAT no.: 46984
- Website: www.eumetsat.int/sentinel-6
- Mission duration: 5.5 years (planned); 5 years, 5 months and 22 days (in progress)

Spacecraft properties
- Bus: Sentinel-6
- Manufacturer: Airbus Defence and Space
- Launch mass: 1,192 kg (2,628 lb)
- Dimensions: 5.13 x 4.17 x 2.34 metres
- Power: 891 watts

Start of mission
- Launch date: 21 November 2020, 17:17:08 UTC
- Rocket: Falcon 9 Block 5
- Launch site: Vandenberg, SLC-4E
- Contractor: SpaceX
- Entered service: 21 June 2021

Orbital parameters
- Reference system: Geocentric orbit
- Regime: Low Earth orbit
- Altitude: 1,336 km (830 mi)
- Inclination: 66.0°
- Repeat interval: 10 days

Instruments
- Radar altimeter; Advanced Microwave Radiometer (AMR-C); GNSS Precise Orbit Determination (POD) Receiver; DORIS Receiver; Laser Reflector Array (LRA); Radio-occultation instrument
- Sentinel Jason satellite series/Sentinel 6

The Sentinel-6 Michael Freilich (S6MF) or Sentinel-6A is a radar altimeter satellite developed in partnership between several European and American organizations. It is part of the Jason satellite series and is named after Michael Freilich. S6MF includes synthetic-aperture radar altimetry techniques to improve ocean topography measurements, in addition to rivers and lakes. The spacecraft entered service in mid 2021 and is expected to operate for 5.5 years.

== Spacecraft ==
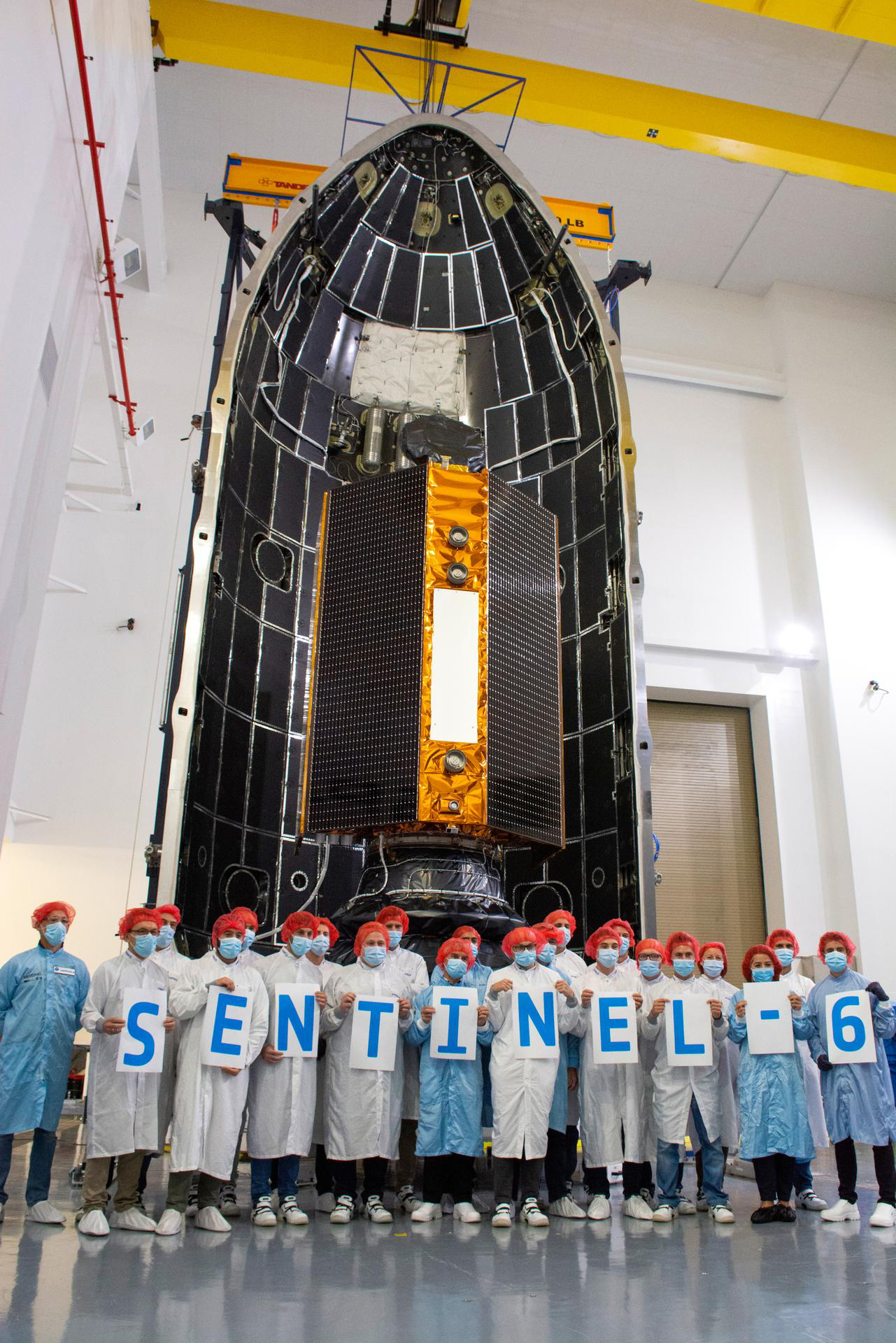
Inside SpaceX's Payload Processing Facility at Vandenberg Air Force Base in California, the U.S.-European Sentinel-6 Michael Freilich ocean-monitoring satellite is being encapsulated in the SpaceX Falcon 9 payload fairing on 3 November 2020. (NASA)

The Sentinel-6 program includes two identical satellites, to be launched five years apart, Sentinel-6 Michael Freilich, which launched on 21 November 2020, and Sentinel-6B, which will launch in 2025. These satellites will measure sea level change from space, which have been measured without interruption since 1992.

Formerly called Sentinel-6A and Jason-CS A (Jason Continuity of Service-A), it was renamed in honor of the former director of NASA Earth Science Division, Michael Freilich, who was instrumental in advancing space-based ocean measurements. It follows the most recent U.S.-European sea level observation satellite, Jason-3, which launched in 2016, and is currently providing high-precision and timely observations of the topography of the global ocean.

== Context ==
Since the launch of TOPEX/Poseidon on 10 August 1992, high-precision satellite altimeters have been essential to monitor how the ocean stores and redistributes heat, water, and carbon in the climate system. The two satellites, Sentinel-6 Michael Freilich and Sentinel-6B, will extend this legacy through to at least 2030, which will provide a nearly forty-year record of sea level rise as well as changes in ocean currents.

== Partnership ==
The Sentinel-6 was developed by European Space Agency (ESA) in the context of the European Copernicus Programme led by the European Commission, the European Organisation for the Exploitation of Meteorological Satellites (EUMETSAT), NASA, and the National Oceanic and Atmospheric Administration (NOAA), with funding support from the European Commission and technical support from France's National Centre for Space Studies (CNES, Centre national d'études spatiales).

The Sentinel-6 mission is part of the Copernicus programme initiative, the main objective of the Sentinel-6 mission is to measure sea surface topography with high accuracy and reliability to support ocean forecasting systems, environmental monitoring and climate monitoring.

The mission definition is driven by the need for continuity in provision of TOPEX/Poseidon mission and Jason satellite series (Jason-1, OSTM/Jason-2, and Jason-3) with improvements in instrument performance and coverage. ESA, NASA, and EUMETSAT will provide mission management and system engineering support. EUMETSAT and NASA will be responsible for long-term archives of altimetry data products. All partners will be involved with the selection of science investigators.

=== Responsibilities of partners ===
Launch

ESA

- has responsibility for the development of the first satellite and the ground prototype processors, and for procurement of the second satellite on behalf of EUMETSAT and the European Commission
- has responsibility for conducting the Launch and Early Operations Phase (LEOP) of both satellites
- supports flight operations performed by EUMETSAT

EUMETSAT

- has responsibility for ground segment development and coordination at system level, including for operations preparation
- has responsibility for conducting operations of the two satellites after LEOP performed by ESA
- has responsibility for conducting operations of the European part of the ground segment, including processing of altimeter data and delivery of product services to European users

NASA

- has responsibility for the development and delivery of the U.S. payload instruments, the microwave radiometer and the GNSS radio occultation receiver
- provides launch services for both satellites
- provides ground segment development support and will contribute to operations and data processing on the U.S. side, including processing of GNSS radio occultation data
- with NOAA, shares responsibility for the distribution of products to research and operational users in the U.S.

NOAA

- provides a U.S. ground station for tracking and command of the satellite and data downlinks
- with NASA, shares responsibility for the distribution of products to research and operational users in the U.S.

CNES

- has responsibility for processing higher-level products (L2P, L3)
- has responsibility for providing precise orbit determination and support for Doris and altimeter operations

== Instruments ==
- POSEIDON4, a radar altimeter, developed by ESA, based on the Sentinel-3 SRAL instrument, but with a design adopted to allow an interleaved mode combining a synthetic-aperture radar High-Resolution (HR) mode and a low resolution (LR) mode based on pulse-limited altimetry
- Advanced Microwave Radiometer (AMR-C) provided by NASA
- Global Navigation Satellite System Precise Orbit Determination (GNSS POD) receiver, developed by ESA and derived from the GNSS Receiver on Sentinel-3
- Doppler Orbitography and Radiopositioning Integrated by Satellite (DORIS Receiver), identical to the one used on Jason-3 and Sentinel-3
- Laser Reflector Array (LRA), used for satellite laser ranging, identical to the one used on Jason-3, provided by NASA
- GNSS Radio Occultation (GNSS-RO) based on a Tri-G receiver, provided by NASA
