= Arctic Weather Satellite =

European weather satellite

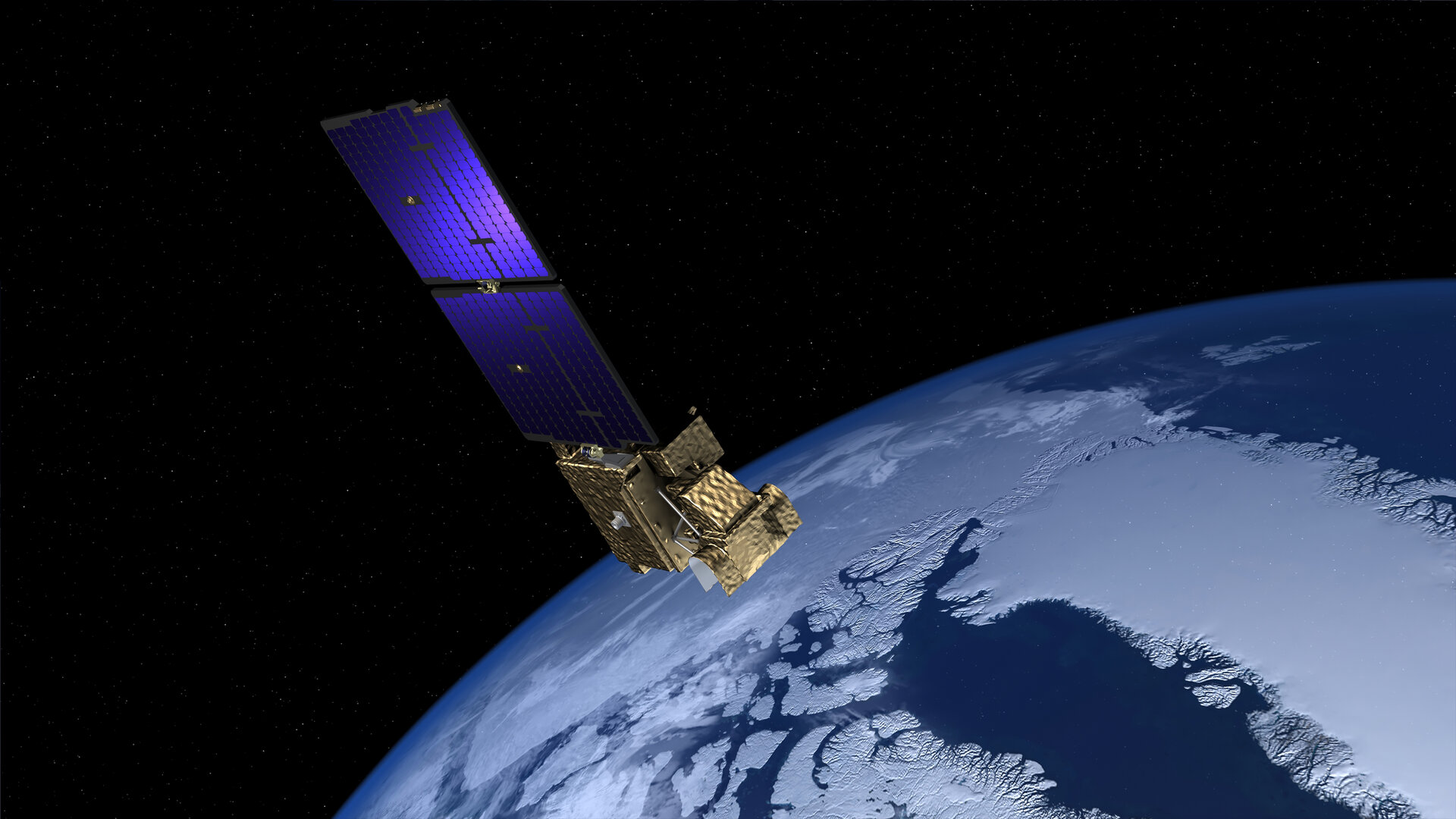
- Arctic Weather Satellite design, 2021
- Mission type: Weather satellite
- Operator: ESA, EUMETSAT
- COSPAR ID: 2024-149CZ
- SATCAT no.: 60563
- Website: Arctic Weather Satellite
- Mission duration: 5 years (expected)

Spacecraft properties
- Bus: InnoSat
- Manufacturer: OHB Sweden
- Launch mass: 120 kilograms (260 lb)
- Power: 160 Watts

Start of mission
- Launch date: 16 August 2024
- Rocket: Falcon 9
- Launch site: Vandenberg SLC-4E
- Contractor: SpaceX

Orbital parameters
- Regime: Sun-synchronous
- Altitude: 600 km

The Arctic Weather Satellite (AWS) is a technology demonstrator weather satellite built by consortium led by OHB Sweden, a satellite provider and subsidiary of OHB SE, under the direction by the European Space Agency (ESA) and EUMETSAT. It was launched in August 2024 from Vandenberg and is a precursor of the future EPS-Sterna satellite constellation.

== See also ==
- List of European Space Agency programmes and missions
