= EPS-Sterna =

European weather satellite constellation

- Manufacturer: OHB
- Operator: EUMETSAT, ESA

Specifications
- Regime: Polar orbit

Production
- Status: Approved in January 2026
- Planned: 20
- Launched: 0
- Maiden launch: 2029 (planned)

EPS-Sterna (EUMETSAT Polar System – Sterna) is a future European constellation of weather satellites under development by EUMETSAT and the European Space Agency (ESA). The satellites will be placed on polar orbits and observe atmospheric conditions using microwave sounders. The constellation's goal is to improve the frequency of observations needed for predicting severe weather in specific regions such as Mediterranean and to address data gaps over the Arctic. EPS-Sterna builds upon technologies demonstrated by ESA's Arctic Weather Satellite (AWS) launched in 2024. The constellation will be built by the Swedish-German company OHB Sweden. The name of the constellation refers to Sterna, the genus name of the Arctic tern. Launch of the first six satellites is expected in 2029.

== See also ==
- List of European Space Agency programmes and missions
