= Michael Freilich (oceanographer) =

American oceanographer (1954–2020)

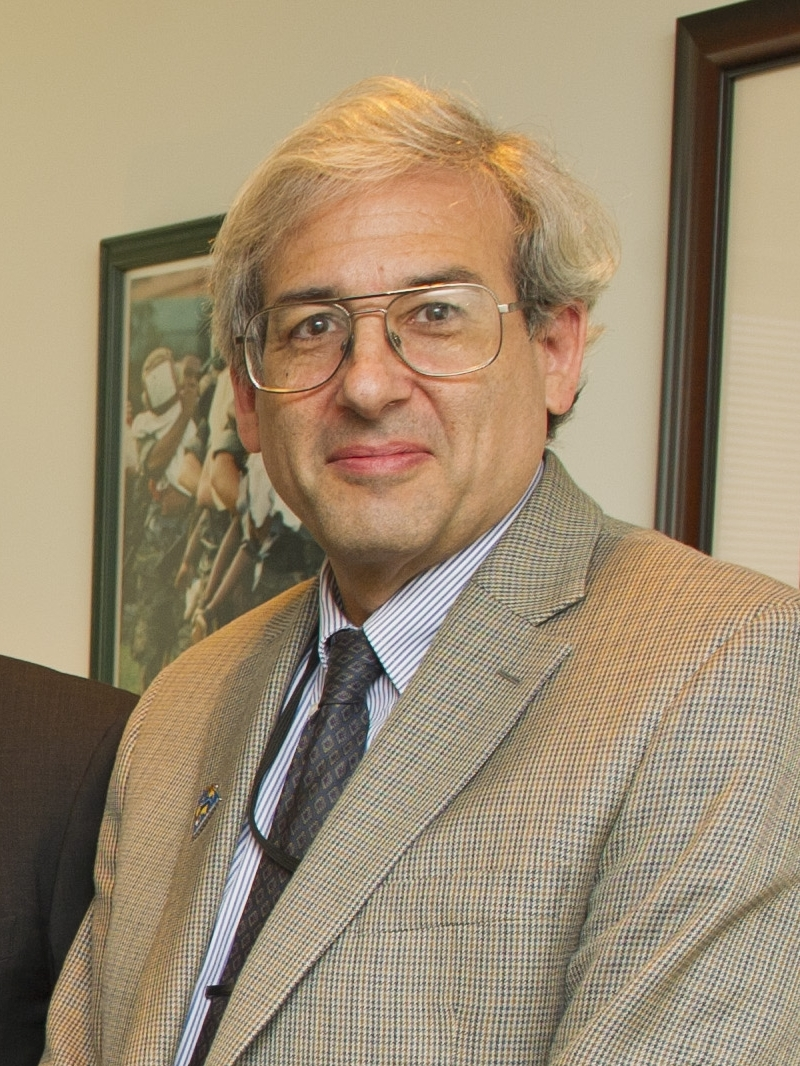
- Born: Michael H. Freilich; January 14, 1954; Kensington, Maryland, U.S.
- Died: August 5, 2020 (aged 66)
- Education: Scripps Institution of Oceanography, University of California at San Diego
- Occupation: Director of the NASA Earth Science division from 2006–2019
- Employer(s): NASA and formerly Oregon State University
- Known for: Microwave ocean remote sensing; surface wave modeling
- Notable work: Sentinel-6 Michael Freilich

Michael H. Freilich (January 14, 1954 – August 5, 2020) was an American oceanographer who served as director of the NASA Earth Science division from 2006–2019.

In January 2020, NASA announced that the Sentinel-6A Oceanography mission was being renamed the Sentinel-6 Michael Freilich in his honor. Freilich played a key role in establishing the international partnership behind this mission. Thomas Zurbuchen, head of NASA's Science Mission Directorate (SMD), paid tribute to him as follows:

"Mike Freilich exemplified the commitment to excellence, generosity of spirit and the unmatched ability to inspire trust that made so many people across the world want to work with NASA, to advance big goals on behalf of the planet and its people".

In addition to his leadership in defining the direction of Earth systems science research, Michael Freilich was committed to enhancing diversity and increasing educational opportunities for underrepresented groups in remote sensing and climate science research. To this end, Oregon State University has established the Michael Freilich Memorial Fund to support Mike's commitment in this area.

== Early life and education ==
Michael Freilich was born to Arthur and Paula Freilich in Kensington, Maryland. He earned his undergraduate degree in physics and chemistry from Haverford College in 1975 and his doctorate in oceanography from the Scripps Institution of Oceanography (University of California at San Diego) in 1982.

== Career ==
Freilich joined the Marine Sciences Research Center, State University of New York at Stony Brook as an assistant professor in 1982. He subsequently moved to the Jet Propulsion Laboratory (JPL), California Institute of Technology in 1983. At JPL, Freilich was the remote sensing lead scientist for Scatterometry and led NASA's NSCAT and SeaWinds/ADEOS II space-borne scatterometer instrument development activities, as project scientist (NSCAT) and principal investigator (SeaWinds/ADEOS II). He served as the U.S. Scatterometer coordinating investigator for the European Space Agency ERS-1 mission. In 1992 he moved to Oregon State University where he served as a professor and associate dean in the College of Oceanic and Atmospheric Sciences.

Freilich was recruited by NASA in November 2006 to become director of the NASA Earth Science Division in the Science Mission Directorate. In this position he was responsible for leadership and management of all aspects of NASA's Earth Science Division, including Flight (satellite and airborne), Research and Analysis, Applied Sciences, and Earth Science Technology Office elements.

Freilich served on the National Research Council’s Ocean Studies and Space Studies Boards, and he chaired the NRC Committee on Earth Studies (2001-2005). He was Vice-Chair of the U.S. Global Change Research Program, was Chair of the Committee on Earth Observation Satellites(CEOS) Strategic Implementation Team (2011-2013), and was the NASA CEOS Principal. Among his many awards, Freilich received the JPL Director’s Research Achievement Award (1988), the NASA Public Service Medal (1999), and the AMS Verner Suomi Award (2004). He was elected Fellow of the American Meteorological Society in 2004, and in 2008 he delivered the NRC/Smithsonian Roger Revelle Commemorative Lecture. In 2018 he received the NASA Distinguished Achievement Award, in 2018 the NASA Distinguished Service Medal, and also the Distinguished Presidential Rank Award.

Michael Freilich died at home of pancreatic cancer on the 5th of August 2020. In addition to his brother, he is survived by wife Shoshannah; daughter Sarah; son Daniel; mother Paula; a sister; a granddaughter; and other relatives.
