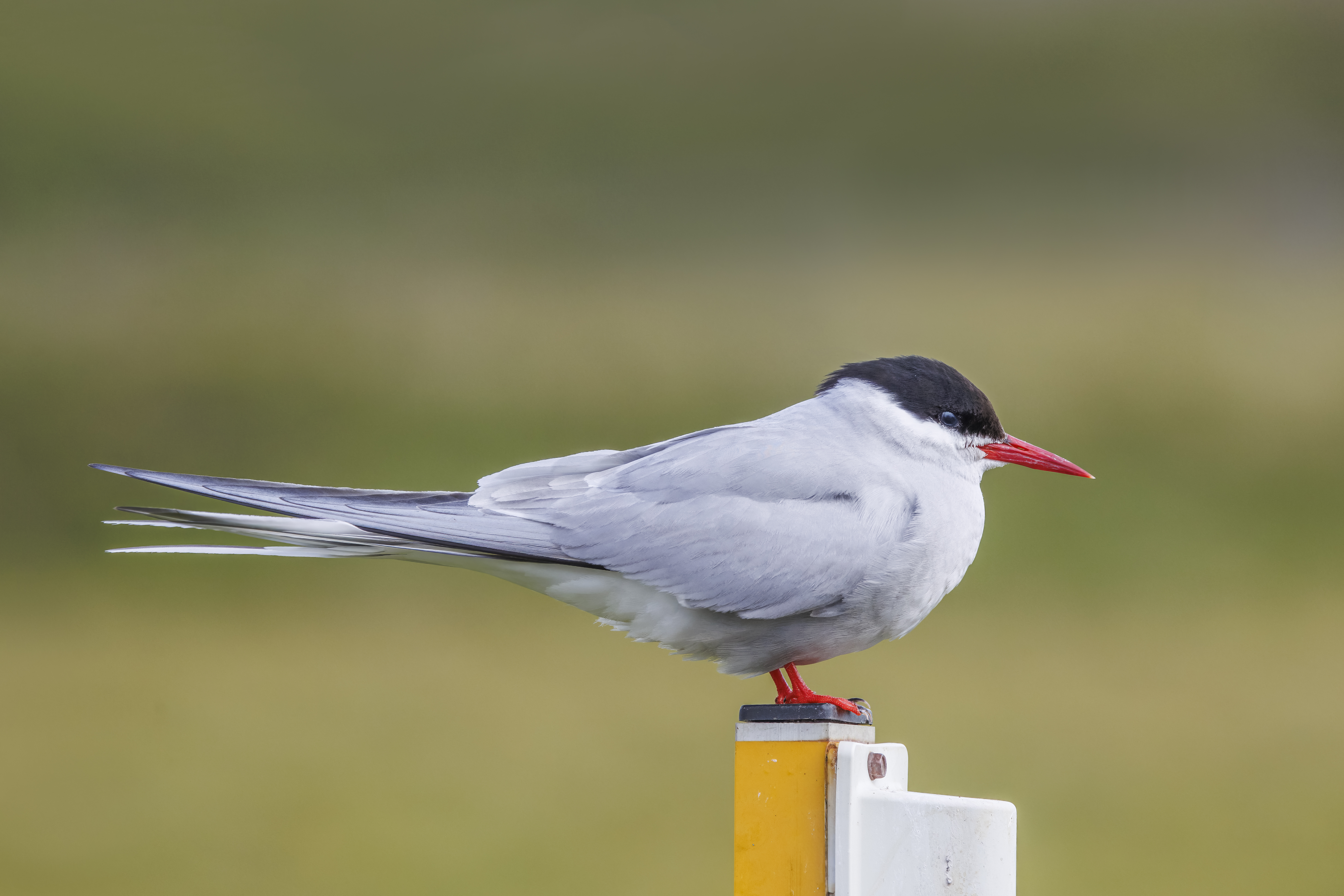
- Flatey Island, Western Iceland

Conservation status
- Least Concern (IUCN 3.1)

Scientific classification
- Kingdom: Animalia
- Phylum: Chordata
- Class: Aves
- Order: Charadriiformes
- Family: Laridae
- Genus: Sterna
- Species: S. paradisaea

Binomial name
- Sterna paradisaea Pontoppidan, 1763
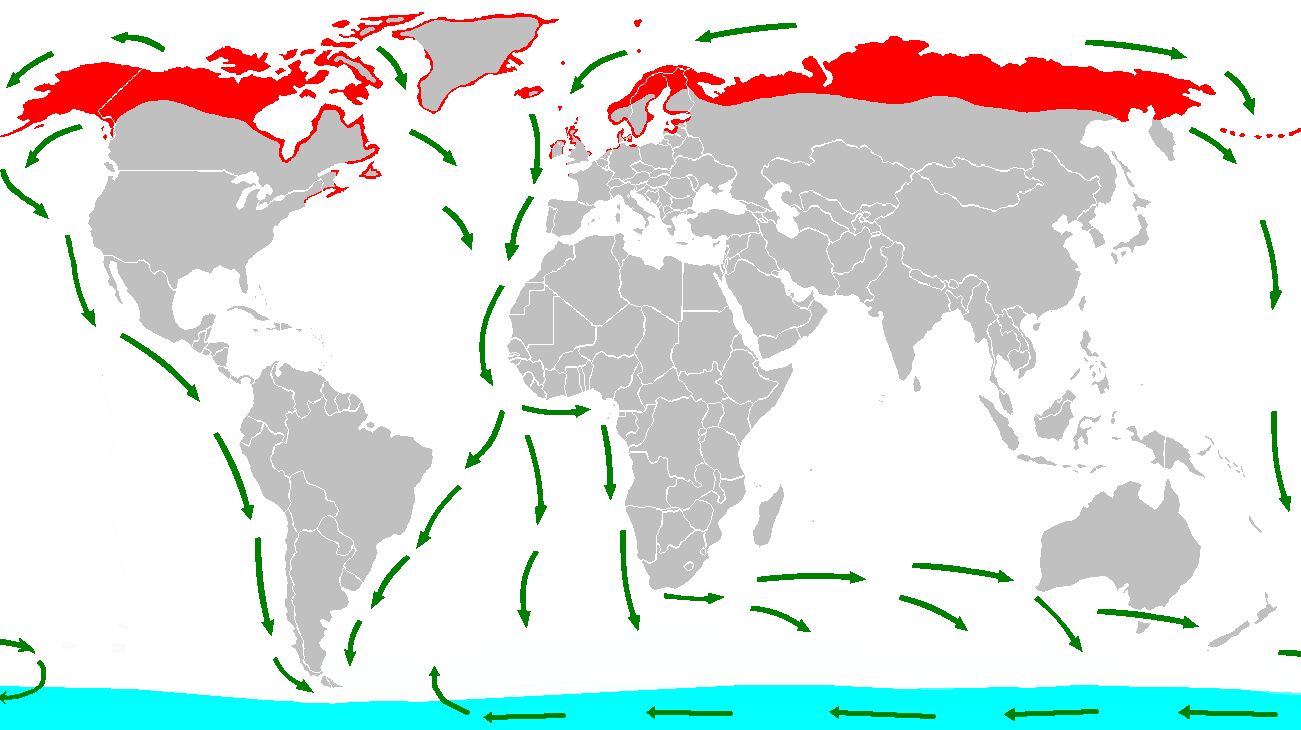
- Range of S. paradisaea Breeding grounds Wintering grounds Migration routes

Synonyms
- Sterna portlandica Sterna pikei

= Arctic tern =

Bird that breeds in the Arctic and subarctic and migrates to the Antarctic

The Arctic tern (Sterna paradisaea) is a tern in the family Laridae. This bird has a circumpolar breeding distribution covering the Arctic and subarctic regions of Europe (as far south as Brittany), Asia, and North America (as far south as Massachusetts). The species is strongly migratory, seeing two summers each year as it migrates along a convoluted route from its northern breeding grounds to the Antarctic coast for the southern summer and back again about six months later. Recent studies have shown average annual round-trip lengths of about 70,900 km (38,300 nmi) for birds nesting in Iceland and Greenland, and about 48,700 km (26,300 nmi) for birds nesting in the Netherlands, while an individual from the Farne Islands in Northumberland with a light level geolocator tag covered a staggering 96,000 km (52,000 nmi) in ten months from the end of one breeding season to the start of the next. These are by far the longest migrations known in the animal kingdom.

Arctic terns are medium-sized birds. They have a length of 33–36 cm (13–14 in) and a wingspan of 76–85 cm (30–33 in), and weigh around 100 g. In the breeding season they are mainly grey and white, with a blood-red beak and feet, a black crown and nape, and white cheeks. The mantle is grey, and the scapulars grey, tipped white. The upper wing is grey with a white leading edge and a narrow blackish trailing edge on the primary feathers; the collar is completely white, as is the rump. The deeply forked tail is whitish, with grey outer webs. In winter, the forehead becomes partly white, and the bill and legs are black. Juveniles also have a partly white forehead, and narrow pale orangey-brown fringes on the grey mantle feathers (unlike common tern, where the mantle feathers are more completely gingery-brown).

Arctic terns are long-lived birds, with many reaching fifteen to thirty years of age, with a record of 31 years. They eat mainly fish and small marine invertebrates. The species is abundant, with an estimated two million individuals. While the trend in the number of individuals in the species as a whole is not known, exploitation in the past has reduced this bird's numbers in the southern reaches of its ranges.

== Etymology ==
The genus name Sterna is derived from Old English "stearn", "tern". The specific paradisaea is from Late Latin paradisus, "paradise". The Scots names pictarnie, tarrock and their many variants are also believed to be onomatopoeic, derived from the distinctive call. Due to the difficulty in distinguishing the two species, all the informal common names are shared with the common tern.

== Distribution and migration ==
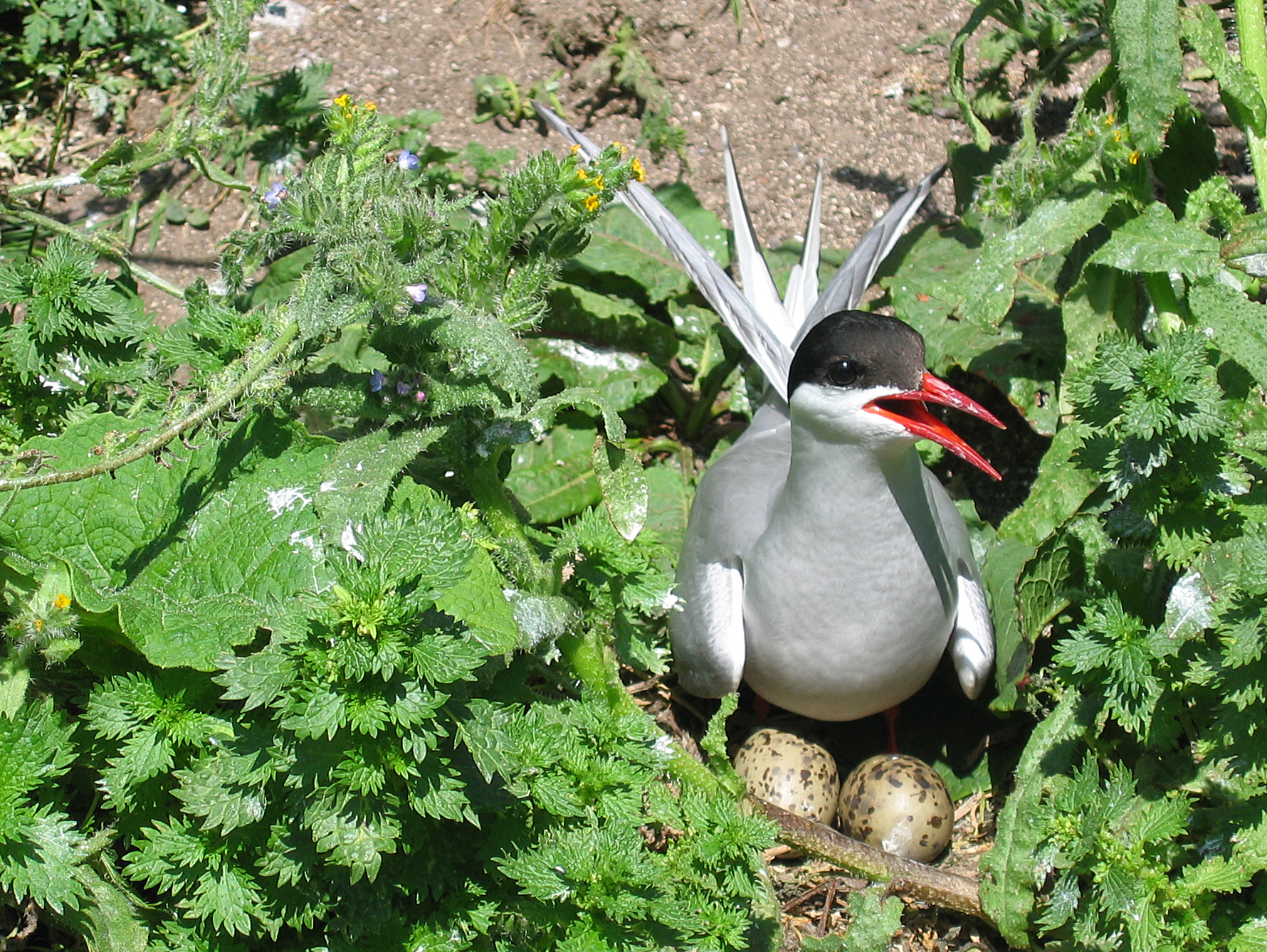
An Arctic tern nesting on the Farne Islands, from where the longest migration is recorded

The Arctic tern has a continuous worldwide circumpolar breeding distribution; there are no accepted subspecies. It can be found in coastal regions in cooler temperate parts of North America and Eurasia during the northern summer. During the southern summer, it can be found at sea, reaching the northern edge of the Antarctic ice.

The Arctic tern is famous for its migration; it flies from its Arctic breeding grounds to the Antarctic and back again each year. The shortest distance between these areas is 19,000 km (12,000 mi). The long journey ensures that this bird sees two summers per year and more daylight than any other creature on the planet. One example of this bird's remarkable long-distance flying abilities involves an Arctic tern ringed as an unfledged chick on the Farne Islands in Northumberland, UK, in the northern summer of 1982 that reached Melbourne, Australia, in October, just three months after fledging, a journey of more than 22,000 km (14,000 mi). Another example is that of a chick ringed in Labrador, Canada, on 23 July 1928. It was found in South Africa four months later.

A 2010 study using tracking devices attached to the birds showed that the above examples are not unusual for the species. In fact, the study showed that previous research had seriously underestimated the annual distances travelled by the Arctic tern. Eleven birds that bred in Greenland or Iceland covered 70,900 km (38,300 nmi) on average in a year, with a maximum of 81,600 km (44,100 nmi). The difference from previous estimates is due to the birds taking meandering courses rather than following a straight route as was previously assumed. The birds follow a somewhat convoluted course in order to take advantage of prevailing winds. The average Arctic tern lives about 30 years and will, based on the above research, travel some 2.4 million km (1.5 million mi) during its lifetime, the equivalent of a roundtrip from Earth to the Moon more than three times.

A 2013 tracking study of half a dozen Arctic terns breeding in the Netherlands shows average annual migrations of c. 48,700 km (26,300 nmi). On their way south, these birds roughly followed the coastlines of Europe and Africa.

In a 2015–2017 study of Arctic terns on the Farne Islands in Northumberland, an individual with a light level geolocator tag 'G82' covered a staggering 96,000 km (52,000 nmi) in just 10 months from the end of one breeding season to the start of the next, setting a new global migration record by travelling not just the length of the Atlantic Ocean and the width of the Indian Ocean, but also half way across the South Pacific to the boundary between the Ross and Amundsen Seas, before returning west along the Antarctic coast and back north through the Atlantic. This is more than twice the Earth's circumference.

Arctic terns usually migrate sufficiently far offshore that they are rarely seen from land outside the breeding season.

== Description and taxonomy ==
The Arctic tern is a medium-sized bird around 33–36 cm (13–14 in) from the tip of its beak to the tip of its tail. The wingspan is 76–85 cm (30–33 in). The weight is 86–127 g (3.0–4.5 oz). The beak is dark red, as are the short legs and webbed feet. Like most terns, the Arctic tern has high aspect ratio wings and a tail with a deep fork.

The adult plumage is grey above, with a black nape and crown and white cheeks. The upperwings are pale grey, with the area near the wingtip being translucent. The tail is white, and the underparts pale grey. Both sexes are similar in appearance. The winter plumage is similar, but the crown is whiter and the bills are darker.

Juveniles differ from adults in their black bill and legs, "scaly" appearing wings, and mantle with dark feather tips, dark carpal wing bar, and short tail streamers. During their first summer, juveniles also have a whiter forecrown.

The species has a variety of calls; the two most common being the alarm call, made when possible predators (such as humans or other mammals) enter the colonies, and the advertising call.

While the Arctic tern is similar to the common and roseate terns, its colouring, profile, and call are slightly different. Compared to the common tern, it has a longer tail and uniformly coloured bill, while the main differences from the roseate are its slightly darker colour and longer wings. The Arctic tern's call is more nasal and rasping than that of the common, and is easily distinguishable from that of the roseate.

This bird's closest relatives are a group of South Polar species, the South American (Sterna hirundinacea), Kerguelen (S. virgata), and Antarctic (S. vittata) terns.

The immature plumages of the Arctic tern were originally described as separate species, Sterna portlandica and Sterna pikei.

== Reproduction ==
Breeding begins around the third or fourth year. Arctic terns mate for life and, in most cases, return to the same colony each year. Courtship is elaborate, especially in birds nesting for the first time. Courtship begins with a so-called "high flight", where a female will chase the male to a high altitude and then slowly descend. This display is followed by "fish flights", where the male will offer fish to the female. Courtship on the ground involves strutting with a raised tail and lowered wings. After this, both birds will usually fly and circle each other.

Both sexes agree on a site for a nest, and both will defend the site. During this time, the male continues to feed the female. Mating occurs shortly after this. Breeding takes place in colonies on coasts, islands and occasionally inland on tundra near water. It often forms mixed flocks with the common tern. It lays from one to three eggs per clutch, most often two.

It is one of the most aggressive terns, fiercely defensive of its nest and young. It will attack humans and large predators, usually striking the top or back of the head. Although it is too small to cause serious injury to an animal of a human's size, it is still capable of drawing blood, and is capable of repelling many raptorial birds, polar bears and smaller mammalian predators such as foxes and cats.

The nest is usually a depression in the ground, which may or may not be lined with bits of grass or similar materials. The eggs are mottled and camouflaged. Both sexes share incubation duties. The young hatch after 22–27 days and fledge after 21–24 days. If the parents are disturbed and flush from the nest frequently the incubation period could be extended to as long as 34 days.

When hatched, the chicks are downy. Being precocial, the chicks begin to move around and explore their surroundings within one to three days after hatching. Usually they do not stray far from the nest. Chicks are brooded by the adults for the first ten days after hatching. Both parents care for hatchlings. Chick diets always include fish, and parents selectively bring larger prey items to chicks than they eat themselves. Males bring more food than females. Feeding by the parents lasts for roughly a month before being weaned off slowly. After fledging, the juveniles learn to feed themselves, including the difficult method of plunge-diving. They will fly south to winter with the help of their parents.

Arctic terns are long-lived birds that spend considerable time raising only a few young, and are thus said to be K-selected. A 1957 study in the Farne Islands estimated an annual survival rate of 82%.

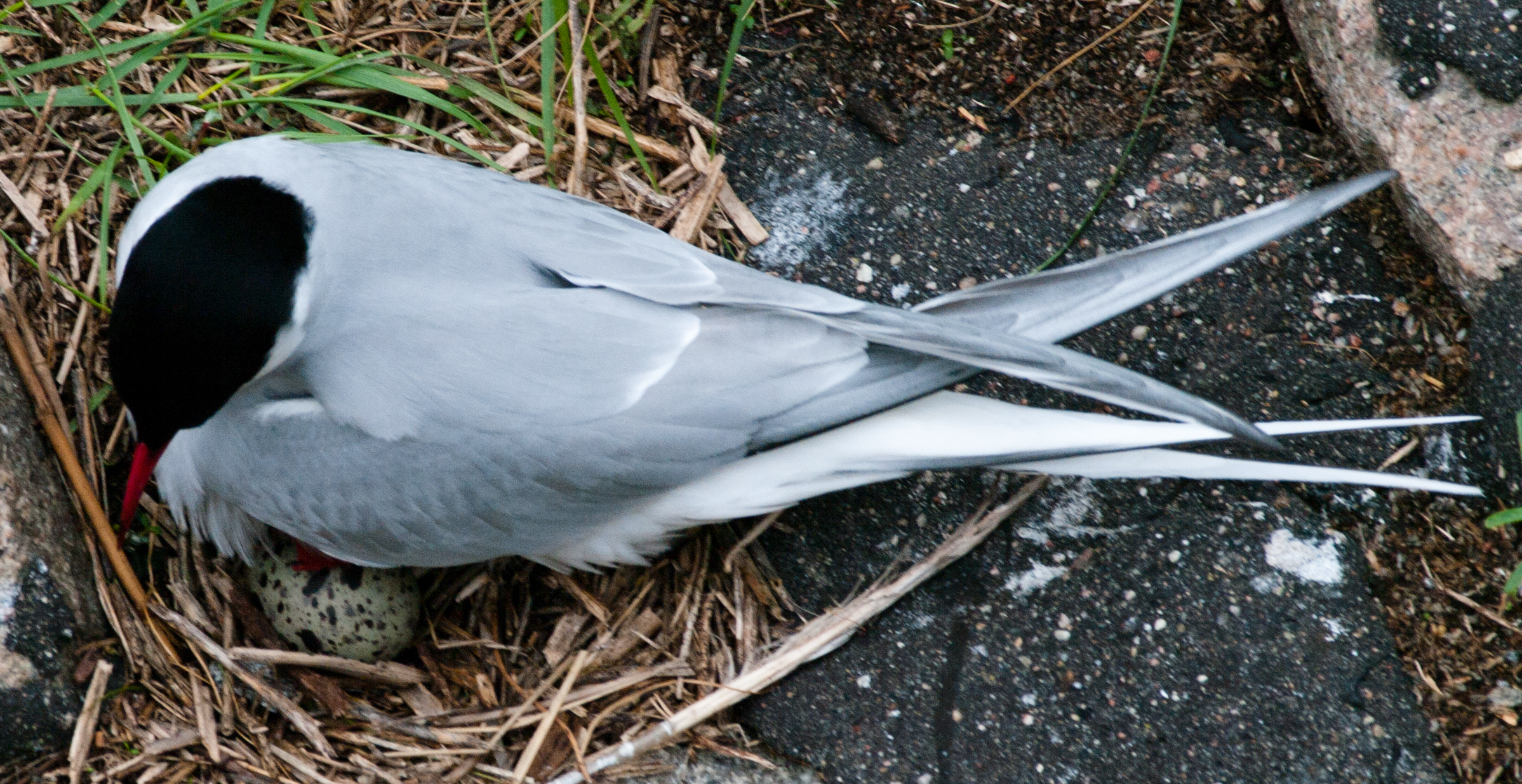
Nesting with an egg

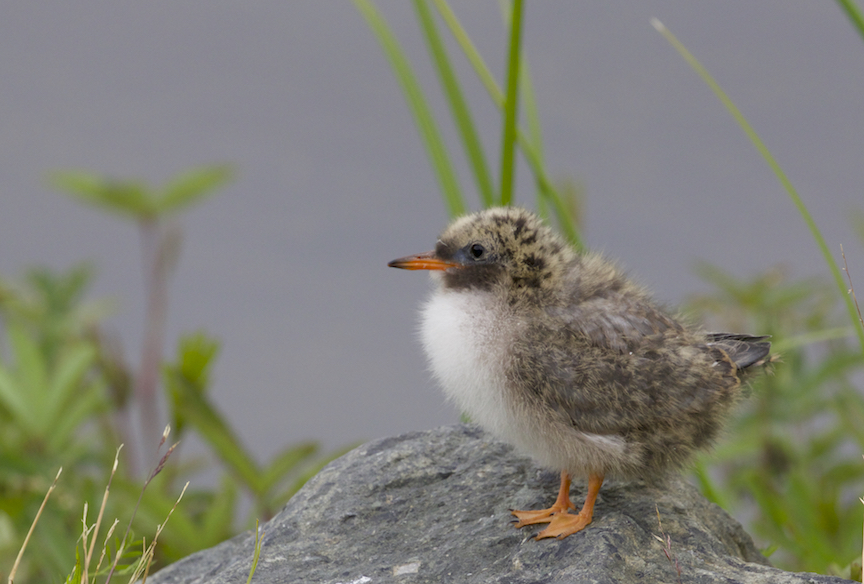
chick

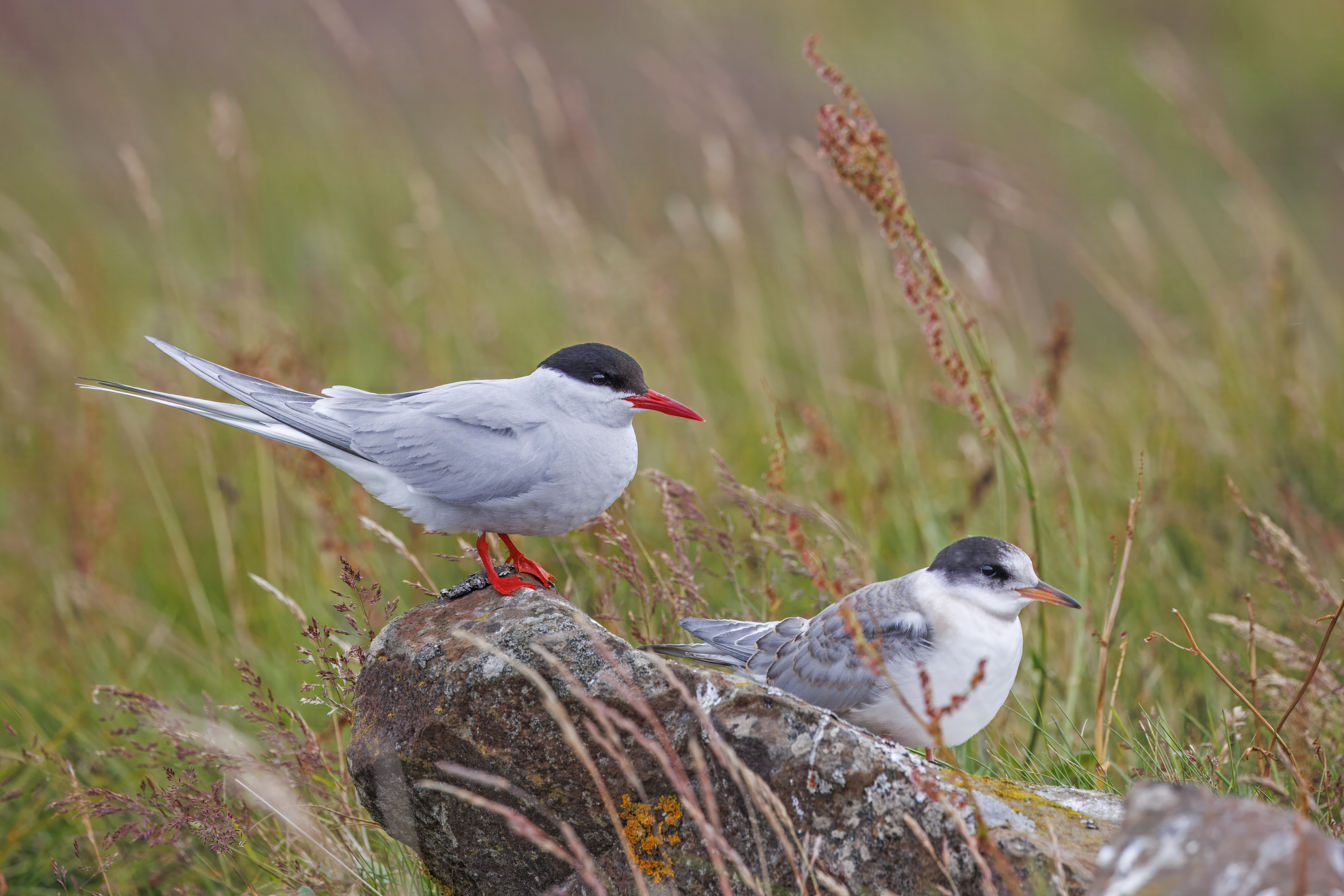
adult with juvenile

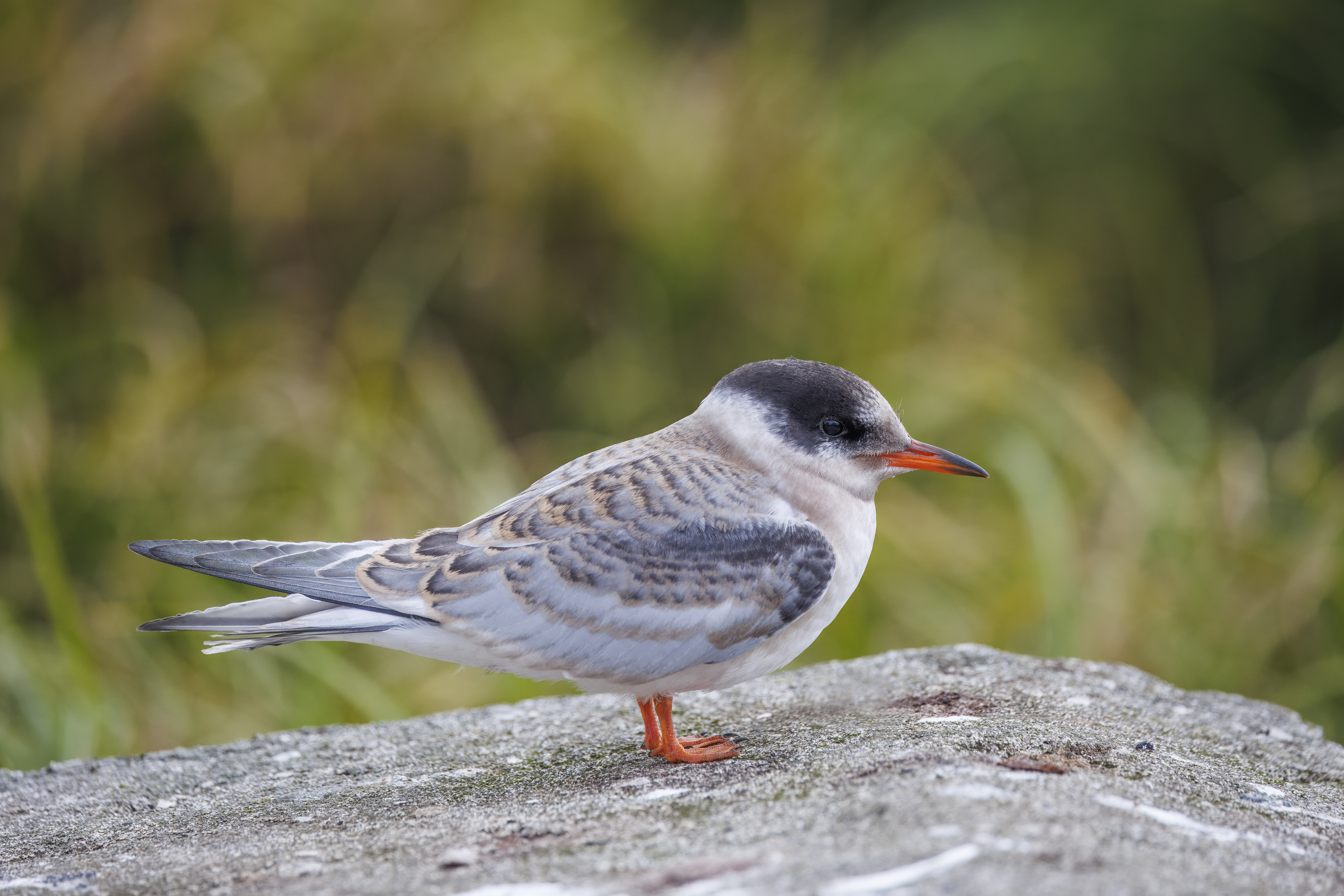
juvenile

== Ecology and behaviour ==
The diet of the Arctic tern varies depending on location and time, but is usually carnivorous. In most cases, it eats small fish or marine crustaceans. Fish species comprise the most important part of the diet, and account for more of the biomass consumed than any other food. Prey species are immature (1–2-year-old) shoaling species such as herring, cod, sandlances, and capelin. Among the marine crustaceans eaten are amphipods, crabs and krill. Sometimes, these birds also eat molluscs, marine worms, or berries, and on their northern breeding grounds, insects.

Arctic terns sometimes dip down to the surface of the water to catch prey close to the surface. They may also chase insects in the air when breeding. It is also thought that Arctic terns may, in spite of their small size, occasionally engage in kleptoparasitism by swooping at birds so as to startle them into releasing their catches. Several species are targeted—conspecifics, other terns (like the common tern), and some auk and grebe species.

While nesting, Arctic terns are vulnerable to predation by cats and other animals. Besides being a competitor for nesting sites, the larger herring gull steals eggs and hatchlings. Camouflaged eggs help prevent this, as do isolated nesting sites. Scientists have experimented with bamboo canes erected around tern nests. Although they found fewer predation attempts in the caned areas than in the control areas, canes did not reduce the probability of predation success per attempt. While feeding, skuas, gulls, and other tern species will often harass the birds and steal their food.

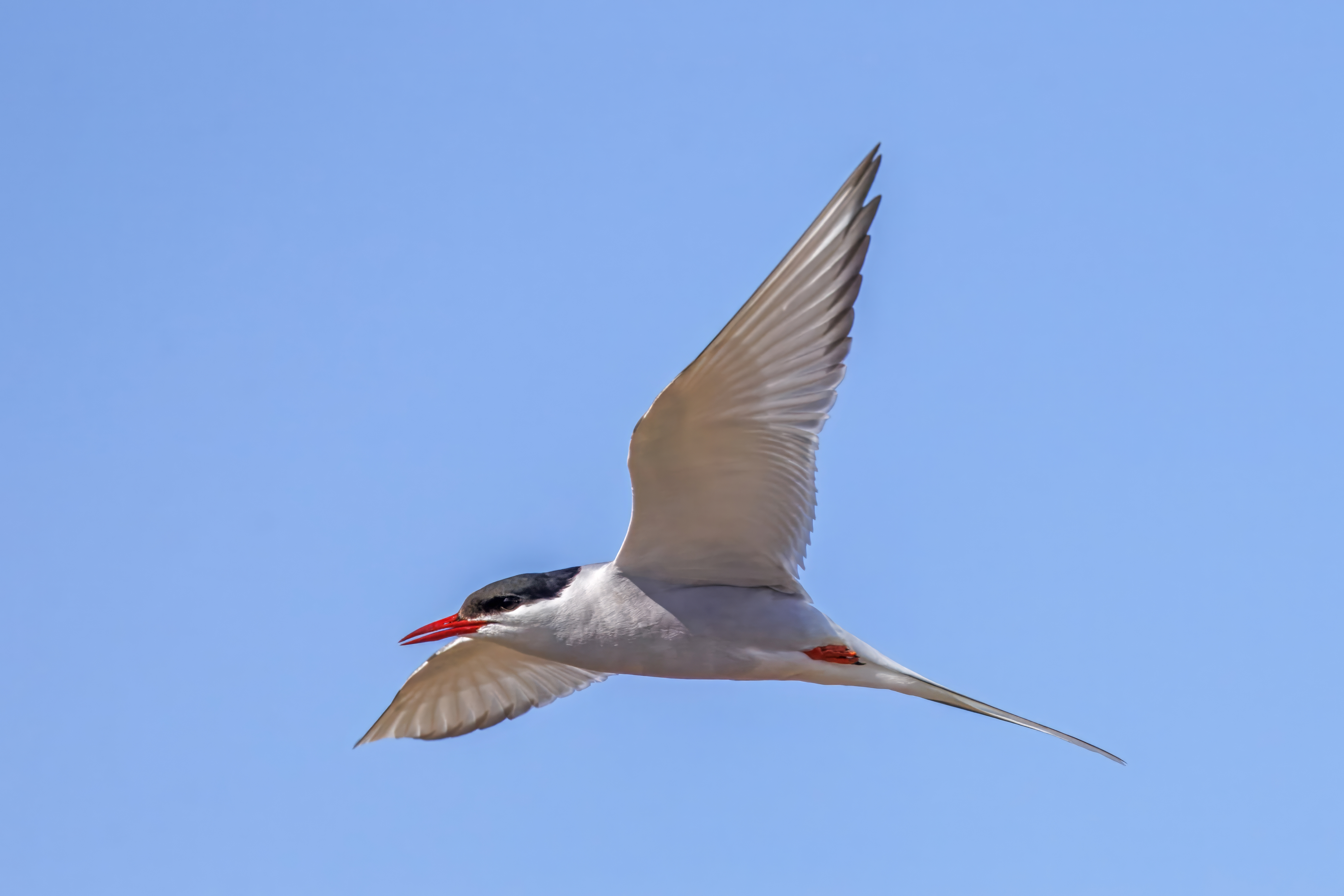
adult

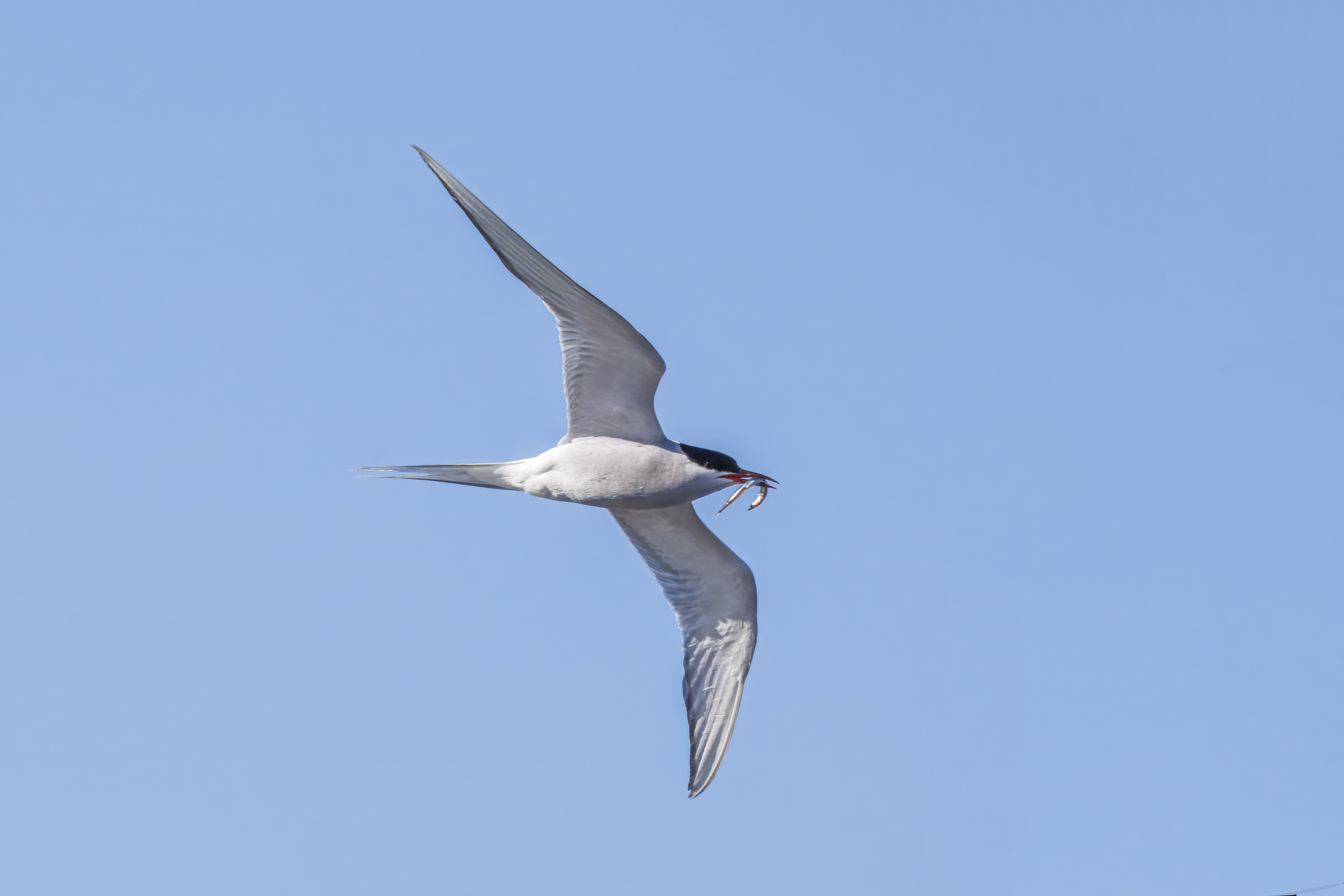
with an eel

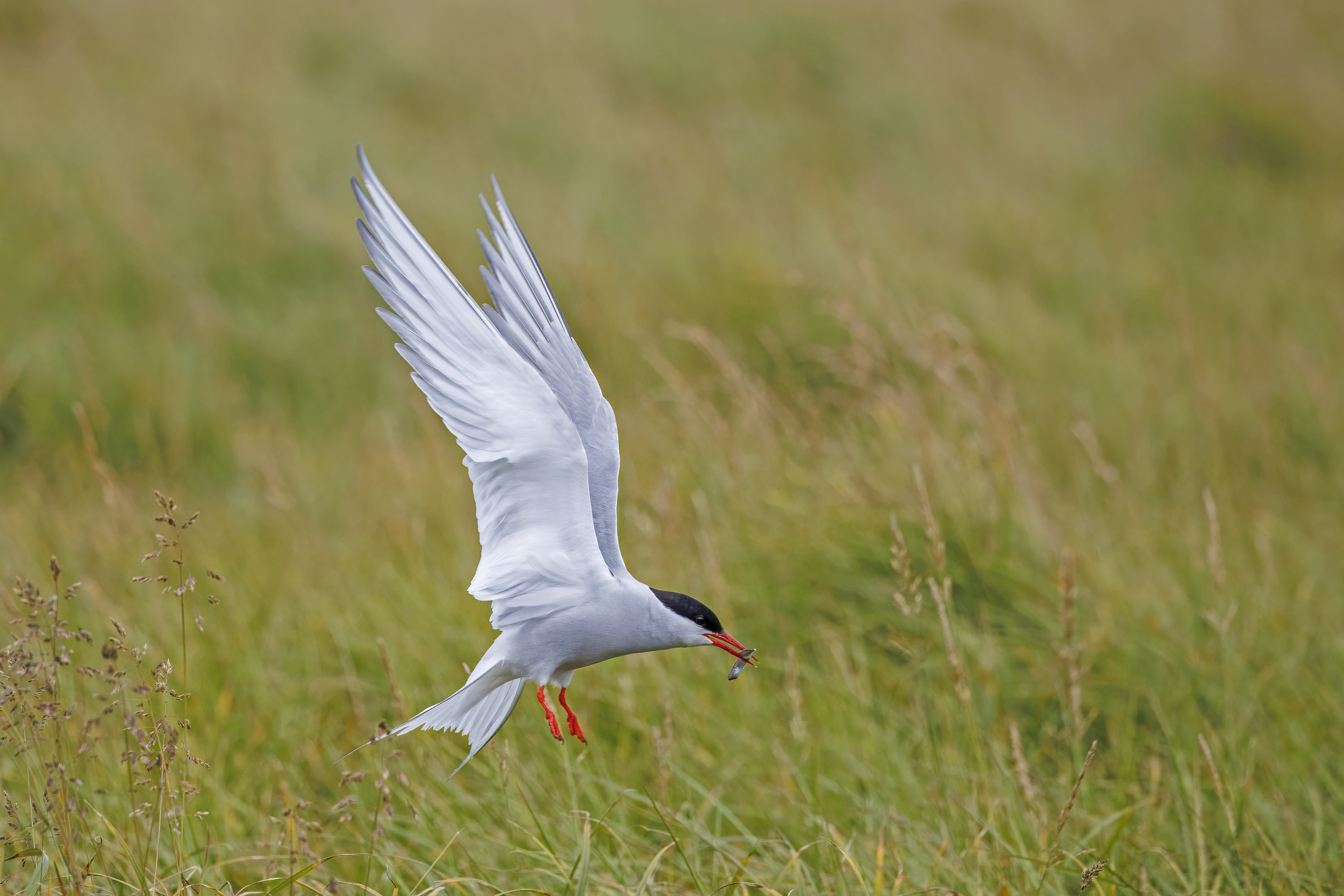
hovering with food over nest

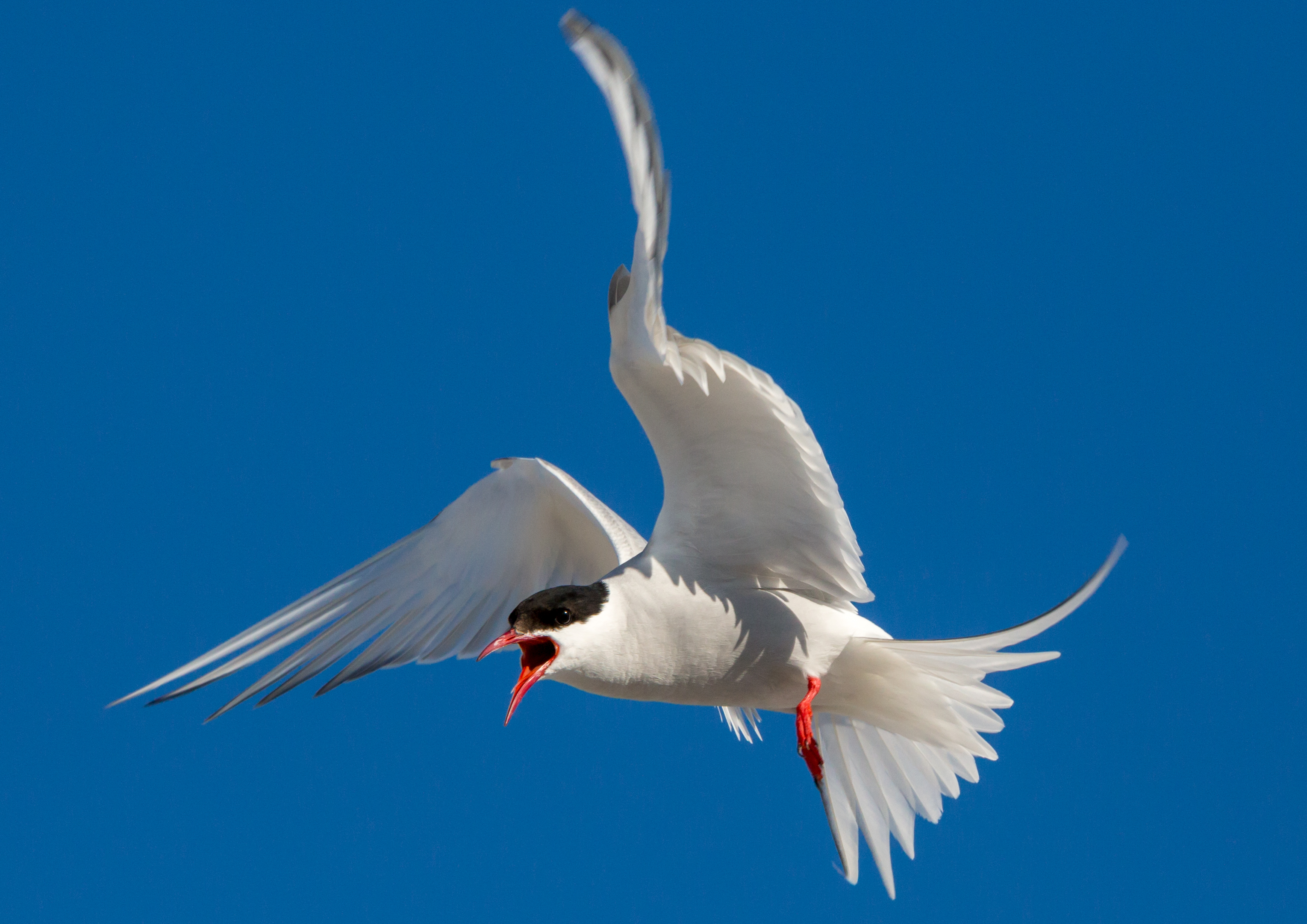
defending its offspring

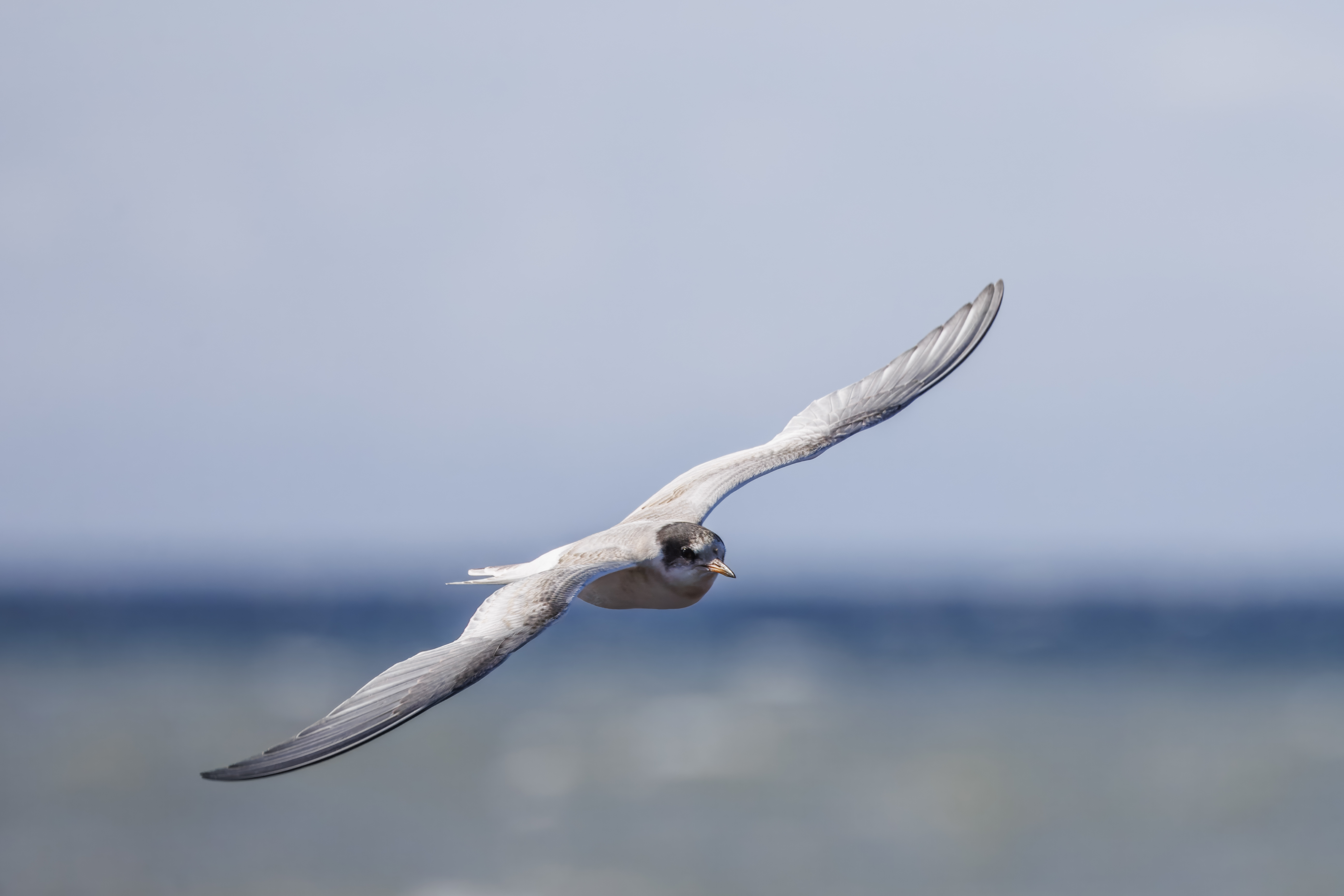
juvenile

== Conservation status ==
The total population of the Arctic tern is estimated at more than two million individuals, with more than half of the population in Europe. The breeding range is very large, and although the population is considered to be decreasing, this species is evaluated as a species of least concern by the IUCN. Arctic terns are among the species to which the Agreement on the Conservation of African-Eurasian Migratory Waterbirds applies.

The population in New England was reduced in the late nineteenth-century because of hunting for the millinery trade. Exploitation continues in western Greenland, where the population of the species has been reduced greatly since 1950. In Iceland, the Arctic tern has been regionally uplisted to vulnerable as of 2018, due to the crash of sand eel (Ammodytes spp.) stocks.

In the southern part of its range, the Arctic tern has been declining in numbers. Much of this is due to a lack of food. However, most of these birds' range is extremely remote, with no apparent trend in the species as a whole. The Arctic terns' dispersal pattern is affected by changing climatic conditions, and its ability to feed in its Antarctic wintering is dependent on sea-ice cover, but unlike breeding species, it is able to move to a different area if necessary, and can be used as a control to investigate the effect of climate change on breeding species.

== Cultural depictions ==
The Arctic tern has appeared on the postage stamps of several countries and dependent territories. The territories include Åland, Alderney, and Faroe Islands. Countries include Canada, Finland, Iceland, and Cuba.

The Arctic tern was featured prominently in a sketch on the improv comedy television show Whose Line Is It Anyway? involving Colin Mochrie and Ryan Stiles. In the sketch, Mochrie compared the call of the Arctic tern to the sound of the boy band name Backstreet Boys.

A European constellation of weather satellites in polar orbits is named EPS-Sterna in reference to the bird's long migrations.
