= NASA Earth Science =

NASA research program

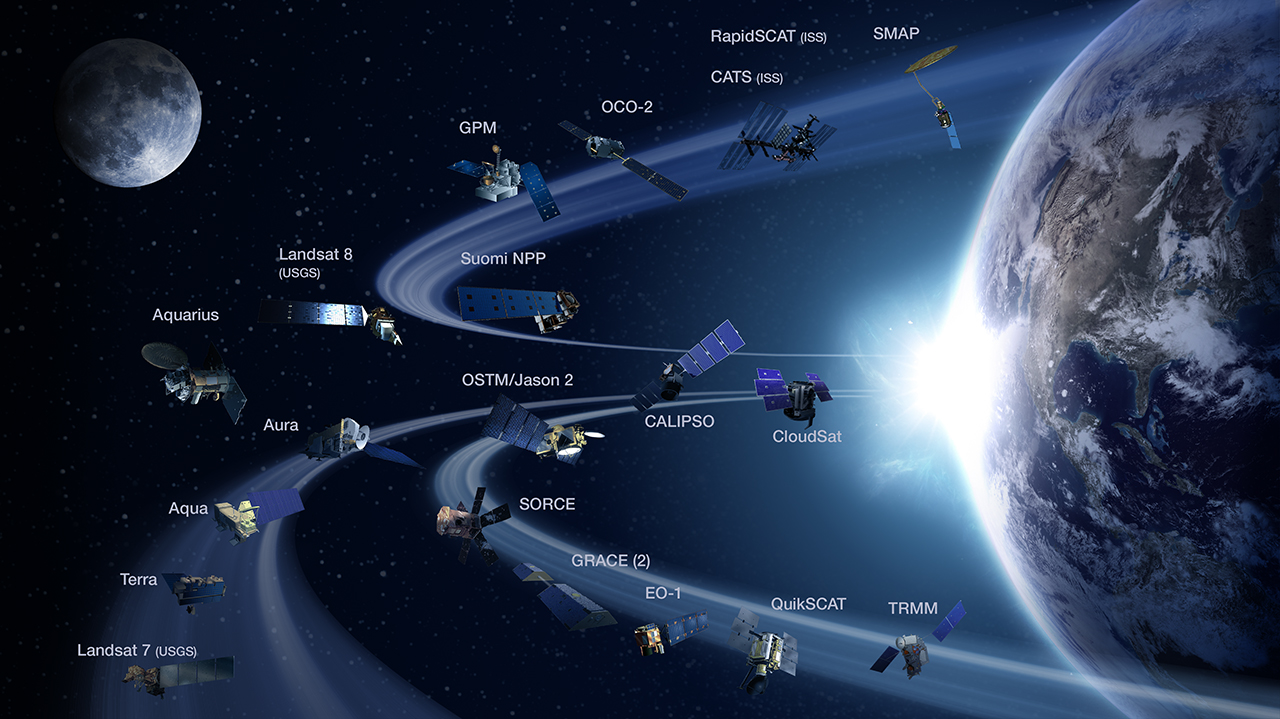
Schematic of NASA Earth Science Division operating satellite missions as of February 2015.

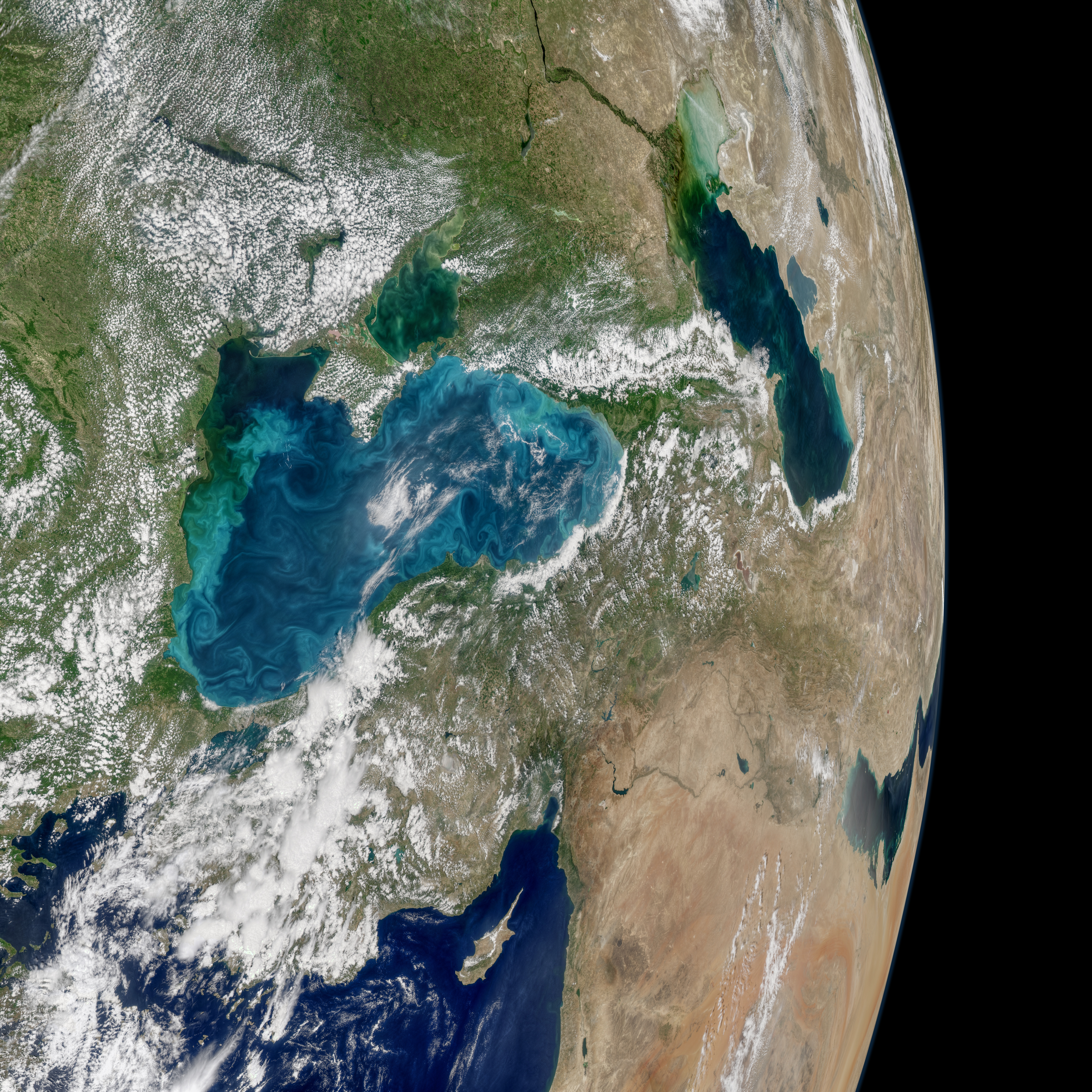
Satellite image from MODIS-Aqua from May 2017 shows Earth's surface including clouds, forests, islands, deserts, the deep blue Mediterranean Sea, and swirls of phytoplankton in the Black Sea, Caspian Sea, and Persian Gulf.

NASA Earth Science, formerly called NASA Earth Science Enterprise (ESE) and Mission To Planet Earth (MTPE), is a NASA research program "to develop a scientific understanding of the Earth system and its response to natural and human-induced changes to enable improved prediction of climate, weather, and natural hazards for present and future generations".

NASA supports research in the Earth sciences and, as part of its Earth Observing System (EOS), launches and maintains Earth observing satellites to monitor the state of the climate, atmospheric chemistry, ocean and land ecosystems. It was a NASA scientist, Dr. James Hansen, who first alerted the world to the dangers of global warming due to greenhouse gases emitted by human burning of fossil fuels. Earth Science research also provides the foundations of understanding for the search for extraterrestrial life through the NASA Astrobiology Institute (NAI), in which the focus is often on the extreme conditions for life to survive.

== Directors ==
- Michael Freilich (2006–2019)
