= EUMETSAT =

European intergovernmental organisation

European Organisation for the Exploitation of Meteorological Satellites
- Logo since 2020

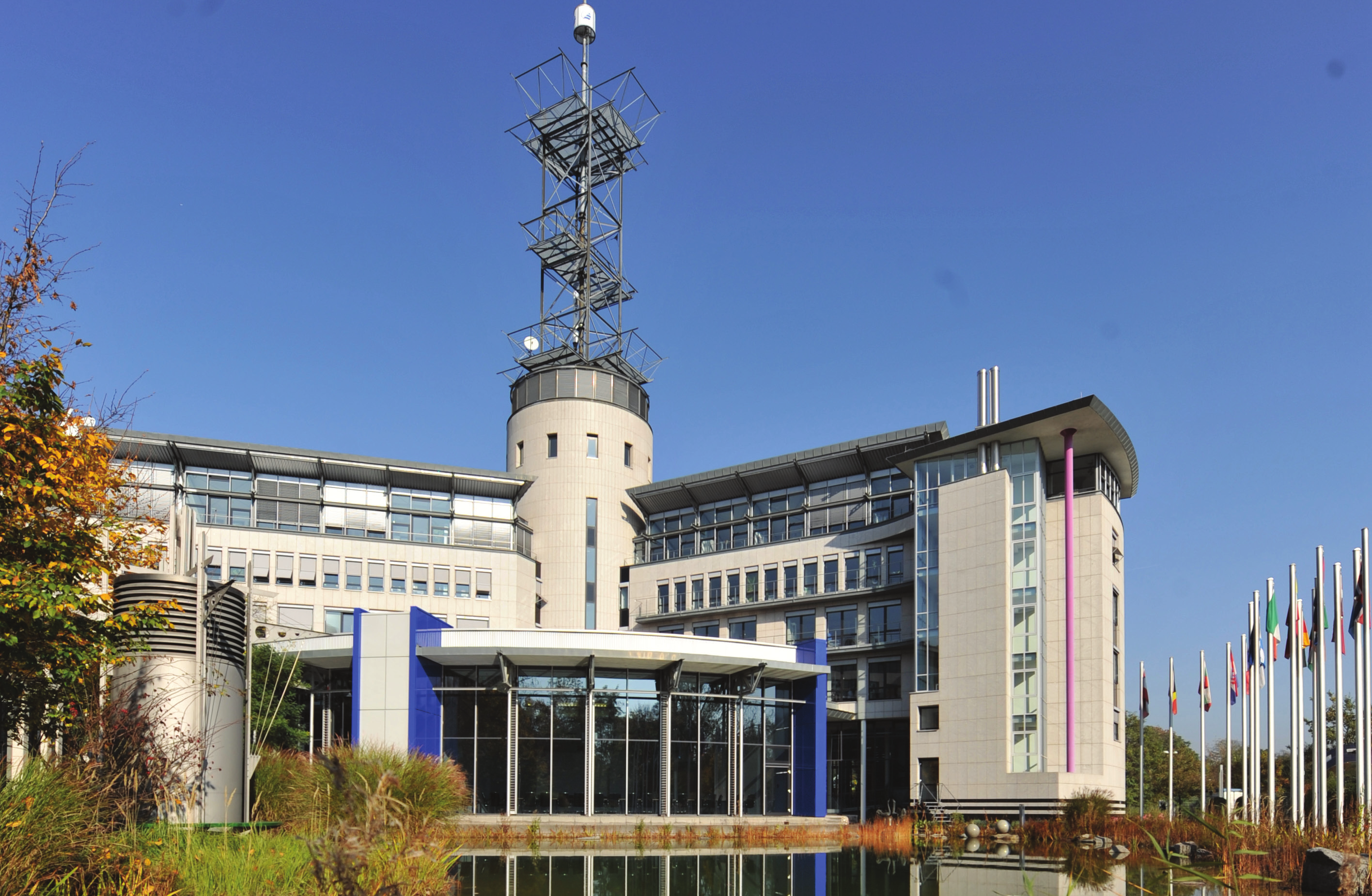
- Headquarters

- Member states Cooperating states
- Formation: 1986
- Headquarters: Darmstadt, Germany
- Coordinates: 49.865436°N 8.629148°E
- Members: 30 member states: Austria; Belgium; Bulgaria; Croatia; Czechia; Denmark; Estonia; Finland; France; Germany; Greece; Hungary; Iceland; Ireland; Italy; Latvia; Lithuania; Luxembourg; Netherlands; Norway; Poland; Portugal; Romania; Slovakia; Slovenia; Spain; Sweden; Switzerland; Türkiye; United Kingdom
- Official language: English, German and French
- Website: www.eumetsat.int

The European Organisation for the Exploitation of Meteorological Satellites (EUMETSAT) is an intergovernmental organisation created through an international convention agreed by a current total of 30 European Member States.

EUMETSAT's primary objective is to establish, maintain and exploit European systems of operational meteorological satellites. EUMETSAT is responsible for the launch and operation of the satellites and for delivering satellite data to end-users as well as contributing to the operational monitoring of climate and the detection of global climate changes.

The activities of EUMETSAT contribute to a global meteorological satellite observing system coordinated with other space-faring states.

Satellite observations are an essential input to numerical weather prediction systems and also assist the human forecaster in the diagnosis of potentially hazardous weather developments. Of growing importance is the capacity of weather satellites to gather long-term measurements from space in support of climate change studies.

EUMETSAT is not an institution or agency of the European Union, although the majority of its members are EU member states. The organisation became a signatory to the International Charter on Space and Major Disasters in 2012, thus providing for the global charitable use of its space assets.

== Member and cooperating states ==
The national mandatory contributions of member states are proportional to their gross national income. However, the cooperating countries contribute only half of the fee they would pay for full membership. The convention establishing EUMETSAT was opened for signature in 1983 and entered into force on 19 June 1986.

Country	Signatory date	Organization
(European Union) Germany	1986, March	Deutscher Wetterdienst (DWD)
United Kingdom	1985, May	Met Office
(European Union) France	1985, February	Météo-France
(European Union) Italy	1986, June	Ufficio Generale Spazio Aereo e Meteorologia (USAM) – Reparto Meteorologia
(European Union) Spain	1985, February	Agencia Estatal de Meteorología (AEMET)
(European Union) Netherlands	1984, March	Koninklijk Nederlands Meteorologisch Instituut (KNMI)
Switzerland	1985, July	MeteoSchweiz / MétéoSuisse / MeteoSvizzera
(European Union) Belgium	1985, October	Institut Royal Météorologique de Belgique (IRM) / Koninklijk Meteorologisch Instituut van België (KMI)
(European Union) Sweden	1984, January	Sveriges meteorologiska och hydrologiska institut (SMHI)
Turkey	1984, August	Remote Sensing Division, Devlet Meteoroloji İşleri Genel Müdürlüğü (DMİGM)
(European Union) Austria	1993, December	GeoSphere Austria
Norway	1985, April	Meteorologisk institutt (met.no)
(European Union) Poland	2009, June	Instytut Meteorologii i Gospodarki Wodnej (IMGW)
(European Union) Denmark	1984, January	Danmarks Meteorologiske Institut (DMI)
(European Union) Greece	1988, June	Εθνική Μετεωρολογική Υπηρεσία (HNMS)
(European Union) Finland	1984, December	Ilmatieteen laitos / Meteorologiska institutet (FMI)
(European Union) Portugal	1989, May	Instituto de Meteorologia (IM)
(European Union) Ireland	1985, June	Met Éireann
(European Union) Czech Republic	2010, May	Český hydrometeorologický ústav (CHMI), Družicové Oddělení
(European Union) Hungary	2008, October	Országos Meteorológiai Szolgálat (OMSZ)
(European Union) Romania	2010, November	National Meteorological Administration of Romania
(European Union) Slovakia	2006, January	Slovenský hydrometeorologický ústav (SHMU)
(European Union) Croatia	2006, December	Državni hidrometeorološki zavod (DHMZ)
(European Union) Slovenia	2008, February	Agencija Republike Slovenije za Okolje (ARSO)
(European Union) Luxembourg	2002, July	Administration de la navigation aérienne
(European Union) Latvia	2009, May	Latvijas Vides, ģeoloģijas un meteoroloģijas aģentūra (LVGMA)
(European Union) Lithuania	2014, January	Lietuvos hidrometeorologijos tarnyba (LHMT), prie Aplinkos ministerijos
Iceland	2014, January	Veðurstofa Íslands
(European Union) Estonia	2013, June	Estonian Weather Service
(European Union) Bulgaria	2014, April	Национален институт по метеорология и хидрология (NIMH)
Last update published 2014

== Satellite programmes ==
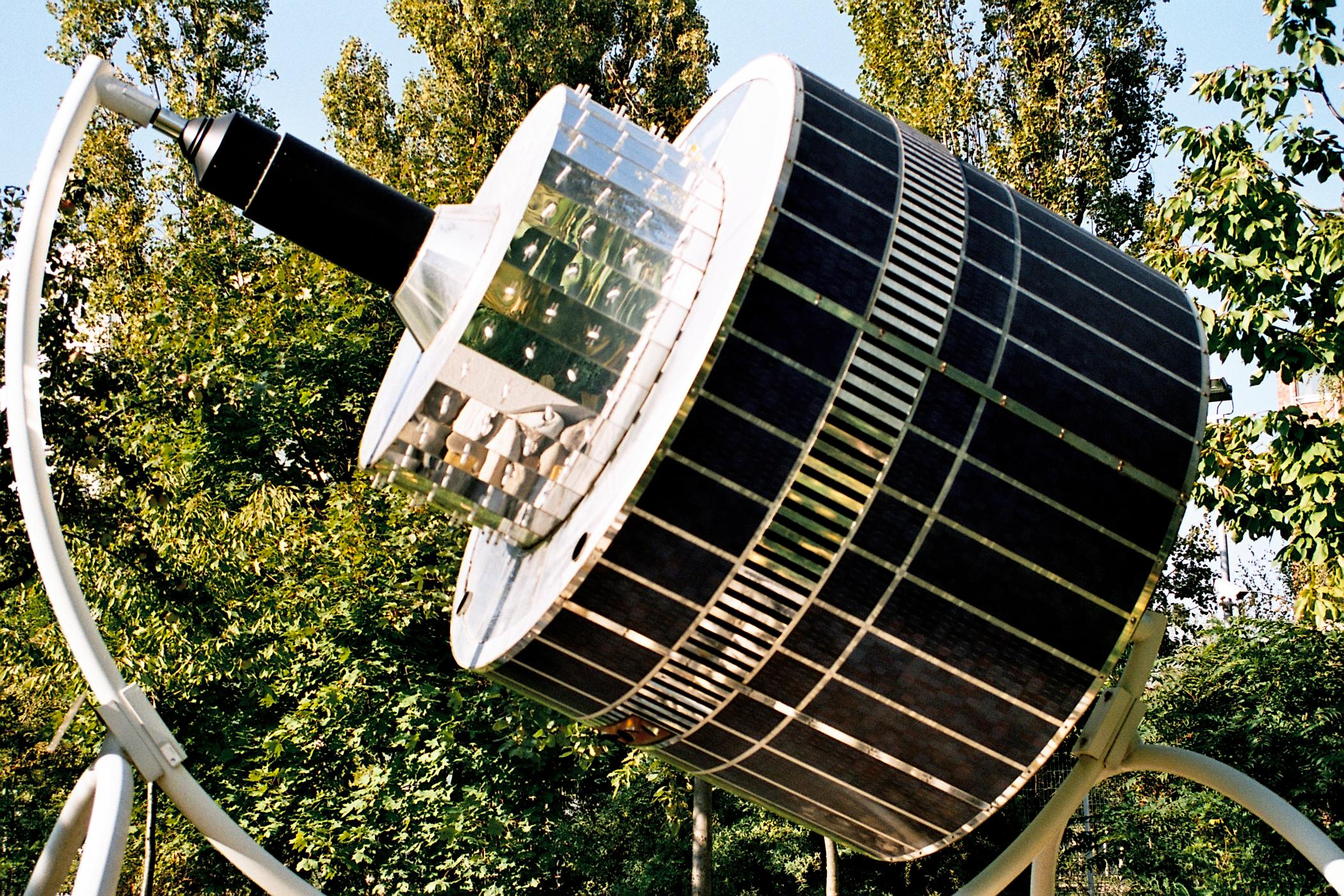
Model of a first generation Meteosat geostationary satellite. EUMETSAT site, Darmstadt, Germany, 2006.

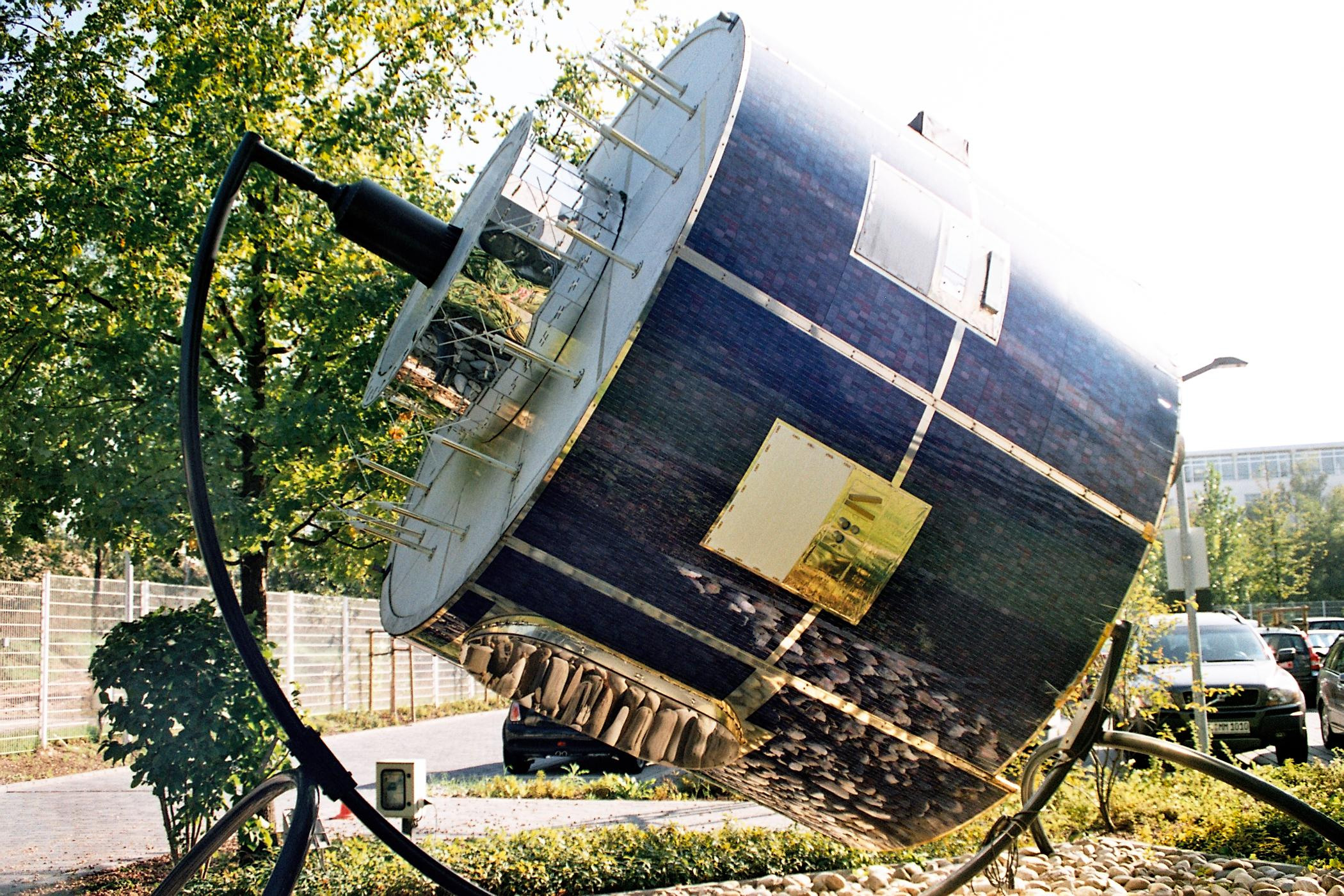
Model of a second generation Meteosat geostationary satellite. EUMETSAT site, Darmstadt, Germany, 2006.

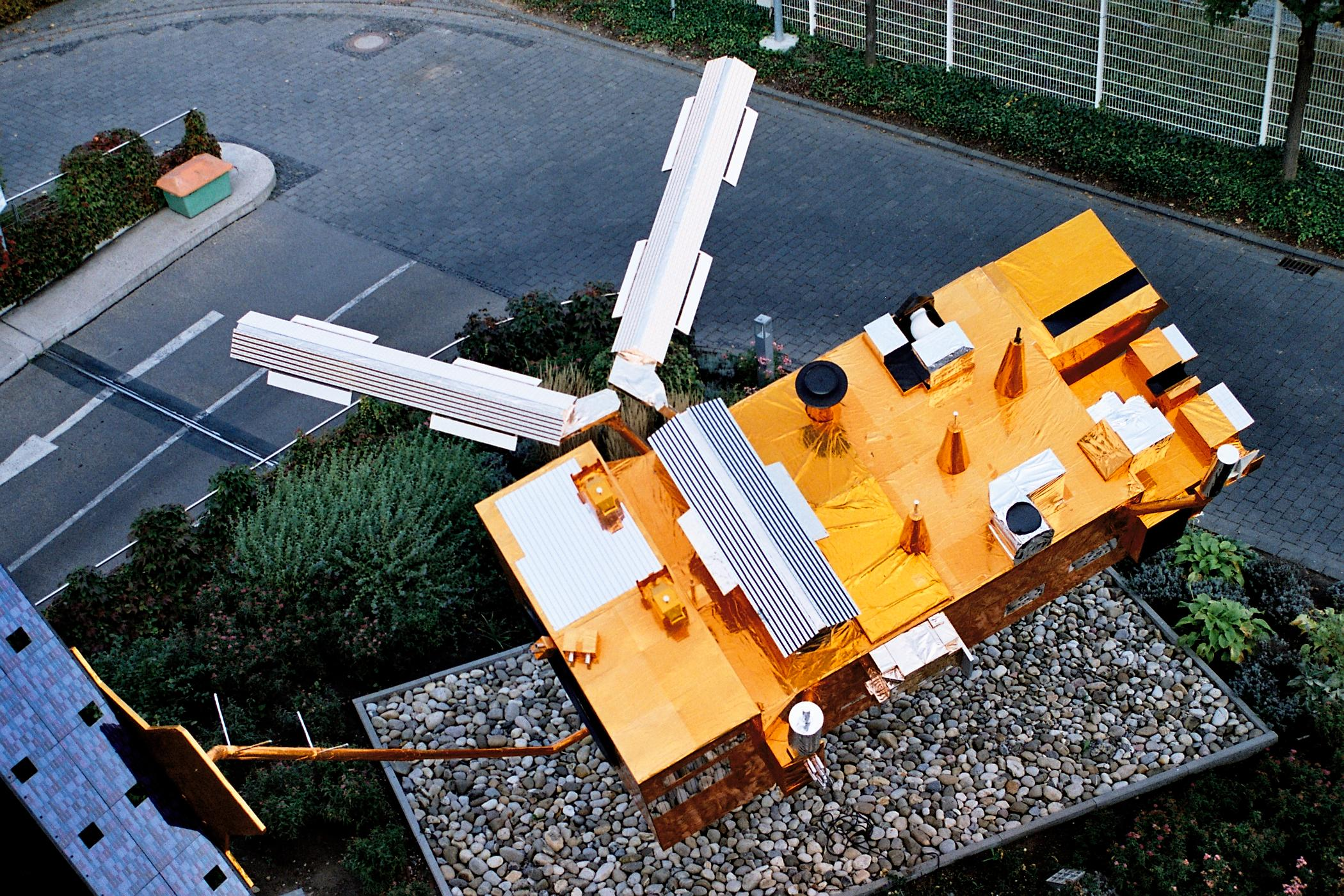
Model of a MetOp polar satellite (MetOp refers to the Meteorological Operational Satellite Program of Europe, bottom up). EUMETSAT site, Darmstadt, Germany, 2006.

There are two types of programmes:

- Geostationary satellites, providing a continuous view of the Earth disc from a stationary position in space.
- Polar-orbiting satellites, flying at a much lower altitude, sending back more precise details about atmospheric temperature and moisture profiles, although with less frequent global coverage.

=== Geostationary satellites ===
The provision of geostationary satellite data for european weather forecasting and climate monitoring is enabled by the Meteosat series of satellites, operated by EUMETSAT, generating images of the full Earth disc and data for forecasting.

The first generation of Meteosat, launched in 1977, provided continuous, reliable observations to a large user group. In response to demand for more frequent and comprehensive data, Meteosat Second Generation (MSG) was developed with key improvements in swift recognition and prediction of thunderstorms, fog, and the small depressions which can lead to dangerous windstorms. The first MSG satellite was launched in 2002. The Meteosat Third Generation satellites, first launched in 2022, will continue this provision of data into the 2040s, with increased resolution, faster data delivery and increased diversity of data.

=== Polar-orbiting satellites ===
==== EUMETSAT Polar System ====
The lack of observational coverage in certain parts of the globe, particularly the Pacific Ocean and continents of the Southern Hemisphere, led to the increasingly important role for polar-orbiting satellite data in numerical weather prediction and climate monitoring.

EUMETSAT Polar System (EPS) Metop mission consists of three polar orbiting MetOp satellites, to be flown successively for more than 14 years. The first, Metop-A, was launched by a Russian Soyuz-2.1a rocket from Baikonur on October 19, 2006, at 22:28 Baikonur time (16:28 UTC). Metop-A was initially controlled by ESOC for the LEOP phase immediately following launch, with control handed over to EUMETSAT 72 hours after lift-off. EUMETSAT's first commands to the satellite were sent at 14:04 UTC on October 22, 2006.

The second EPS satellite, Metop-B, was launched from Baikonur on 17 September 2012, and the third, Metop-C, was launched from Centre Spatial Guyanais in Kourou, French Guiana on 7 November 2018 by Arianespace using a Soyuz ST-B launch vehicle with a Fregat-M upper stage.

Positioned approximately 817 km (508 mi) above the Earth, instruments on board Metop deliver far more precise details about atmospheric temperature and moisture profiles than a geostationary satellite. The satellites also ensure that the more remote regions of the globe, particularly in Northern Europe as well as the oceans in the Southern Hemisphere, are fully covered.

The EPS programme formed the European half of a joint program with NOAA, called the Initial Joint Polar System (IJPS), with many of the instruments on Metop also operated on NOAA/POES satellites, providing similar data types across the IJPS.

Metop-A was decommissioned in November 2021 after fifteen years in orbit, well in excess of its intended 5-year operational lifetime. The remaining satellites, Metop-B and Metop-C are foreseen to continue supporting the EPS mission until approx. 2034.

===== Instruments on MetOp =====
- A/DCS (Advanced Data Collection System)
- AMSU-A1 and AMSU-A2
- ASCAT Advanced Scatterometer
- AVHRR (Advanced Very High Resolution Radiometer)
- GOME-2 (Global Ozone Monitoring Experiment) — instrument to monitor ozone levels
- GRAS (GNSS Receiver for Atmospheric Sounding: global navigation satellite systems radio occultation)
- HIRS (High Resolution Infrared Sounder)
- IASI (Infrared atmospheric sounding interferometer)
- MHS (Microwave Humidity Sounder)
- SARP-3 and SARR (Search And Rescue Processor and Search And Rescue Repeater)
- SEM (Space Environment Monitor, to measure the intensity of the Earth's radiation belts and the proton/electron flux.)

==== Jason / Sentinel-6 ====
Jason-2

The Jason-2 programme is an international partnership across multiple organisations, including EUMETSAT, CNES, and the US agencies NASA and NOAA. Jason-2 was launched successfully from Vandenberg Air Force Base aboard a Delta-II rocket on 20 June 2008, 7:46 UTC. EUMETSAT – What We Do – Jason-2 – Launch Description

Jason-2 reliably delivers detailed oceanographic data vital to our understanding of weather forecasting and climate change monitoring. Jason-2 provides data on the decadal (10-yearly) oscillations in large ocean basins, such as the Atlantic Ocean; mesoscale variability, and surface wind and wave conditions. Jason-2 measurements contribute to the European Centre for Medium-Range Weather Forecasts (ECMWF) satellite data assimilation, helping improve global atmosphere and ocean forecasting.

Altimetric data from Jason-2 have also helped create detailed decade-long global observations and analyses of the El Niño and La Niña phenomena, opening the way to new discoveries about ocean circulation and its effects on climate, and providing new insights into ocean tides, turbulent ocean eddies and marine gravity.

Jason-3

Jason-3 was launched on 17 January 2016, Vandenberg Air Force Base in California, on a SpaceX Falcon 9 launcher. It is operational since 14 October 2016. Jason-3 is on a non-Sun-synchronous low Earth orbit at 66° inclination and 1336 km altitude, optimised to eliminate tidal aliasing from sea surface height and mean sea level measurements. Jason-2, flies on the same orbit but at 162°. It is built on the same cooperation as Jason-2, involving EUMETSAT, NOAA, CNES and NASA, with Copernicus expected to support the European contribution to operations, as part of its HPOA activity, which also covers contributions to the Jason-CS programme.

Sentinel-6/Jason-CS

The Jason satellites were succeeded by the Sentinel-6 for the radar altimeter mission, part of the European Union's Copernicus Programme for Earth observation, with the objective of providing an operational service for high-precision measurements of global sea-level. This mission is implemented as a multi-partner cooperation between the European Commission and EUMETSAT, ESA, NOAA and NASA, with support from the French space agency, CNES.

The mission, implemented through the two Sentinel-6/Jason-CS satellites (Sentinel-6 Michael Freilich and Sentinel-6B), aims to continue high precision ocean altimetry measurements in the 2020–2030 time-frame. A secondary objective is to collect high resolution vertical profiles of temperature, using the GNSS Radio-Occultation sounding technique, to assess temperature changes in the troposphere and stratosphere and to support Numerical Weather Prediction.

The launch of the first satellite – Sentinel-6A Michael Freilich – occurred successfully on 21 November 2020 from Vandenberg AFB in California, USA on a SpaceX Falcon-9 launch vehicle. The satellite was named in honour of Michael Freilich (oceanographer), an oceanographer and former director of NASA's Earth Science Division. Sentinel-6 Michael Freilich succeeded Jason-3 as the reference mission for satellite ocean altimetry in April 2022.

The launch of Sentinel-6B took place in November 2025, also on a SpaceX Falcon-9 from Vandenberg Space Force Base. Sentinel-6B is foreseen to replace Sentinel-6A Michael Freilich as the prime satellite for the reference ocean altimetry mission in 2027. Thereafter, Sentinel-6A will move to an interleaved orbit, providing increased geospatial coverage and reduced revisit times.

== See also ==
- EUMETNET
- the European Centre for Medium-Range Weather Forecasts (ECMWF)
- the French CNES (CNES)
- the US National Oceanic and Atmospheric Administration (NOAA), the US equivalent of EUMETSAT
- the US NASA (NASA), the US equivalent of the ESA
