= Marine Sciences Research Center =

- Company type: Non-profit organization
- Founded: 1996, Stony Brook, New York, U.S.
- Headquarters: Stony Brook, New York
- Key people: Larry Swanson, Director
- Website: Official website

Marine Sciences Research Center is a research center at Stony Brook University. The center studies coastal oceanographic processes and atmospheric sciences.

In 1997 the center was awarded grants of $7.1 million, including more than $1.9 million from the National Science Foundation alone.
