= Hyperspectral Imager for the Coastal Ocean =

Observation sensor on the International Space Station

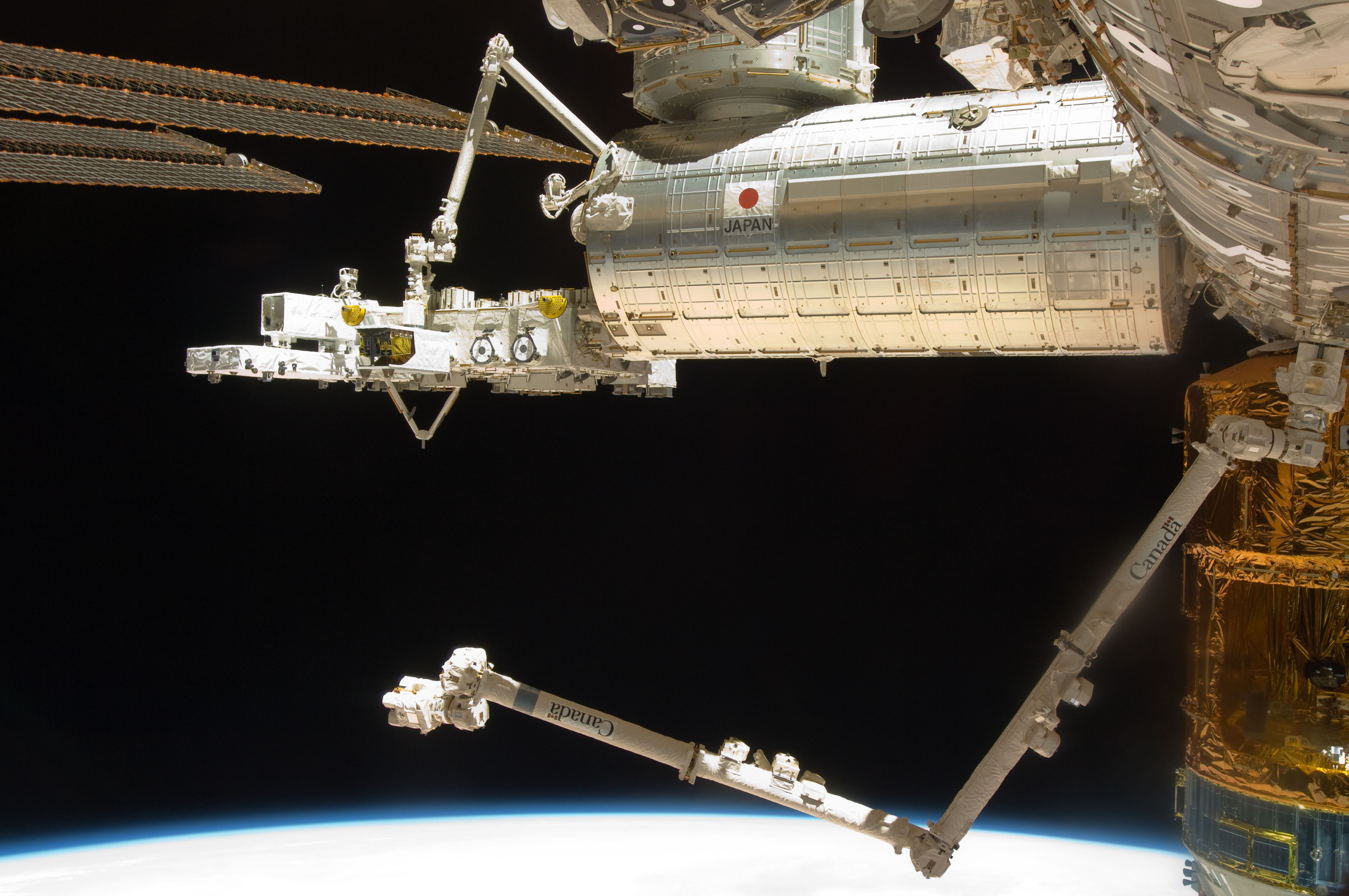
Hyperspectral Imager for the Coastal Ocean (HICO) on the International Space Station.

The Hyperspectral Imager for the Coastal Ocean (HICO) was a hyperspectral earth observation sensor that operated on the International Space Station (ISS) from 2009 to 2014. HICO collected hyperspectral satellite imagery of the Earth's surface from the ISS.

HICO was a pathfinder or proof-of-concept mission for hyperspectral imaging of the oceans, particularly for optically complex coastal waters. The dataset collected by HICO serves as an example dataset for future hyperspectral satellite missions such as PACE.

HICO was mounted directly on the ISS rather than on a separate unmanned satellite platform (i.e., distinct from the MODIS sensor mounted on Aqua and Terra satellites and from SeaWiFS mounted on OrbView-2 aka Seastar satellite). As such, HICO was tasked to collect images of certain regions in sync with the daytime orbit path of the ISS. Further, its data record may contain some gaps in time for operational tasks on board the ISS such as spacewalks and docking.

== History ==
HICO was developed by the United States Office of Naval Research. The sensor was launched on September 10, 2009, from the Tanegashima Space Center in Japan as payload for the ISS on the H-2B-304 rocket (including HTV-1 transfer vehicle). It was installed on September 24, 2009, onto the Japanese Experiment Module Exposed Facility of the Kibo Laboratory (Japanese Kibo complex) of the ISS by two Expedition-20 engineers, ESA astronaut Frank De Winne and NASA astronaut Nicole Stott. HICO was installed concurrently with the RAIDS/Remote Atmospheric and Ionospheric Detection System: together these two systems are referred to as the "HICO and RAIDS Experiment Payload (HREP or HREP-RAIDS)." HICO Collected over 10,000 images during its operating lifetime. Financial support came from the United States Office of Naval Research, the United States Department of Defense, and later from the International Space Station Program.

In summer 2013 HICO data became publicly available and remain freely accessible today.

HICO stopped collecting data in September 2014 when radiation from a solar flare damaged its computer. Attempts to restart the computer were unsuccessful. The last image date and official end of operations was September 13, 2014.

After the end of its lifetime, HICO and RAIDS Experiment Payload (HREP) was removed from the ISS on August 3, 2018, on the SpaceX CRS-15 Dragon space capsule after its July–August 2018 resupply mission. The Dragon's trunk section burned up during re-entry, disposing of the HICO instrument and other contents. The flight that offloaded HICO was the fourth ever round-trip cargo flight with a reused Dragon capsule.

== Technical specifications and data products ==
Hyperspectral imagery (right) uses more spectral bands or more colors of light, providing more information to identify different types of terrain.

Hyperspectral satellite sensors(right) detect light radiating from Earth's surface over the full spectrum of visible light, rather than at a few specific "bands" like RGB or multispectral sensors (left and middle).

=== Spectral coverage and resolution ===
HICO uses 128 spectral bands from approximately 353 nm to 1080 nm wavelengths at 5.7 nm spectral resolution (band centers 5.7 nm apart). Data from wavelengths less than 400 nm and greater than 900 nm are not recommended for analysis; 400-900 nm data are higher quality. A 10 nm smoothing filter is applied to wavelengths 400 to 745 nm and a 20 nm filter is applies to wavelengths 746 to 900 nm.

=== Spatial coverage and resolution ===
HICO pixels are approximately 90 meters in spatial resolution. Each full scene covers approximately a 42 by 192 km rectangle (varying with altitude and angle). High latitude regions of the Earth are not covered. The ISS accomplishes about sixteen 90-minute orbits per day, and the location of the track for orbit moves to the west as Earth rotates. The ISS orbit tracks over the same area on the ground about every three days, including nighttime overpasses. However, HICO imaging was limited to collect only one scene per orbit, resulting in about seven to eight daylight scenes per day, often spatially scattered throughout the world.

=== Radiometric resolution ===
HICO data have a signal-to-noise ratio of greater than 200-to-1 for water-penetrating wavelengths and assuming 5% albedo. The sensor had high sensitivity in the blue wavelengths and full coverage of water-penetrating wavelengths.

=== Temporal coverage and resolution ===
HICO collected satellite imagery from September 25, 2009, to September 13, 2014. A maximum of eight daylight scenes were collected per day. In any specific coastal region where scenes were imaged, temporal resolution is patchy. For example, over Chesapeake Bay on the United States east coast, 101 scenes were collected over the entire 5-year mission, and 16 scenes were imaged during the calendar year 2012.

=== Data products ===
HICO datasets, like other hyperspectral satellite datasets, are large in terms of data volume. For example, one HICO scene requires 120 MB to 700 MB of disk space (depending on format and compression). Data are available from NASA Ocean Color Web in HDF file format (similar to netCDF).

== Similar sensors ==
- Deutsches Zentrum fur Luft–und Raumfahrt German Aerospace Center (DLR) Earth Sensing Imaging Spectrometer (DESIS), installed on the International Space Station. This sensor is the most comparable to HICO because it is both hyperspectral and mounted on the ISS.

=== Other hyperspectral satellite sensors ===
(partial list)

- Hyperion, launched aboard the Earth Observing-1 (EO-1) spacecraft in 2000
- Compact High Resolution Imaging Spectrometer (CHRIS), on PROBA-1 in 2001
- Scanning Imaging Absorption Spectrometer for Atmospheric Chartography (SCIAMACHY) on ENVISAT from 2002 to 2012
- PRecursore IperSpettrale della Missione Applicativa (PRISMA), launched 2019 by the Italian Space Agency
- Advanced Hyperspectral Imager (AHSI), onboard China's GaoFen-5 satellite in 2018
- Hyperspectral Imaging Satellite (HySIS) launched from India in 2018
- HyperScout instruments launched on nanosatellites
- (Planned) Ocean Color Instrument (OCI) on the Plankton, Aerosols, Clouds, and ocean Ecosystems (PACE) satellite

=== Other Earth science instruments on the ISS ===
(partial list)

- ISS-RapidScat, which operated from 2014 to 2016.
- Total and Spectral Solar Irradiance Sensor 1 (TSIS-1), which was installed in 2013.
- SAGE III, installed in 2017.
- Lightning Imaging Sensor (LIS), installed in 2017.
- Global Ecosystem Dynamics Investigation (GEDI) full-waveform LIDAR, installed in 2018.
- ECOsystem Spaceborne Thermal Radiometer Experiment on Space Station (ECOSTRESS) instrument, which was delivered to the ISS on the same mission that offloaded HICO in 2018.
- Orbiting Carbon Observatory 3 (OCO-3), installed in 2019.

== Applications ==
- Phytoplankton ecology in general, such as which types of phytoplankton are present in a region of the ocean based on the signature of their pigments and the colors of light those pigments absorb.
- Detection of harmful algal blooms (HABs) by recognizing unique wavelengths of light being emitted by specific types of plankton blooming in large quantities. For example, HICO imagery has been used in the detection of cyanobacteria blooms in inland waters (such as Lake Erie and Pinto Lake, California and blooms of the ciliate Mesodinium rubrum in Long Island Sound.
- Mapping bathymetry of shallow waters.
- Dissolved matter photochemistry in coastal waters.
- Water quality monitoring, including variables such as chlorophyll-a and suspended particulate matter.
- Maps of terrain, vegetation type, and bottom type.
- Characterization of the Deepwater Horizon Oil Spill in April 2010, including collecting images from the area around the explosion sites and from nearby marshes to identify unpolluted water, oil-water mixtures, and emulsified oil strands.

== See also ==
- Earth observation satellite
- Hyperspectral imaging
- Imaging spectroscopy
- International Space Station
- Kibo (ISS module)
- Ocean color
- Plankton, Aerosol, Cloud, ocean Ecosystem
- Scientific research on the International Space Station
