= Gene Carl Feldman =

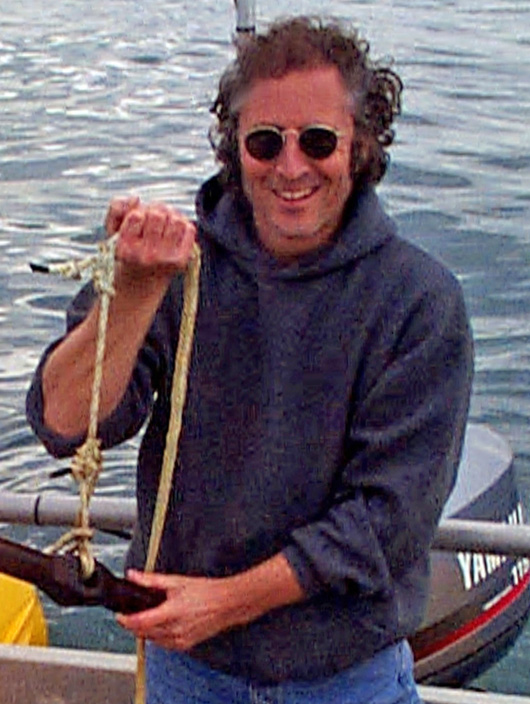
- Gene Carl Feldman
- Education: State University of New York at Stony Brook
- Known for: 40 years of active Ocean Color research
- Awards: James Smithson Bicentennial Medal, NASA Software of the Year Award], NASA Excellence in Information Science & Technology Award
- Scientific career
- Fields: Oceanography/remote sensing
- Workplaces: NASA Goddard Space Flight Center (GSFC)

Gene Carl Feldman has been an oceanographer at NASA Goddard Space Flight Center (GSFC) since 1985. His primary interest has been to try to make the data that NASA gathers from its spaceborne fleet of Earth observing instruments, especially those monitoring the subtle changes in ocean color, as scientifically credible, readily understandable and as easily available to the broadest group of people possible. He has been involved in a number of past and present NASA missions including the Coastal Zone Color Scanner (CZCS), the Sea-Viewing Wide Field Sensor (SeaWiFS) and the Moderate-Resolution Imaging Spectroradiometer (MODIS) and along with the NASA Ocean Biology Processing group which he co-leads, been given the responsibility for designing, implementing and operating the data processing and mission operations component of ocean salinity mission called Aquarius, a space mission developed by NASA and the Space Agency of Argentina - Comisión Nacional de Actividades Espaciales (CONAE) that was successfully launched in June 2011 and began routine operations on December 1, 2011 and completed its prime mission in June 2015.

Prior to his work with NASA, his experience included extended service (3½ years) as a Peace Corps Volunteer in Western Samoa, where among other things he was involved in fish farming, sea turtle conservation, boat building and village fisheries development and work with the NOAA's National Marine Fisheries Service as a fisheries biologist in Seattle, Alaska and San Diego. These experiences led to his becoming a Graduate Research Fellow at the Marine Sciences Research Center, State University of New York at Stony Brook, where for his dissertation, he used satellite and oceanographic data to study the variability in, and the relationship between, the physical and biological processes in the ocean. He earned his Ph.D. in Coastal Oceanography in 1985.

== Gallery ==
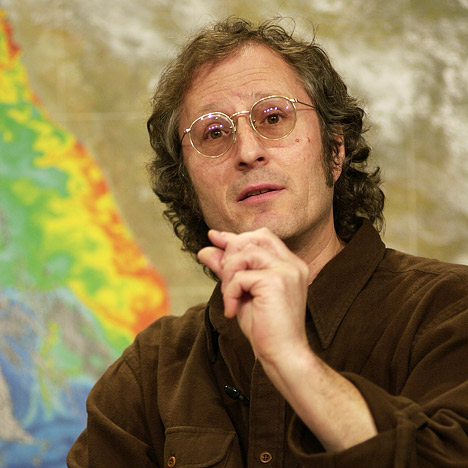
Gene Carl Feldman

Feldman reflects on his unique perspective on the Galapagos Islands

== Notes ==
- Ocean Color documents from various authors available from the "OceanColor Web"
