= SeaBASS (data archive) =

Data archive of in situ oceanographic data

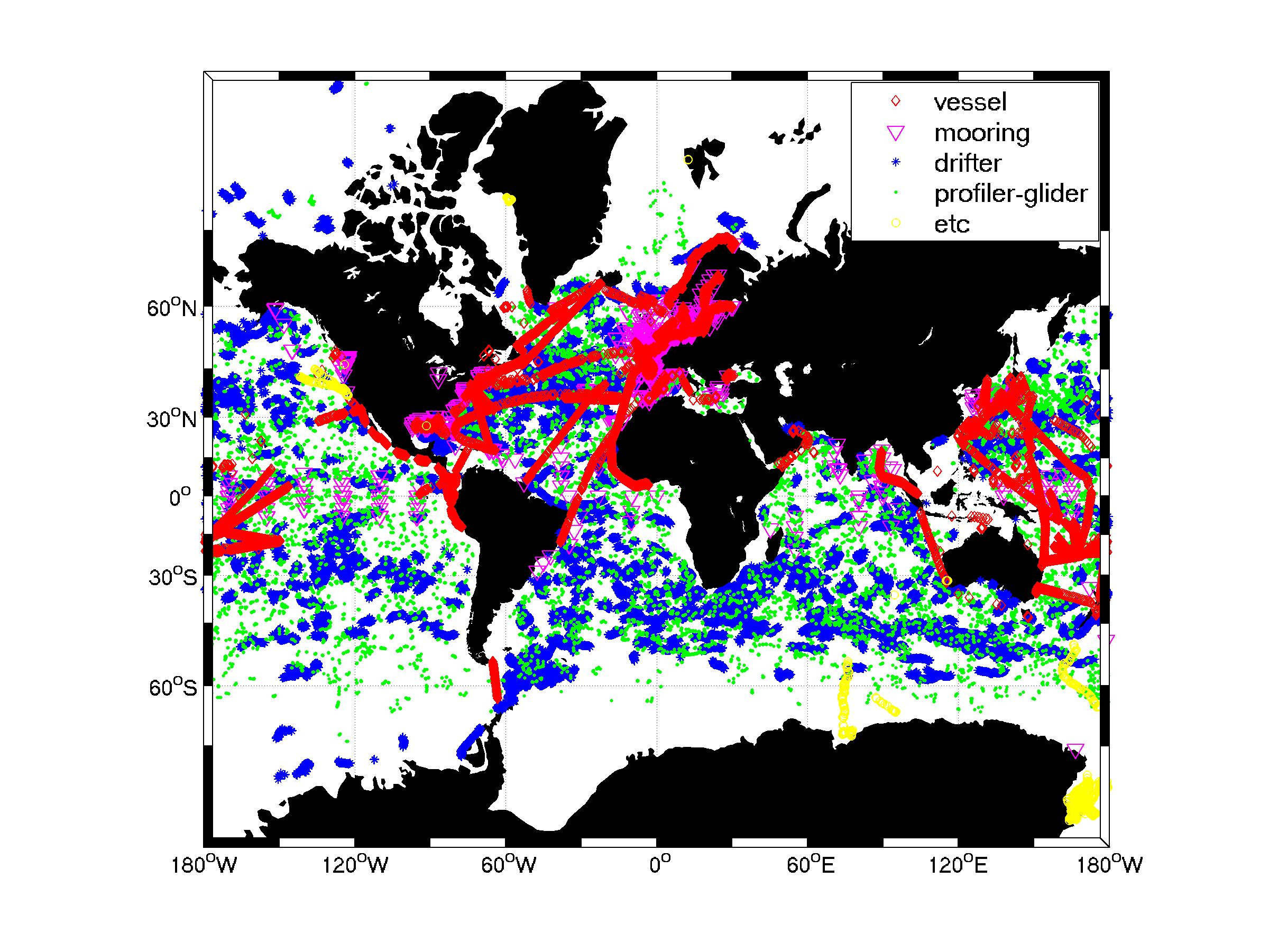
Data are archived in the SeaBASS repository from field campaigns throughout the world, similar to the distribution of the ocean data shown in this example map.

The SeaWiFS Bio-optical Archive and Storage System (SeaBASS) is a data archive of in situ oceanographic data used to support satellite remote sensing research of ocean color. SeaBASS is used for developing algorithms for satellite-derived variables (such as chlorophyll-a concentration) and for validating or “ground-truthing” satellite-derived data products. The acronym begins with “S” for SeaWiFS, because the data repository began in the 1990s around the time of the launch of the SeaWiFS satellite sensor, and the same data archive has been used ever since. Oceanography projects funded by the NASA Earth Science program are required to upload data collected on research campaigns to the SeaBASS data repository to increase the volume of open-access data available to the public. As of 2021 the data archive contained information from thousands of field campaigns uploaded by over 100 principal investigators.

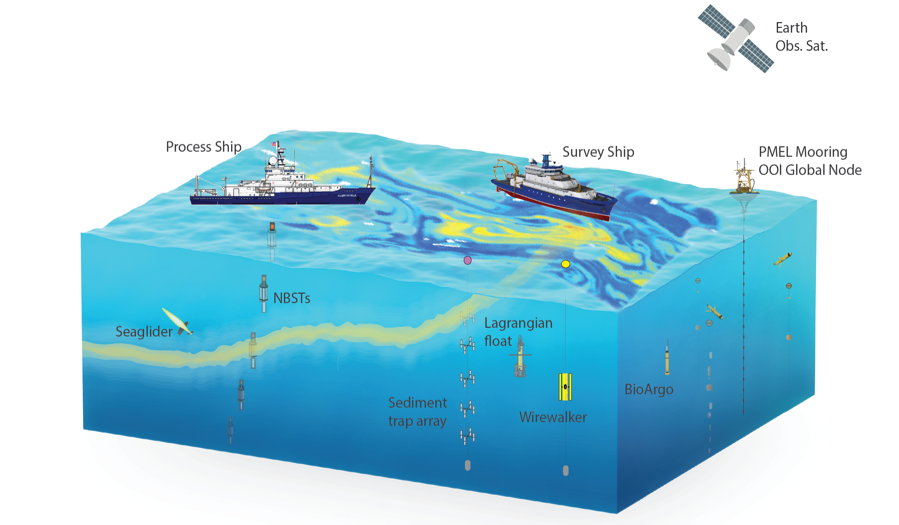
Schematic of the types of oceanography measurements that may be uploaded to the SeaBASS data repository.

Light absorption spectra of phytoplankton show the amount of light in different colors of the visible light spectrum absorbed by ocean phytoplankton. Spectral light absorption is one type of data stored in the SeaBASS data repository.

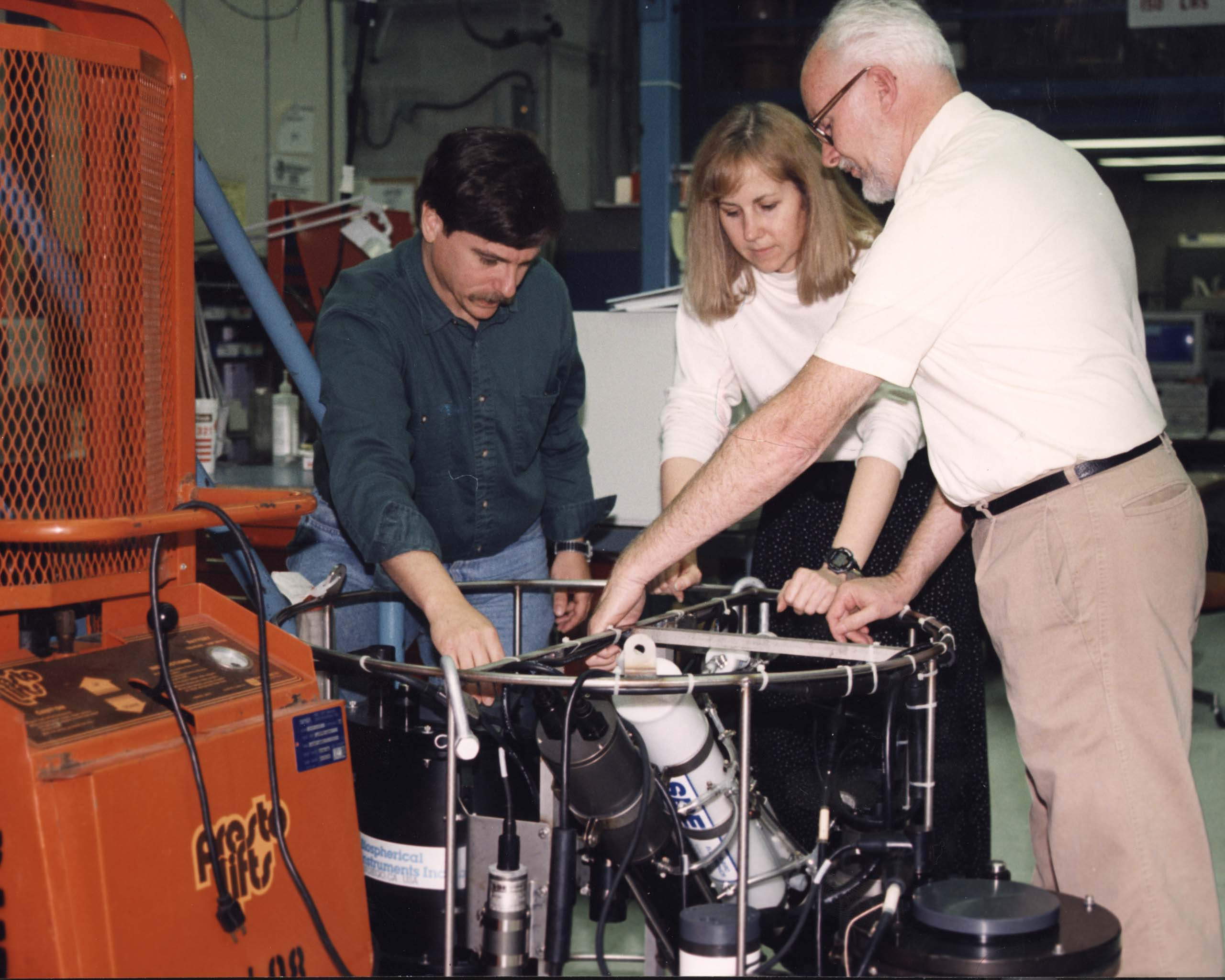
Researchers prepare instruments to deploy from a research vessel (in situ). Data collected using instruments like these ones get uploaded to SeaBASS to help scientists derive products (like chlorophyll-a concentration) from satellite data.

== See also ==
- EOSDIS
- Ocean color
- Ocean observations
- Ocean optics
- Water remote sensing
