= Ocean color =

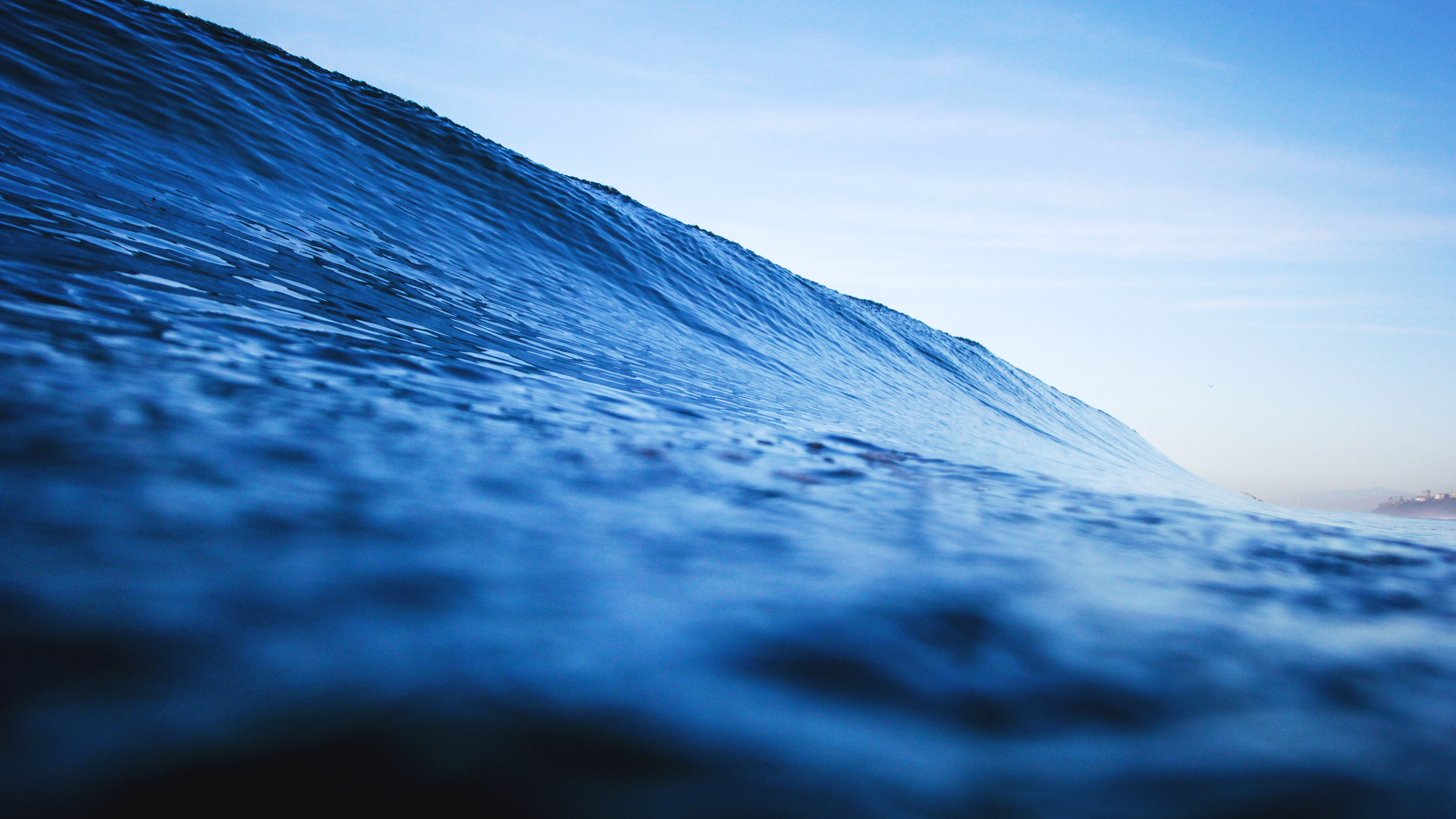
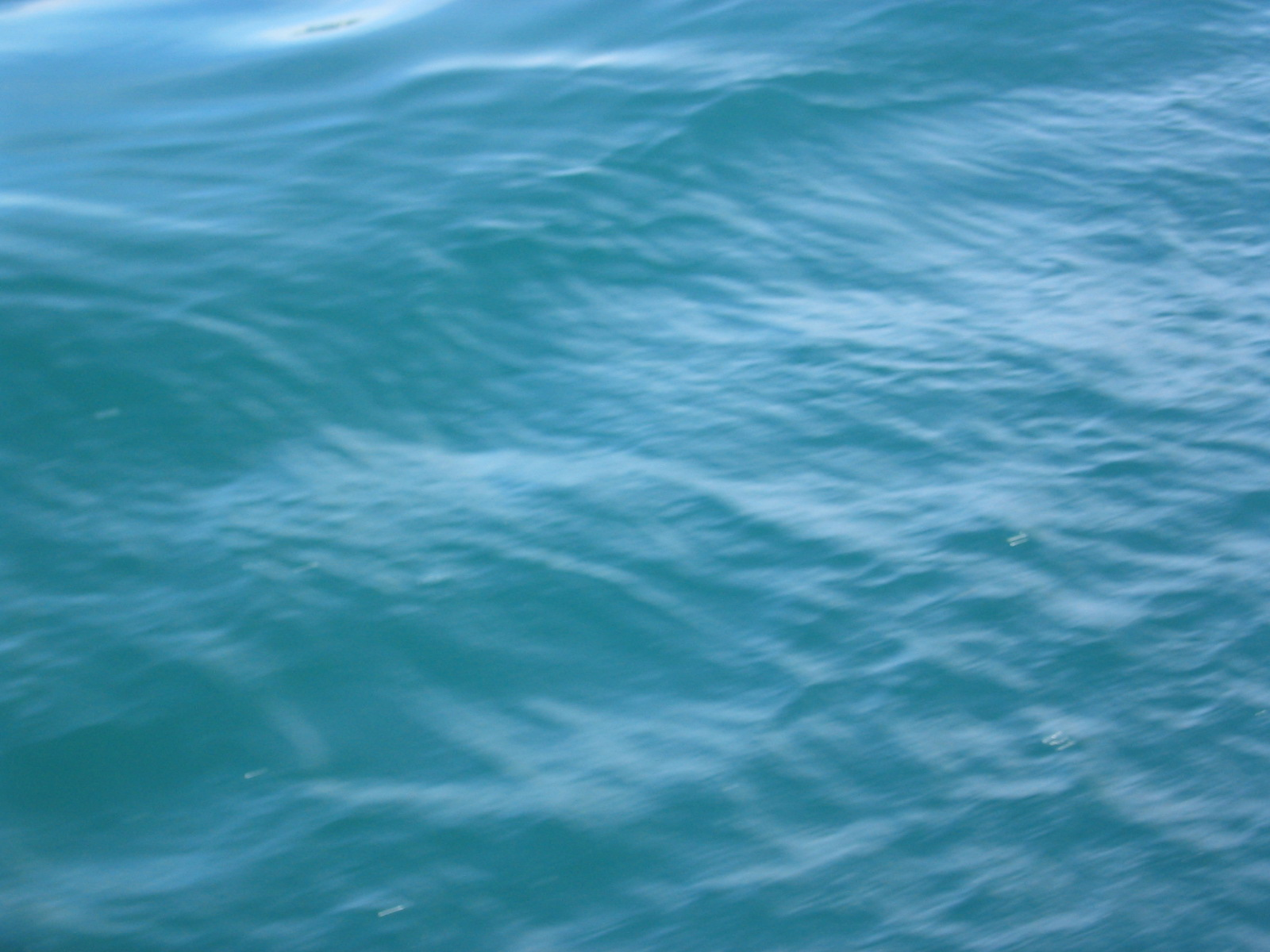
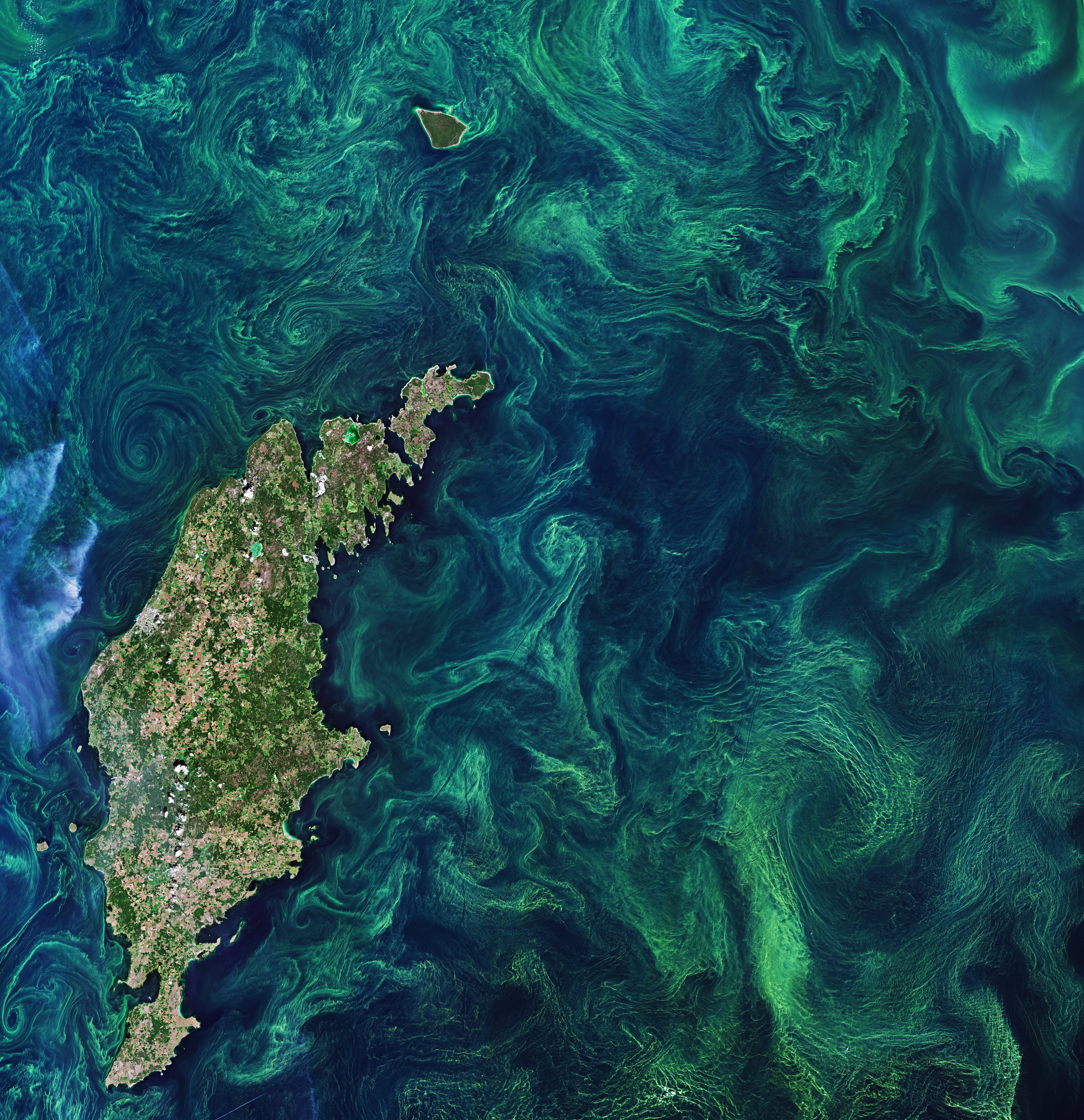
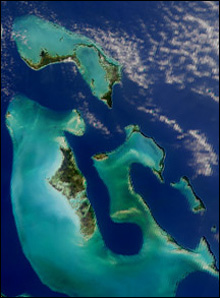
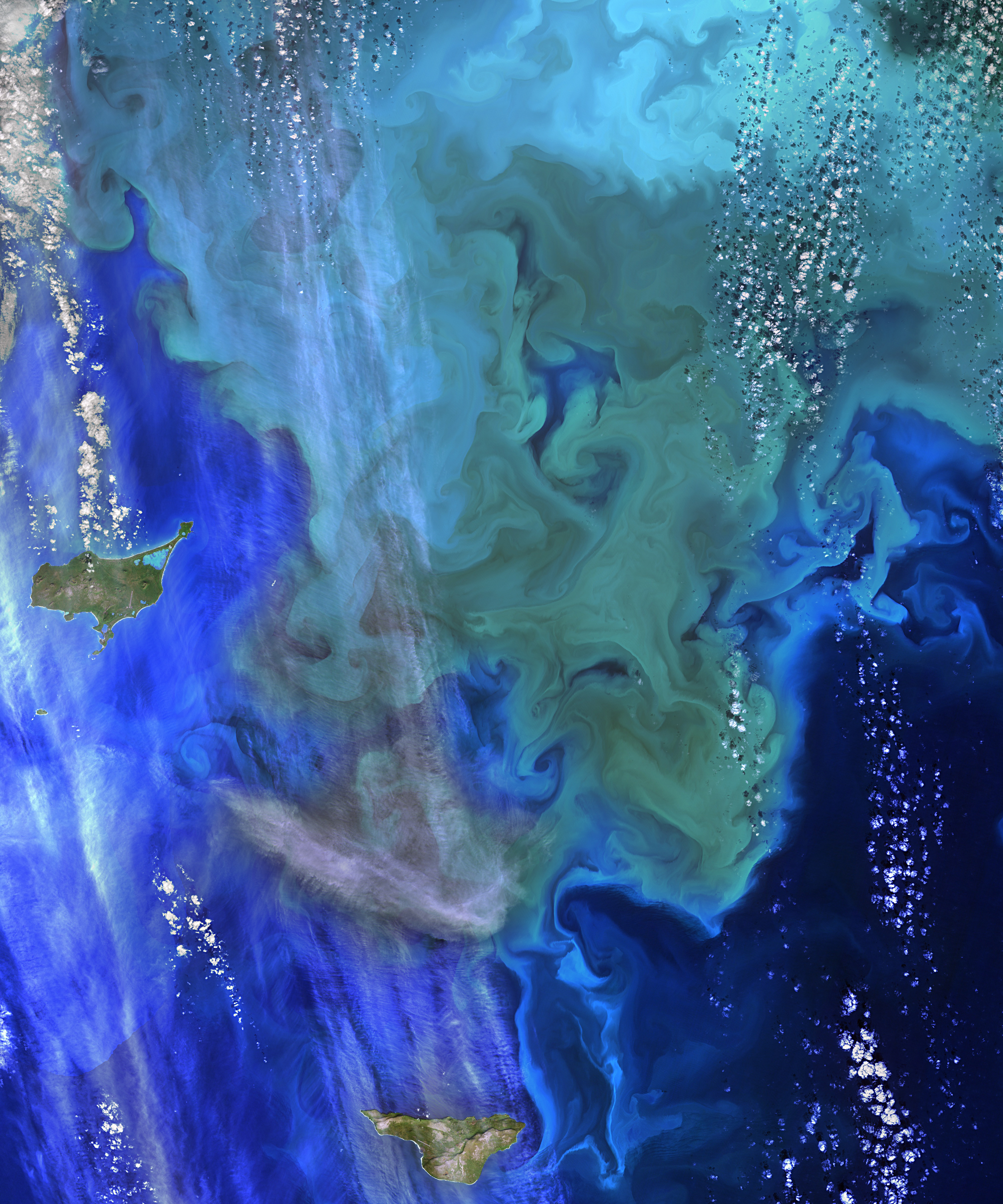
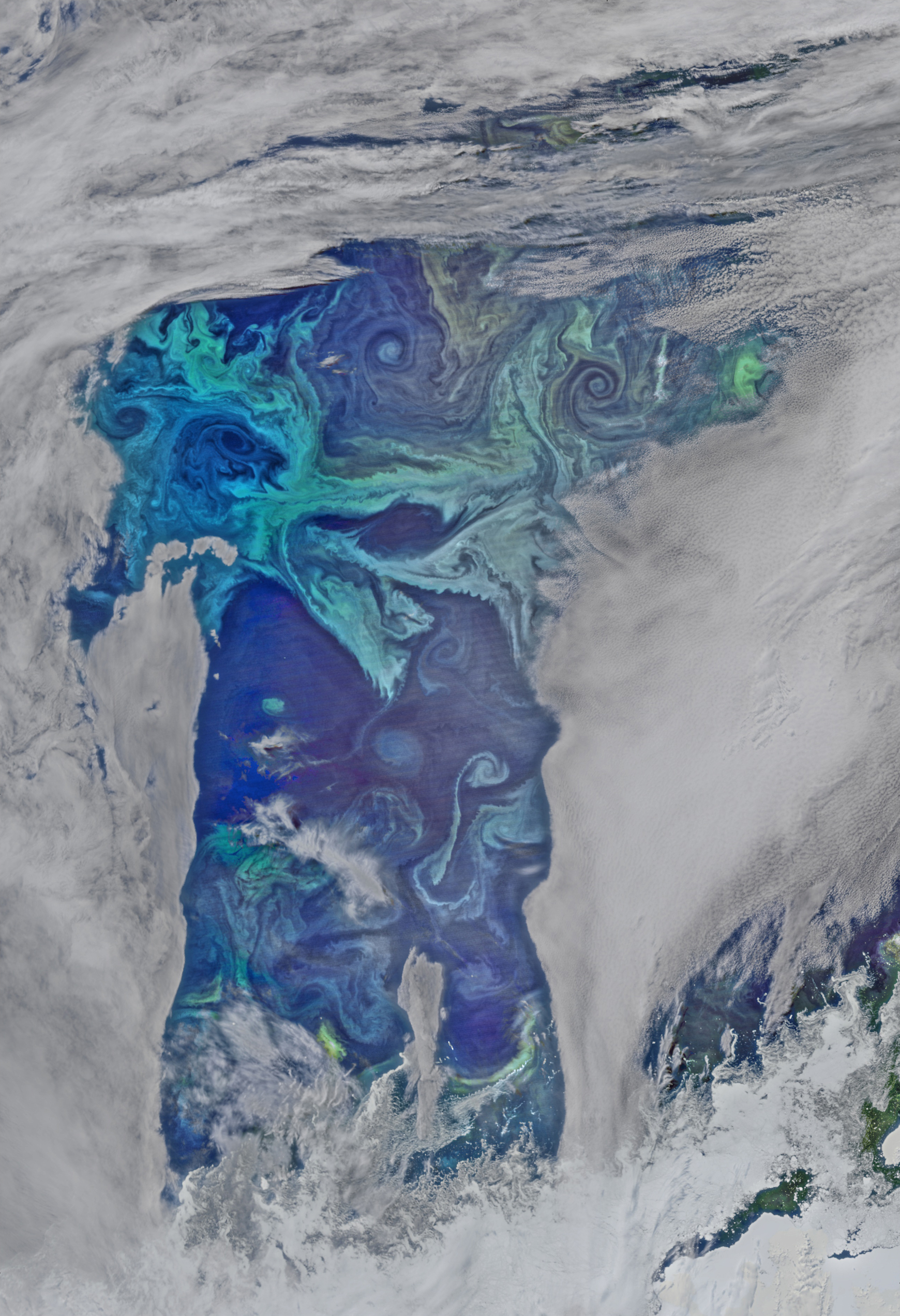
Clockwise from top left: deep blue water, blue-green water, satellite image of the Bahamas where sunlight reflects off sand and reefs in the shallows, satellite image of phytoplankton bloom in the Southern Ocean, satellite image of the Pribilof Islands showing shades of color from different phytoplankton, and satellite image of the Baltic Sea with phytoplankton blooms.

Ocean color is the branch of ocean optics that specifically studies the color of the water and information that can be gained from looking at variations in color. The color of the ocean, while mainly blue, actually varies from blue to green or even yellow, brown or red in some cases. This field of study developed alongside water remote sensing, so it is focused mainly on how color is measured by instruments (like the sensors on satellites and airplanes).

Most of the ocean is blue in color, but in some places the ocean is blue-green, green, or even yellow to brown. Blue ocean color is a result of several factors. First, water preferentially absorbs red light, which means that blue light remains and is reflected back out of the water. Red light is most easily absorbed and thus does not reach great depths, usually to less than 50 meters (164 ft). Blue light, in comparison, can penetrate up to 200 meters (656 ft). Second, water molecules and very tiny particles in ocean water preferentially scatter blue light more than light of other colors. Blue light scattering by water and tiny particles happens even in the very clearest ocean water, and is similar to blue light scattering in the sky.

The main substances that affect the color of the ocean include dissolved organic matter, living phytoplankton with chlorophyll pigments, and non-living particles like marine snow and mineral sediments. Chlorophyll can be measured by satellite observations and serves as a proxy for ocean productivity (marine primary productivity) in surface waters. In long term composite satellite images, regions with high ocean productivity show up in yellow and green colors because they contain more (green) phytoplankton, whereas areas of low productivity show up in blue.

== Overview ==
Ocean color depends on how light interacts with the materials in the water. When light enters water, it can either be absorbed (light gets used up, the water gets "darker"), scattered (light gets bounced around in different directions, the water remains "bright"), or a combination of both. How underwater absorption and scattering vary spectrally, or across the spectrum of visible to infrared light energy (about 400 nm to 2000 nm wavelengths) determines what "color" the water will appear to a sensor.

== Water types by color ==
Most of the world's oceans appear blue because the light leaving water is brightest (has the highest reflectance value) in the blue part of the visible light spectrum. Nearer to land, coastal waters often appear green. Green waters appear this way because algae and dissolved substances are absorbing light in the blue and red portions of the spectrum.

=== Blue oceans ===
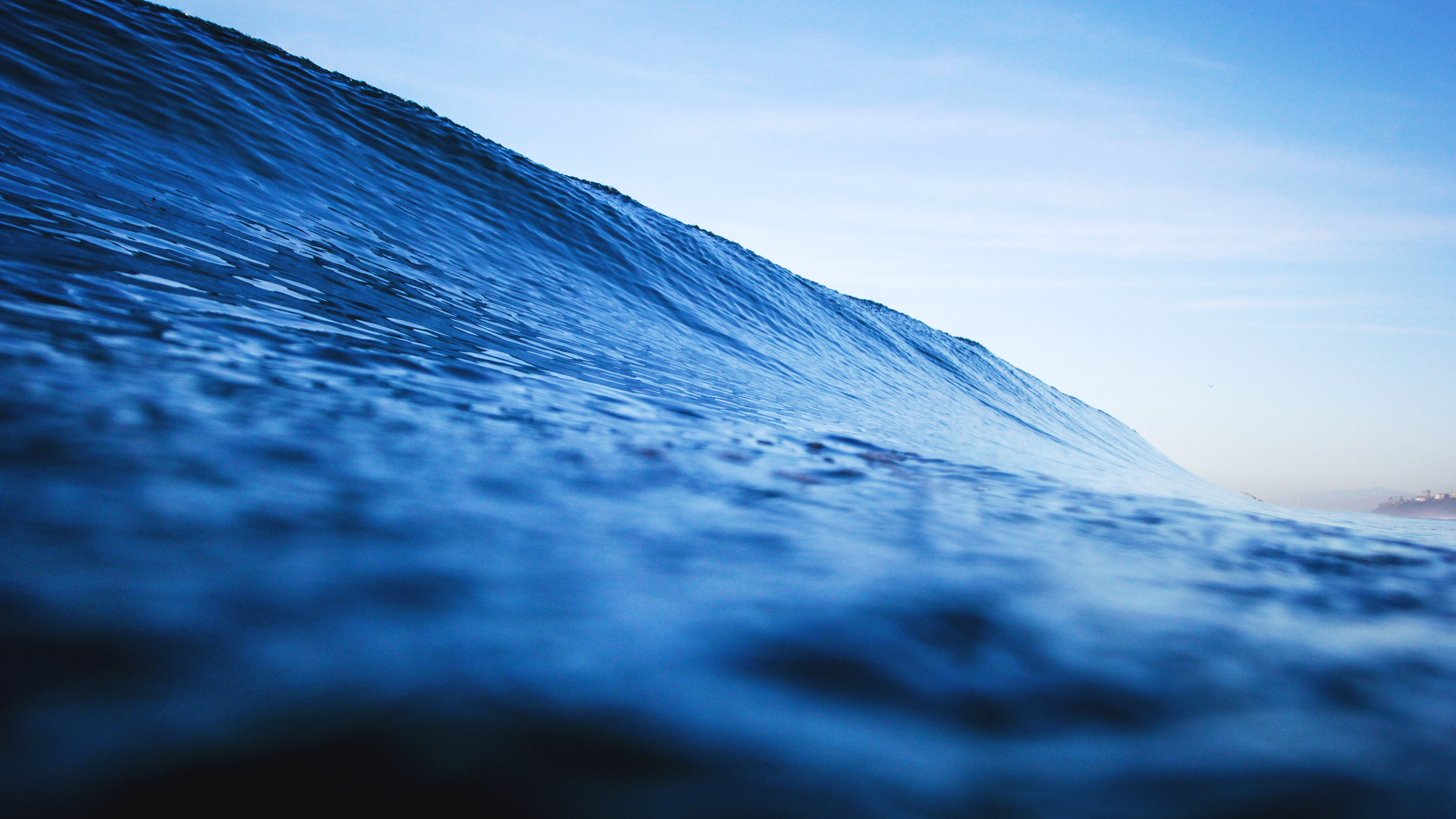
A deep blue colored wave viewed from the water surface near Encinitas, California, United States. The Pacific Ocean contains some of the most deep blue colored waters in the world.

The reason that open-ocean waters appear blue is that they are very clear, somewhat similar to pure water, and have few materials present or very tiny particles only. Pure water absorbs red light with depth. As red light is absorbed, blue light remains. Large quantities of pure water appear blue (even in a white-bottom swimming pool or white-painted bucket). The substances that are present in blue-colored open ocean waters are often very tiny particles which scatter light, scattering light especially strongly in the blue wavelengths. Light scattering in blue water is similar to the scattering in the atmosphere which makes the sky appear blue (called Rayleigh scattering). Some blue-colored clear water lakes appear blue for these same reasons, like Lake Tahoe in the United States.

=== Green oceans ===
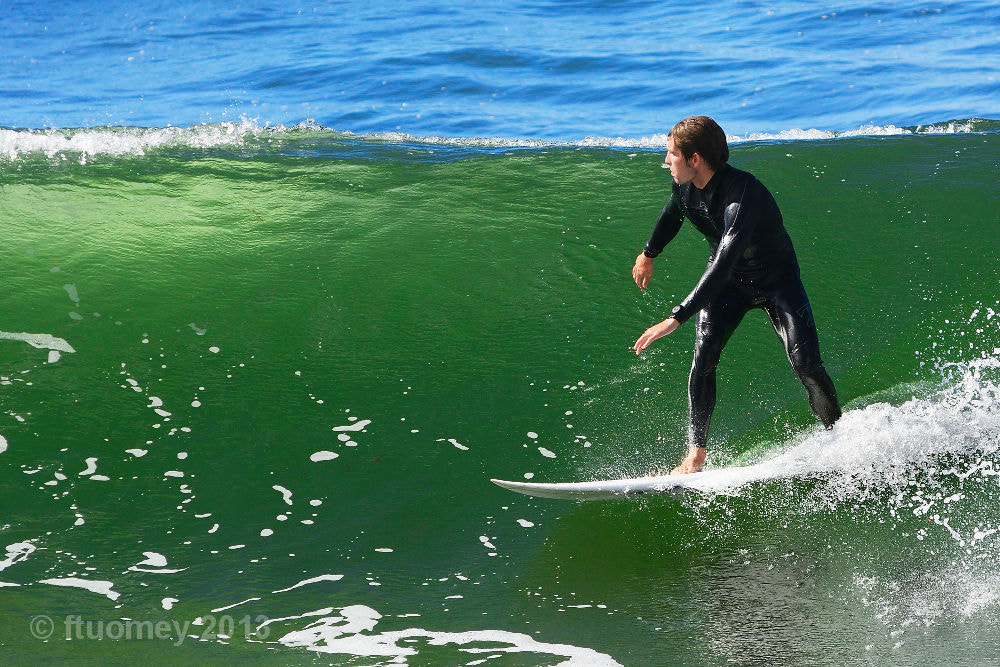
A surfer cuts through a green colored wave of ocean water at Strandhill, Ireland.

Microscopic marine algae, called phytoplankton, absorb light in the blue and red wavelengths, due to their specific pigments like chlorophyll-a. Accordingly, with more and more phytoplankton in the water, the color of the water shifts toward the green part of the spectrum.

The most widespread light-absorbing substance in the oceans is chlorophyll pigment, which phytoplankton use to produce carbon by photosynthesis. Chlorophyll, a green pigment, makes phytoplankton preferentially absorb the red and blue portions of the light spectrum. As blue and red light are absorbed, green light remains. Ocean regions with high concentrations of phytoplankton have shades of blue-to-green water depending on the amount and type of the phytoplankton.

Green waters can also have a combination of phytoplankton, dissolved substances, and sediments, while still appearing green. This often happens in estuaries, coastal waters, and inland waters, which are called "optically complex" waters because multiple different substances are creating the green color seen by the sensor.

=== Yellow to brown oceans ===
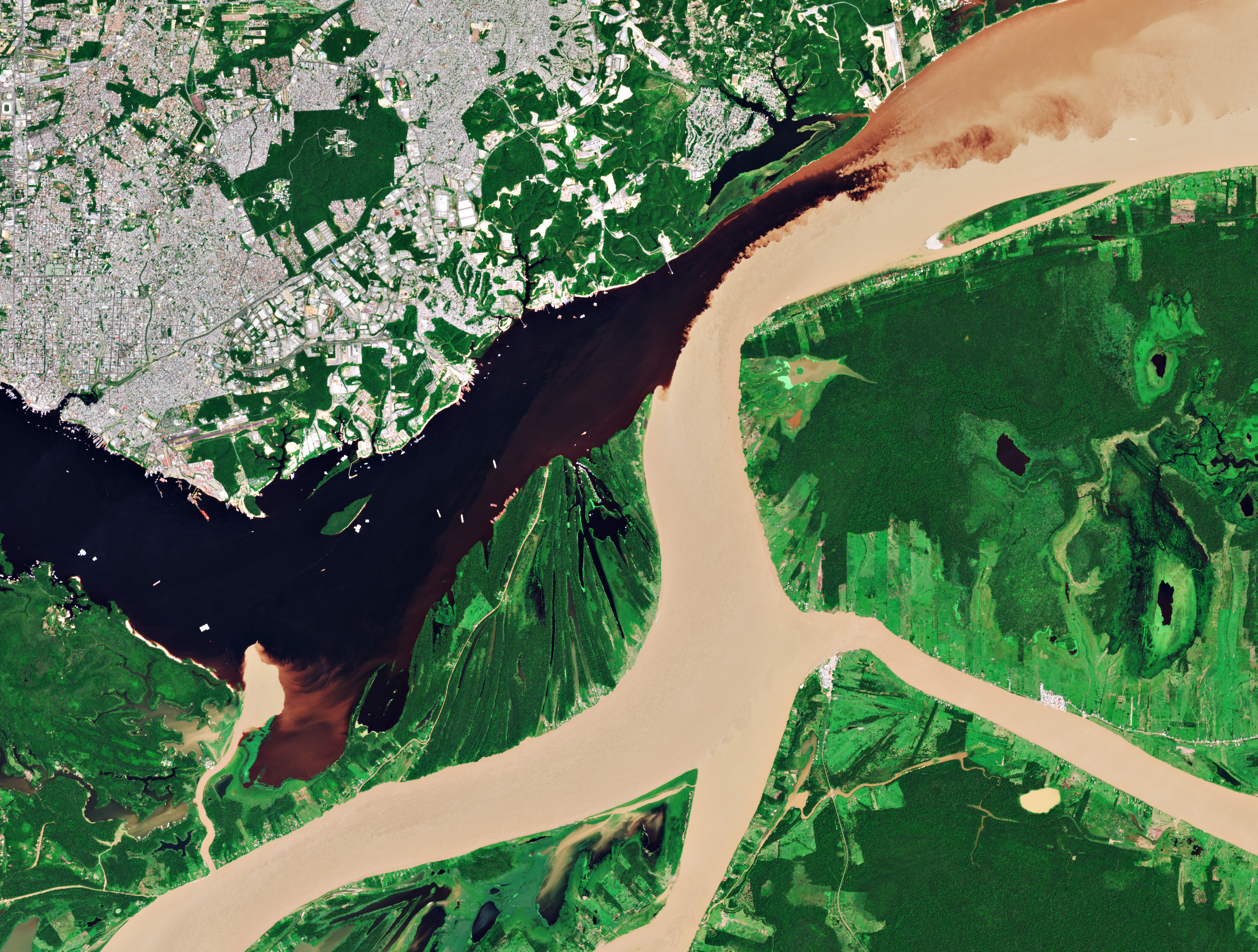
Sentinel-2 satellite image of the confluence of the Rio Negro and the Solimões River, Brazil. The Rio Negro in the upper left part of the image is dark due to high concentrations of colored dissolved organic matter (CDOM). The Solimões River in the lower and right part of the image is brighter because of large amounts of sediments.

Ocean water appears yellow or brown when large amounts of dissolved substances, sediments, or both types of material are present.

Water can appear yellow or brown due to large amounts of dissolved substances. Dissolved matter or gelbstoff (meaning yellow substance) appears dark yet relatively transparent, much like tea. Dissolved substances absorb blue light more strongly than light of other colors. Colored dissolved organic matter (CDOM) often comes from decaying plant matter on land or in marshes, or in the open ocean from marine phytoplankton exuding dissolved substances from their cells.

In coastal areas, runoff from rivers and resuspension of sand and silt from the bottom add sediments to surface waters. More sediments can make the waters appear more green, yellow, or brown because sediment particles scatter light energy at all colors. In large amounts, mineral particles like sediment cause the water to turn brownish if there is a massive sediment loading event, appearing bright and opaque (not transparent), much like chocolate milk.

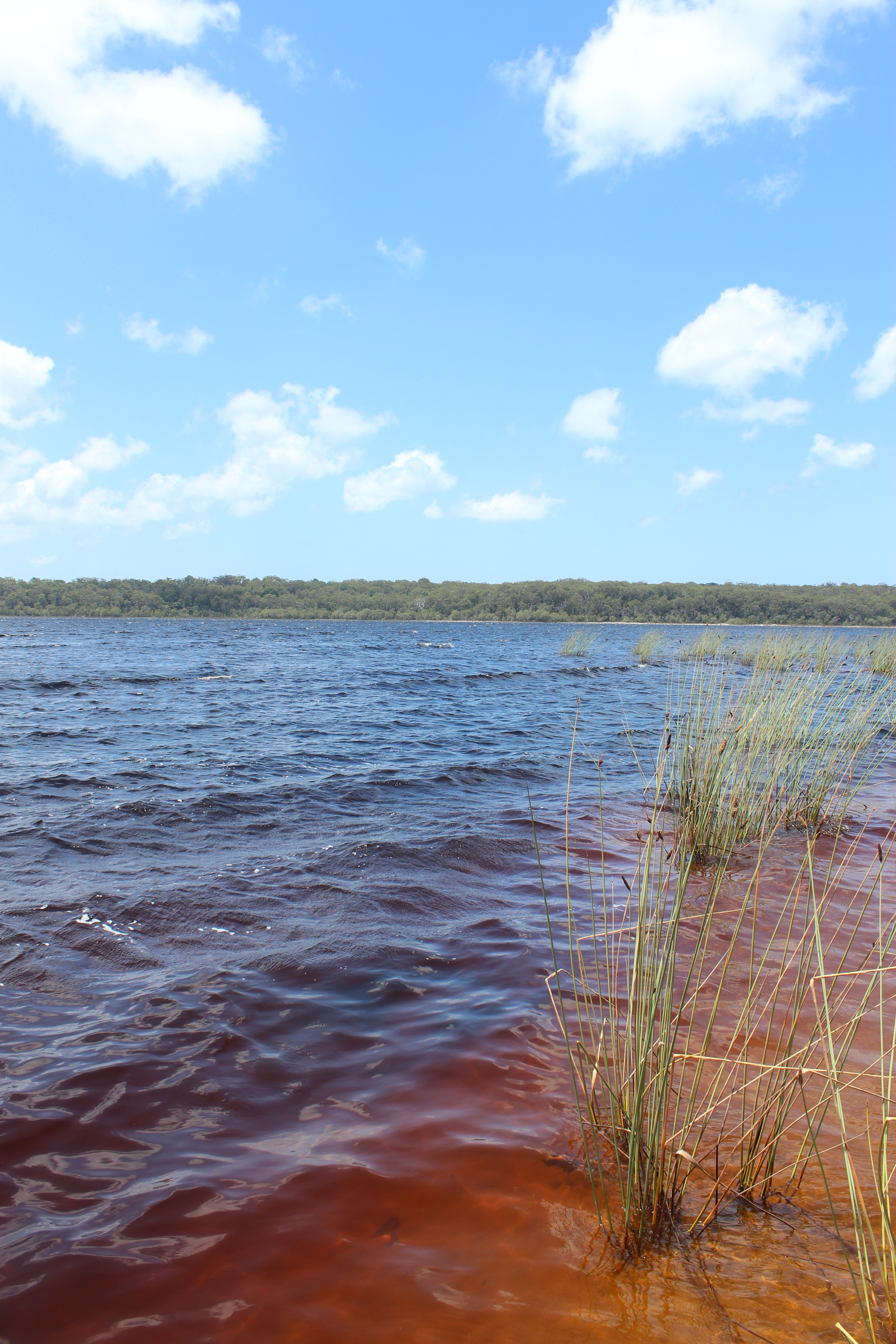
In Lake Boomanjin, Australia, the waters are strongly colored due to tannins from nearby trees.

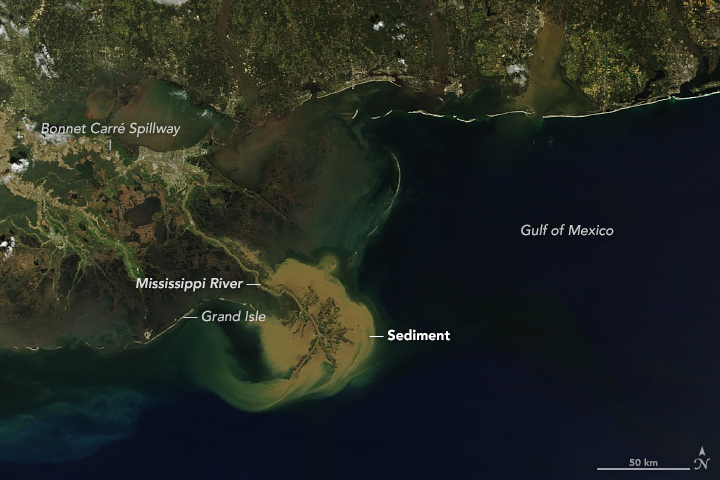
MODIS satellite image of the Mississippi River sediment plume in the Gulf of Mexico following a series of rainstorms in February 2018 (image from March 4, 2018).

=== Red oceans ===
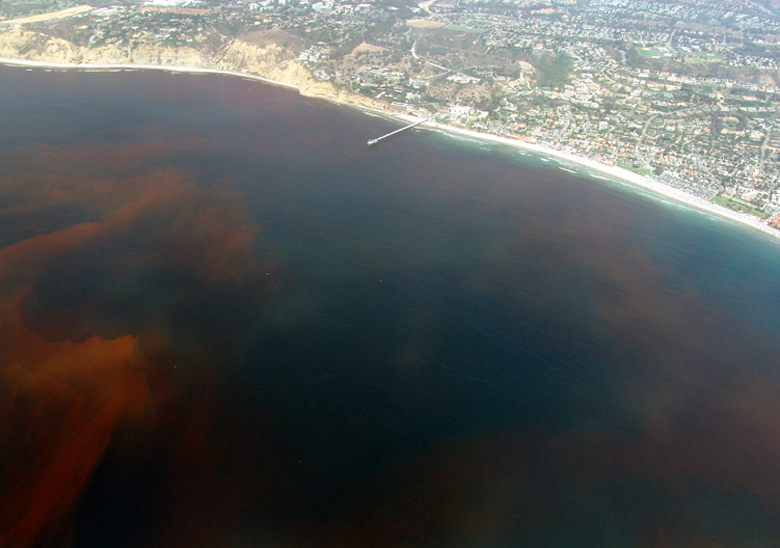
Red tide off Scripps Institution of Oceanography Pier, La Jolla, California, United States.

Ocean water can appear red if there is a bloom of a specific kind of phytoplankton causing a discoloration of the sea surface. These events are called "Red tides." However, not all red tides are harmful, and they are only considered harmful algal blooms if the type of plankton involved contains hazardous toxins. The red color comes from the pigments in the specific kinds of phytoplankton causing the bloom. Some examples are Karenia brevis in the Gulf of Mexico, Alexandrium fundyense in the Gulf of Maine, Margalefadinium polykroides and Alexandrium monilatum in the Chesapeake Bay, and Mesodinium rubrum in Long Island Sound.

== Ocean color remote sensing ==
Ocean color remote sensing is also referred to as ocean color radiometry. Remote sensors on satellites, airplanes, and drones measure the spectrum of light energy coming from the water surface. The sensors used to measure light energy coming from the water are called radiometers (or spectrometers or spectroradiometers). Some radiometers are used in the field at earth's surface on ships or directly in the water. Other radiometers are designed specifically for airplanes or earth-orbiting satellite missions. Using radiometers, scientists measure the amount of light energy coming from the water at all colors of the electromagnetic spectrum from ultraviolet to near-infrared. From this reflected spectrum of light energy, or the apparent "color," researchers derive other variables to understand the physics and biology of the oceans.

Ocean color measurements can be used to infer important information such as phytoplankton biomass or concentrations of other living and non-living material. The patterns of algal blooms from satellite over time, over large regions up to the scale of the global ocean, has been instrumental in characterizing variability of marine ecosystems. Ocean color data is a key tool for research into how marine ecosystems respond to climate change and anthropogenic perturbations.

One of the biggest challenges for ocean color remote sensing is atmospheric correction, or removing the color signal of the atmospheric haze and clouds to focus on the color signal of the ocean water. The signal from the water itself is less than 10% of the total signal of light leaving Earth's surface.

=== History ===
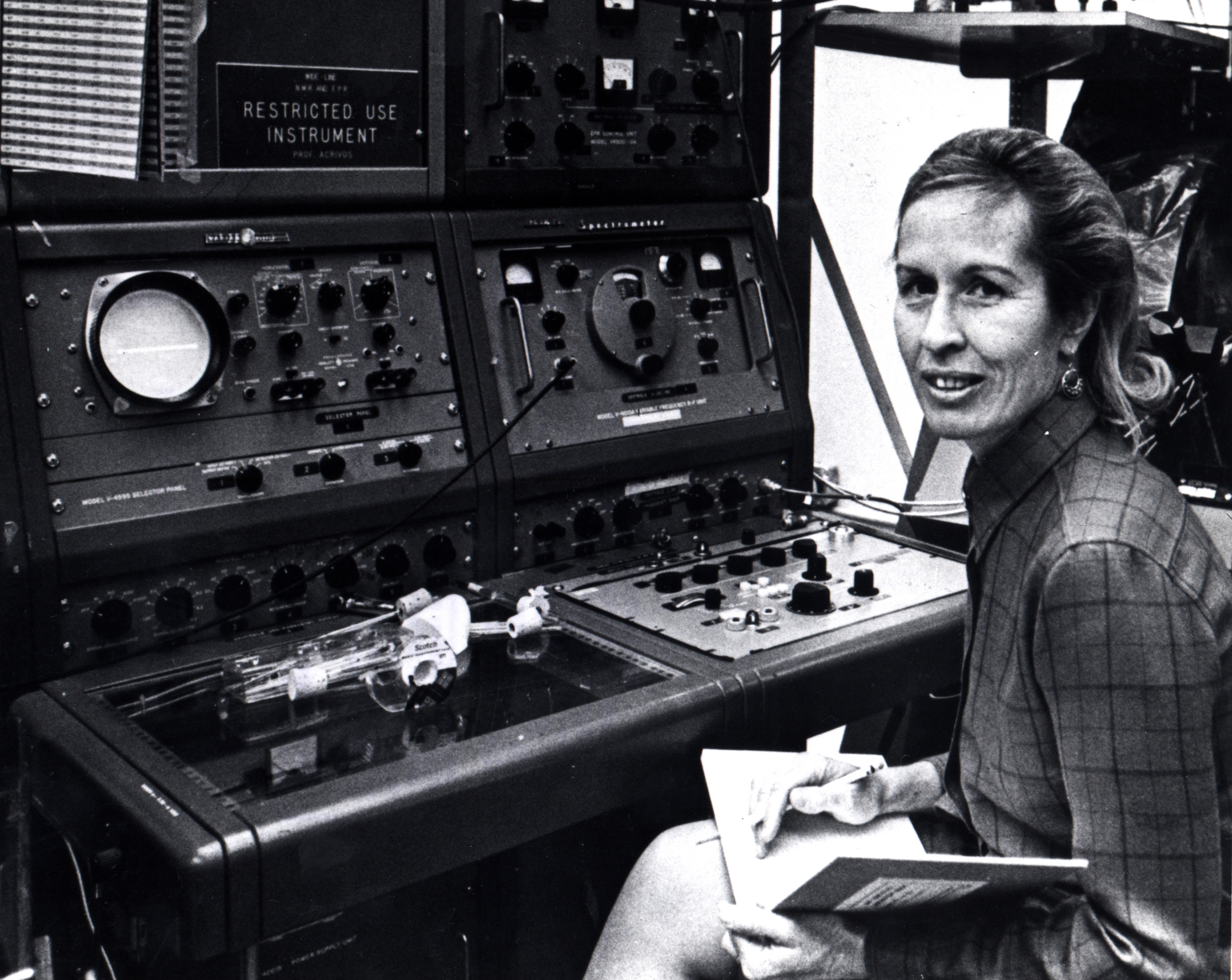
Scientists including biologist Ellen Weaver helped to develop the first sensors to measure ocean productivity from above, beginning with airplane-mounted sensors.

People have written about the color of the ocean over many centuries, including ancient Greek poet Homer's famous "wine-dark sea." Scientific measurements of the color of the ocean date back to the invention of the Secchi disk in Italy in the mid-1800s to study the transparency and clarity of the sea.

Major accomplishments were made in the 1960s and 1970s leading up to modern ocean color remote sensing campaigns. Nils Gunnar Jerlov's book Optical Oceanography, published in 1968, was a starting point for many researchers in the next decades. In 1970, George Clarke published the first evidence that chlorophyll concentration could be estimated based on green versus blue light coming from the water, as measured from an airplane over George's Bank. In the 1970s, scientist Howard Gordon and his graduate student George Maul related imagery from the first Landsat mission to ocean color. Around the same time, a group of researchers, including John Arvesen, Dr. Ellen Weaver, and explorer Jacques Cousteau, began developing sensors to measure ocean productivity beginning with an airborne sensor.

Remote sensing of ocean color from space began in 1978 with the successful launch of NASA's Coastal Zone Color Scanner (CZCS) on the Nimbus-7 satellite. Despite the fact that CZCS was an experimental mission intended to last only one year as a proof of concept, the sensor continued to generate valuable time-series data over selected test sites until early 1986. Ten years passed before other sources of ocean color data became available with the launch of other sensors, and in particular the Sea-viewing Wide Field-of-view sensor (SeaWiFS) in 1997 on board the NASA SeaStar satellite. Subsequent sensors have included NASA's Moderate-resolution Imaging Spectroradiometer (MODIS) on board the Aqua and Terra satellites, ESA's MEdium Resolution Imaging Spectrometer (MERIS) onboard its environmental satellite Envisat. Several new ocean-colour sensors have recently been launched, including the Indian Ocean Colour Monitor (OCM-2) on-board ISRO's Oceansat-2 satellite and the Korean Geostationary Ocean Color Imager (GOCI), which is the first ocean colour sensor to be launched on a geostationary satellite, and Visible Infrared Imager Radiometer Suite (VIIRS) aboard NASA's Suomi NPP. More ocean colour sensors are planned over the next decade by various space agencies, including hyperspectral imaging.

=== Applications ===
Ocean Color Radiometry and its derived products are also seen as fundamental Essential Climate Variables as defined by the Global Climate Observing System. Ocean color datasets provide the only global synoptic perspective of primary production in the oceans, giving insight into the role of the world's oceans in the global carbon cycle. Ocean color data helps researchers map information relevant to society, such as water quality, hazards to human health like harmful algal blooms, bathymetry, and primary production and habitat types affecting commercially-important fisheries.

==== Chlorophyll as a proxy for phytoplankton ====
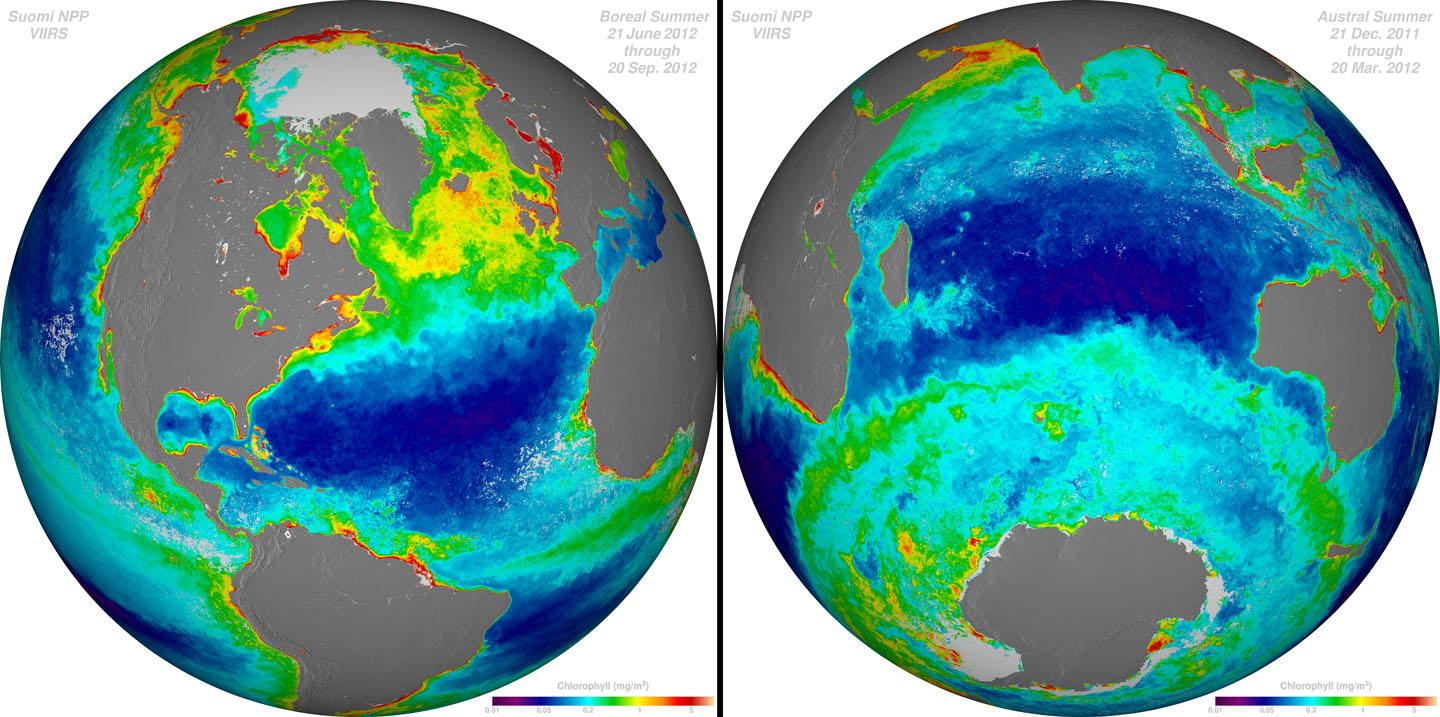
Season-long composites of ocean chlorophyll concentrations. The purple and blue colors represent lower chlorophyll concentrations. The oranges and reds represent higher chlorophyll concentrations. These differences indicate areas with lesser or greater phytoplankton biomass.

Satellite-derived chlorophyll-a concentration (mg m^{−3}) from July 2002 to March 2017. This visualization was derived using data from the Moderate Resolution Imaging Spectroradiometer (MODIS) onboard NASA's Aqua satellite. Chlorophyll-a concentration is a proxy for phytoplankton abundance. Darker shades of green indicate more chlorophyll and more phytoplankton, while shades of blue indicate less chlorophyll and less phytoplankton.

The most widely used piece of information from ocean color remote sensing is satellite-derived chlorophyll-a concentration. Researchers calculate satellite-derived chlorophyll-a concentration from space based on the central premise that the more phytoplankton is in the water, the greener it is.

Phytoplankton are microscopic algae, marine primary producers that turn sunlight into chemical energy that supports the ocean food web. Like plants on land, phytoplankton create oxygen for other life on Earth. Ocean color remote sensing ever since the launch of SeaWiFS in 1997 has allowed scientists to map phytoplankton – and thus model primary production - throughout the world's oceans over many decades, marking a major advance in knowledge of the Earth system.

==== Other applications ====
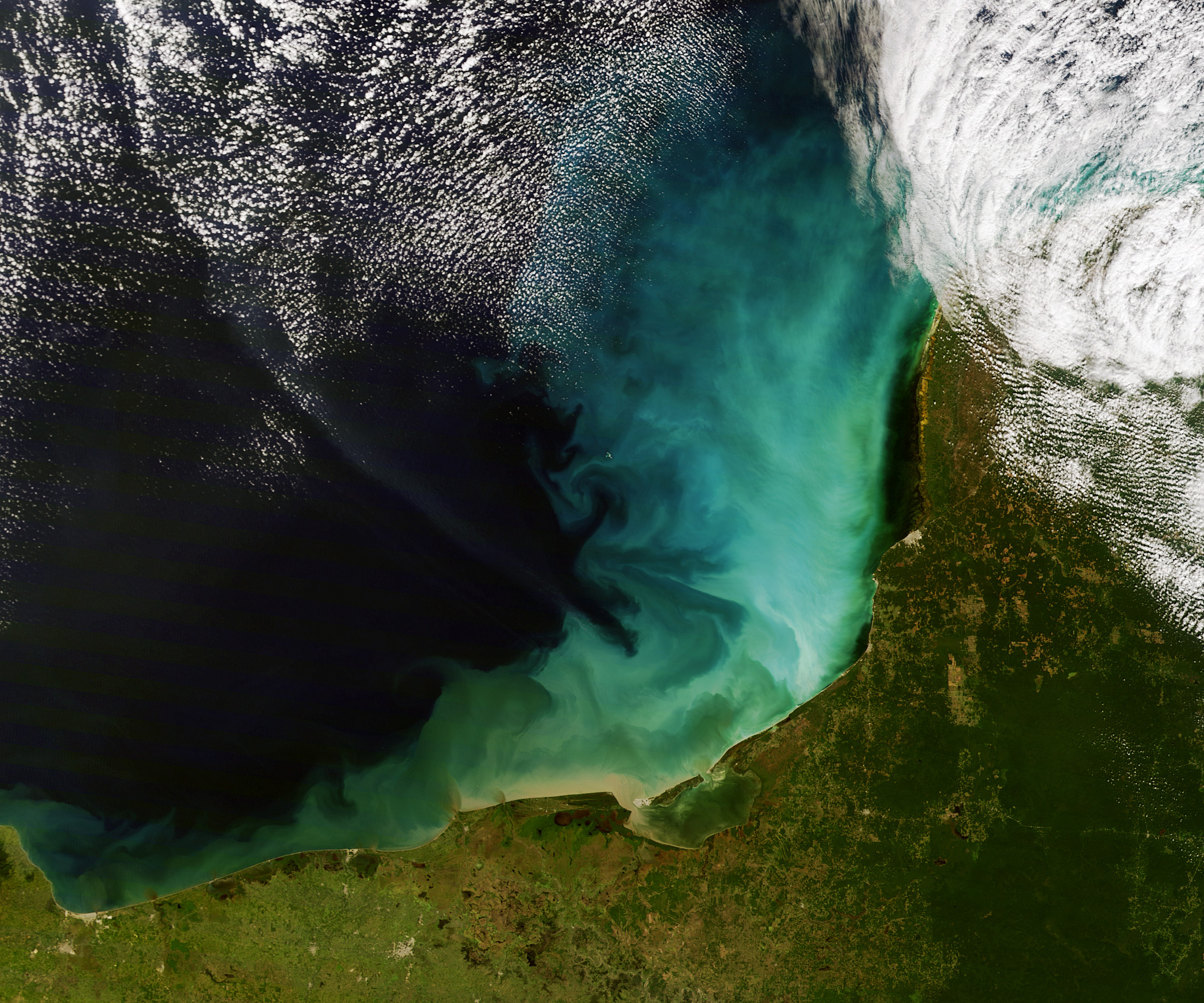
Suspended sediments can be seen in satellite imagery following events when high winds cause waves to stir up the seafloor, like in this image of the western side of the Yucatan Peninsula. Darker brown colored water shows where sediments come from land via rivers, while lighter colored water shows where sediments come from the chalky calcium carbonate sands on the seafloor.

Beyond chlorophyll, a few examples of some of the ways that ocean color data are used include:

Harmful algal blooms

Researchers use ocean color data in conjunction with meteorological data and field sampling to forecast the development and movement of harmful algal blooms (commonly referred to as "red tides," although the two terms are not exactly the same). For example, MODIS data has been used to map Karenia brevis blooms in the Gulf of Mexico.

Suspended sediments

Researchers use ocean color data to map the extent of river plumes and document wind-driven resuspension of sediments from the seafloor. For example, after hurricanes Katrina and Rita in the Gulf of Mexico, ocean color remote sensing was used to map the effects offshore.

== Sensors ==
Sensors used to measure ocean color are instruments that measure light at multiple wavelengths (multispectral) or a continuous spectrum of colors (hyperspectral), usually spectroradiometers or optical radiometers. Ocean color sensors can either be mounted on satellites or airplanes, or used at Earth's surface.

=== Satellite sensors ===
The sensors below are earth-orbiting satellite sensors. The same sensor can be mounted on multiple satellites to give more coverage over time (aka higher temporal resolution). For example, the MODIS sensor is mounted on both Aqua and Terra satellites. Additionally, the VIIRS sensor is mounted on both Suomi National Polar-Orbiting Partnership (Suomi-NPP or SNPP) and Joint Polar Satellite System (JPSS-1, now known as NOAA-20) satellites.

- Coastal Zone Color Scanner (CZCS)
- Sea-viewing Wide Field-of-view Sensor (SeaWiFS) on OrbView-2 (aka SeaStar)
- Moderate-resolution Imaging Spectroradiometer (MODIS) on Aqua and Terra satellites
- Medium Resolution Imaging Spectrometer (MERIS)
- Polarization and Directionality of the Earth's Reflectances (POLDER)
- Geostationary Ocean Color Imager(GOCI) on the Communication, Ocean, and Meteorological (COMS) satellite
- Ocean Color Monitor (OCM) on Oceansat-2
- Ocean Color and Temperature Scanner (OCTS) on the Advanced Earth Observing Satellite (ADEOS)
- Multi Spectral Instrument (MSI) on Sentinel-2A and Sentinel-2B
- Ocean and Land Colour Instrument (OLCI) on Sentinel-3A and Sentinel-3B
- Visible Infrared Imaging Radiometer Suite (VIIRS) on Suomi-NPP (SNPP) and NOAA-20 (JPSS1) satellites
- Operational Land Imager (OLI) on Landsat-8
- Hyperspectral Imager for the Coastal Ocean (HICO) on the International Space Station
- Precursore IperSpettrale della Missione Applicative (PRISMA)
- Hawkeye on the SeaHawk Cubesat
- Ocean color instrument (OCI) and 2 polarimeters on the planned Plankton, Aerosol, Cloud, ocean Ecosystem satellite

=== Airborne sensors ===
The following sensors were designed to measure ocean color from airplanes for airborne remote sensing:

- Airborne Visible/Infrared Imaging Spectrometer (AVIRIS)
- Airborne Ocean Color Imager (AOCI)
- Portable Remote Imaging Spectrometer (PRISM) flown for the CORALS project on the Tempus Applied Solutions Gulfstream-IV (G-IV) aircraft
- Headwall Hyperspectral Imaging System (HIS)
- Coastal Airborne In situ Radiometers (C-AIR) bio-optical radiometer package
- Compact Airborne Spectrographic Imager (CASI)

=== In situ sensors ===
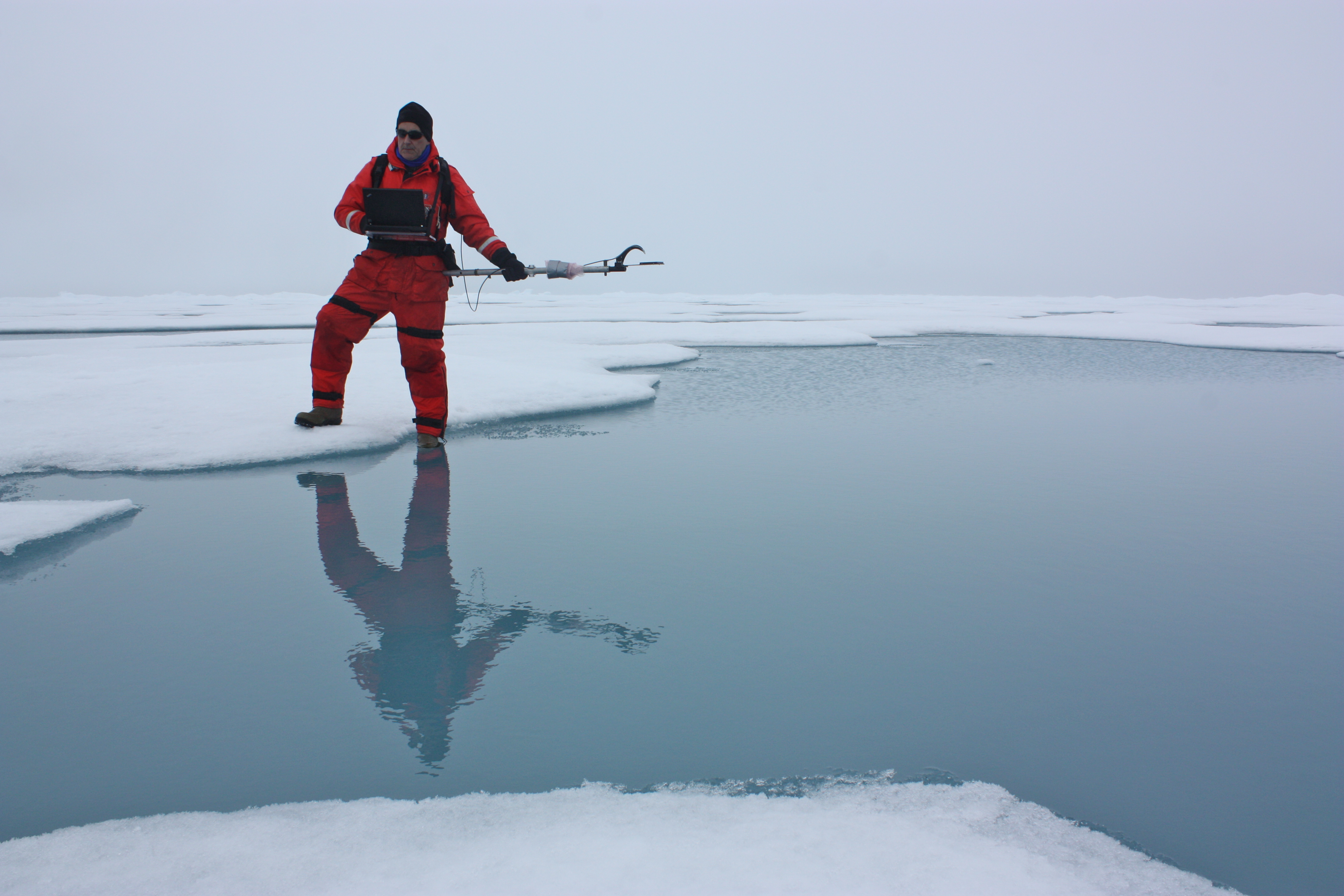
A researcher uses a spectroradiometer to measure the light energy radiating from an ice melt pond in the Chukchi Sea in summer 2011.

At Earth's surface, such as on research vessels, in the water using buoys, or on piers and towers, ocean color sensors take measurements that are then used to calibrate and validate satellite sensor data. Calibration and validation are two types of "ground-truthing" that are done independently. Calibration is the tuning of raw data from the sensor to match known values, such as the brightness of the moon or a known reflection value at Earth's surface. Calibration, done throughout the lifetime of any sensor, is especially critical to the early part of any satellite mission when the sensor is developed, launched, and beginning its first raw data collection. Validation is the independent comparison of measurements made in situ with measurements made from a satellite or airborne sensor. Satellite calibration and validation maintain the quality of ocean color satellite data. There are many kinds of in situ sensors, and the different types are often compared on dedicated field campaigns or lab experiments called "round robins." In situ data are archived in data libraries such as the SeaBASS data archive. Some examples of in situ sensors (or networks of many sensors) used to calibrate or validate satellite data are:

- Marine Optical Buoy (MOBY)
- Aerosol Robotic Network (AERONET)
- PANTHYR instrument
- Trios-RAMSES
- Compact Optical Profiling System (C-OPS)
- HyperSAS and HyperPro instruments

== See also ==
- Color of water
- Ocean optics
- Oceanography
- Remote sensing
- Satellite imagery
- Water clarity
- Water remote sensing
