= Coastal zone color scanner =

Satellite device designed for detecting water on Earth

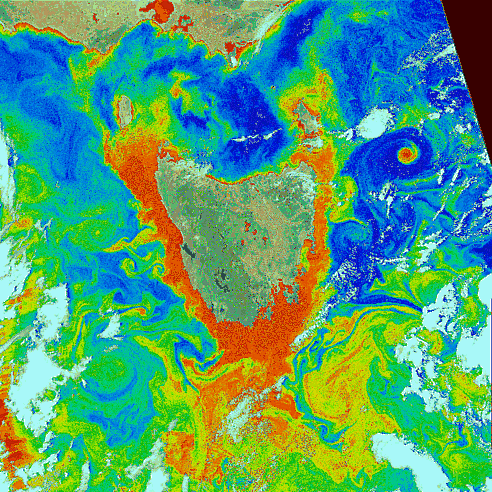
Ocean color around Tasmania (false color). Red and orange colors indicate high levels of phytoplankton.

The coastal zone color scanner (CZCS) was a multi-channel scanning radiometer aboard the Nimbus 7 satellite, predominately designed for water remote sensing. Nimbus 7 was launched 24 October 1978, and CZCS became operational on 2 November 1978. It was only designed to operate for one year (as a proof-of-concept), but in fact remained in service until 22 June 1986. Its operation on board the Nimbus 7 was limited to alternate days as it shared its power with the passive microwave scanning multichannel microwave radiometer.

CZCS measured reflected solar energy in six channels, at a resolution of 800 meters. These measurements were used to map chlorophyll concentration in water, sediment distribution, salinity, and the temperature of coastal waters and ocean currents. CZCS lay the foundations for subsequent satellite ocean color sensors, and formed a cornerstone for international efforts to understand the ocean's role in the carbon cycle.

== Ocean color ==
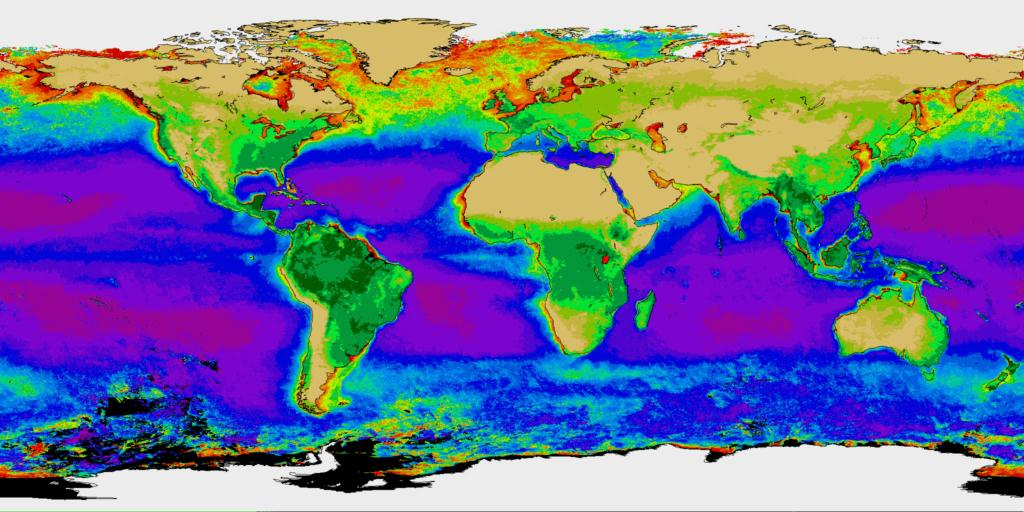
The Global Biosphere – a composite of all 60,000 CZCS images plus three years of land vegetation data collected by the Advanced Very High Resolution Radiometer instrument.

The most significant product of the CZCS was its collection of so-called ocean color imagery. The "color" of the ocean in CZCS images comes from substances in the water, particularly phytoplankton (microscopic, free-floating photosynthetic organisms), as well as inorganic particulates.

Because ocean color data is related to the presence of phytoplankton and particulates, it can be used to calculate the concentrations of material in surface waters and the level of biological activity; as phytoplankton concentration increases, ocean color shifts from blue to green (note that most CZCS images are false colored, so that high levels of phytoplankton appear as red or orange). Satellite-based ocean color observations provide a global picture of life in the world's oceans, because phytoplankton is the basis for the vast majority of oceanic food chains. By recording images over a period of years, scientists also gained a better understanding of how the phytoplankton biomass changed over time; for instance, red tide blooms could be observed when they grew. Ocean color measurements are also of interest because phytoplankton removes carbon dioxide from the sea water during photosynthesis, and so forms an important part of the global carbon cycle.

Raw data from the scanner were transmitted, at an average bit rate of 800 kbit/s, to the ground station, where they were saved on magnetic tape. The tapes were then sent to the Image Processing Division at Goddard Space Flight Center. The processed data were archived at Goddard, and available to scientists worldwide. The data were originally stored on 38,000 nine track magnetic tapes, and later migrated to optical disc.

The archive was one of the first instances of a system that provided a visual preview ("browse") of images, which assisted in ordering data. It became a model to be followed later by the Earth Observing System's Distributed Active Archive Centers.

CZCS was the first satellite ocean color sensor, and after it stopped observing in 1986, there was a 10-year gap in records until Japan launched the Ocean Color Temperature Scanner (OCTS) in 1996, and the United States launched the Sea-viewing Wide Field-of-view Sensor (SeaWiFS) in 1997. Current instruments that provide ocean color data include Aqua-MODIS, Copernicus Sentinel 3 Ocean and Land Colour Instrument (OLCI), and NOAA's Visible Infrared Imaging Radiometer Suite (VIIRS) on board the Joint Polar Satellite System (JPSS) satellites.

== Technical details ==
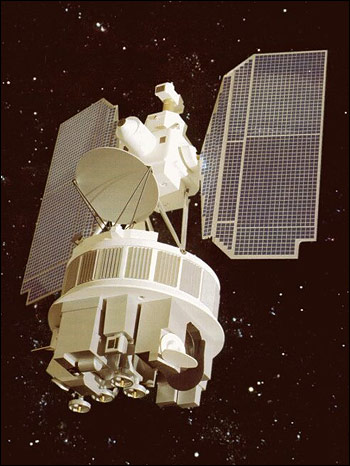
An artist's rendering of the Nimbus satellites' design

The CZCS instrument was manufactured by Ball Aerospace & Technologies Corp.

Reflected solar energy was measured in six channels to sense color caused by absorption due to chlorophyll, sediments, and colored dissolved organic matter in coastal waters. The CZCS used a rotating plane mirror at a 45-degree angle to the optic axis of a Cassegrain telescope. The mirror scanned 360 degrees but only the 80 degrees of data centered on nadir were collected for ocean color measurements. The instrument viewed deep space and calibration sources during the remainder of the scan. The incoming radiation was collected by the telescope and divided into two streams by a dichroic beam splitter. One stream was transmitted to a field stop that was also the entrance aperture of a small polychromator. The radiance that entered the polychromator was separated and re-imaged in five wavelengths on five silicon detectors in the focal plane of the polychromator. The other stream was directed to a cooled mercury cadmium telluride detector in the thermal region (10.5–12.5 micrometer). A radiative cooler was used to cool the thermal detector. To avoid sun glint, the scanner mirror was tilted about the sensor pitch axis on command so that the line of sight of the sensor was moved in 2-degree increments up to 20 degrees with respect to the nadir. Spectral bands at 0.443 and 0.670 micrometers centered on the most intense absorption bands of chlorophyll, while the band at 0.550 micrometers centered on the "hinge point," the wavelength of minimum absorption. Ratios of measured energies in these channels were shown to closely parallel surface chlorophyll concentrations. Data from the scanning radiometer were processed, with algorithms developed from the field experiment data, to produce maps of chlorophyll absorption. The temperatures of coastal waters and ocean currents were measured in a spectral band centered at 11.5 micrometers. Observations were made also in two other spectral bands, 0.520 micrometers for chlorophyll correlation and 0.750 micrometers for surface vegetation. The scan width was 1556 km centered on nadir and the ground resolution was 0.825 km at nadir.
