= Geostationary Ocean Color Imager =

Geostationary Ocean Color Imager (GOCI, /ɡɔːθi/), is the world's first geostationary orbit satellite image sensor in order to observe or monitor an ocean-color around the Korean Peninsula [1][2]. The spatial resolution of GOCI is about 500m and the range of target area is about 2,500 km×2,500 km centered on Korean Peninsula. GOCI was loaded on Communication, Ocean, and Meteorological Satellite (COMS) of South Korea which was launched in June, 2010. It will be operated by Korea Ocean Satellite Center (KOSC) at Korea Institute of Ocean Science & Technology (KIOST), and capture the images of ocean-color around the Korean Peninsula 8 times a day for 7.7 years.

The ocean data products that can be derived from the measurements are mainly the chlorophyll concentration, the optical diffuse attenuation coefficients, the concentration of dissolved organic material or yellow substance, and the concentration of suspended particles in the near-surface zone of the sea. In operational oceanography, satellite derived data products are used in conjunction with numerical models and in situ measurements to provide forecasting and now casting of the ocean state. Such information is of genuine interest for many categories of users.

== Vision and goals ==
- Detecting, monitoring and predicting short term biophysical phenomena
- Studies on biogeochemical variables and cycle
- Detecting, monitoring and predicting noxious or toxic algal blooms of notable extension
- Monitoring the health of marine ecosystem
- Coastal zone and resource management
- Producing an improved marine fisheries information to the fisherman communities
- Deriving Yellow dust and the land classified information

== GOCI specification ==
Description	Specification
Detector	CMOS (2D, 1415×1432 pixels)
Radiometric Calibration	Solar diffuser & DAMD(Diffuser Aging Monitoring Device)
Resolution (GSD)	500m
Total FOV	16 slots, 5,300×5,300 Pixels
Coverage	2,500 km×2,500 km
Longitude	128.2°E
Altitude	35,786 km
SNR	> 1,000
MTF	> 0.3
# of Bands	8개 (6-Visible, 2-NIR)
Spectral Coverage	400~900 nm

== GOCI bands ==
Band(#)	Central Wavelengths(nm)	Bandwidth(nm)	SNR	Type	Primary Application
1	412	20	1,000	Visible	Yellow substance and turbidity
2	443	20	1,090	Visible	Chlorophyll absorption maximum
3	490	20	1,170	Visible	Chlorophyll and other pigments
4	555	20	1,070	Visible	Turbidity, suspended sediment
5	660	20	1,010	Visible	Atmospheric correction for turbid water, Baseline of fluorescence signal, Chlorophyll, suspended sediment
6	680	10	870	Visible	fluorescence signal
7	745	20	860	NIR	Atmospheric correction and baseline of fluorescence signal
8	865	40	750	NIR	Atmospheric correction, vegetation, water vapor reference over the ocean

== See also ==
- Ocean color
- Remote sensing
- Geostationary orbit
