= Water remote sensing =

Observation of water bodies from a distance

Water Remote Sensing is the observation of water bodies such as lakes, oceans, and rivers from a distance in order to describe their color, state of ecosystem health, and productivity. Water remote sensing studies the color of water through the observation of the spectrum of water leaving radiance. From the spectrum of color coming from the water, the concentration of optically active components of the upper layer of the water body can be estimated via specific algorithms. Water quality monitoring by remote sensing and close-range instruments has obtained considerable attention since the founding of EU Water Framework Directive.

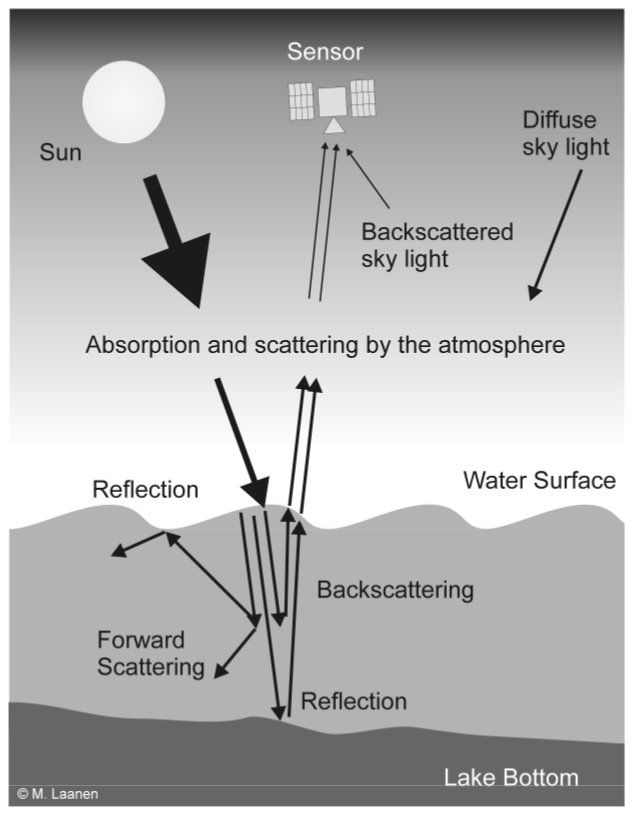
The path covered by light from the Sun through the water body to the remote sensing sensor

== Overview ==
Water remote sensing instruments (sensors) allow scientists to record the color of a water body, which provides information on the presence and abundance of optically active natural water components (plankton, sediments, detritus, or dissolved substances). The water color spectrum as seen by a satellite sensor is defined as an apparent optical property (AOP) of the water. This means that the color of the water is influenced by the angular distribution of the light field and by the nature and quantity of the substances in the medium, in this case, water. Thus, the values of remote sensing reflectance, an AOP, will change with changes in the optical properties and concentrations of the optically active substances in the water. Properties and concentrations of substances in the water are known as the inherent optical properties or IOPs. IOPs are independent from the angular distribution of light (the "light field") but they are dependent on the type and amount of substances that are present in the water. For instance, the diffuse attenuation coefficient of downwelling irradiance, K_{d} (often used as an index of water clarity or ocean turbidity) is defined as an AOP (or quasi-AOP), while the absorption coefficient and the scattering coefficient of the water are defined as IOPs. There are two different approaches to determine the concentration of optically active water components by the study of spectra, distributions of light energy over a range of wavelengths or colors. The first approach consist of empirical algorithms based on statistical relationships. The second approach consists of analytical algorithms based on the inversion of calibrated bio-optical models. Accurate calibration of the relationships and/or models used is an important condition for successful inversion on water remote sensing techniques and the determination of concentration of water quality parameters from observed spectral remote sensing data. Thus, these techniques depend on their ability to record these changes in the spectral signature of light backscattered from water surface and relate these recorded changes to water quality parameters via empirical or analytical approaches. Depending on the water constituents of interest and the sensor used, different parts of the spectrum will be analyzed.

== History ==
The gradual development of understanding of the transparency of natural waters and of the reason of their clarity variability and coloration has been sketched from the times of Henry Hudson (1600) to those of Chandrasekhara Raman (1930). However, the development of water remote sensing techniques (by the use of satellite imaging, aircraft or close range optical devices) didn't start until the early 1970s. These first techniques measured the spectral and thermal differences in the emitted energy from water surfaces. In general, empirical relationships were settled between the spectral properties and the water quality parameters of the water body. In 1974, Ritchie et al. (1974) developed an empirical approach to determine suspended sediments. This kind of empirical models are only able to use to determine water quality parameters of water bodies with similar conditions. In 1992 an analytical approach was used by Schiebe et al. (1992). This approach was based on the optical characteristics of water and water quality parameters to elaborate a physically based model of the relationship between the spectral and physical properties of the surface water studied. This physically based model was successfully applied in order to estimate suspended sediment concentrations.

== Applications ==
Example of specific phytoplankton absorption spectra. In this graph the characteristic blue and red Ch-a peaks at 438 nm and 676 nm can be seen. Another visible peak is the Cyanophicocianin absorption maximum at 624 nm.

By the use of optical close range devices (e.g. spectrometers, radiometers), airplanes or helicopters (airborne remote sensing) and satellites (space-borne remote sensing), the light energy radiating from water bodies is measured. For instance, algorithms are used to retrieve parameters such as chlorophyll-a(Chl-a) and Suspended Particulate Matter (SPM) concentration, the absorption by colored dissolved organic matter at 440 nm (aCDOM) and secchi depth. The measurement of these values will give an idea about the water quality of the water body being studied. A very high concentration of green pigments like chlorophyll might indicate the presence of an algal bloom, for example, due to eutrophication processes. Thus, the chlorophyll concentration could be used as a proxy or indicator for the trophic condition of a water body. In the same manner, other optical quality parameters such as suspended particles or Suspended Particulate matter (SPM), Colored Dissolved Organic Matter (CDOM), Transparency (Kd), and chlorophyll-a (Chl-a) can be used to monitor water quality.

== See also ==
- Ocean color
- Ocean optics
