= MERIS =

MEdium Resolution Imaging Spectrometer (MERIS) was one of the main instruments on board the European Space Agency (ESA)'s Envisat platform. The sensor was in orbit from 2002 to 2012. ESA formally announced the end of Envisat's mission on 9 May 2012.

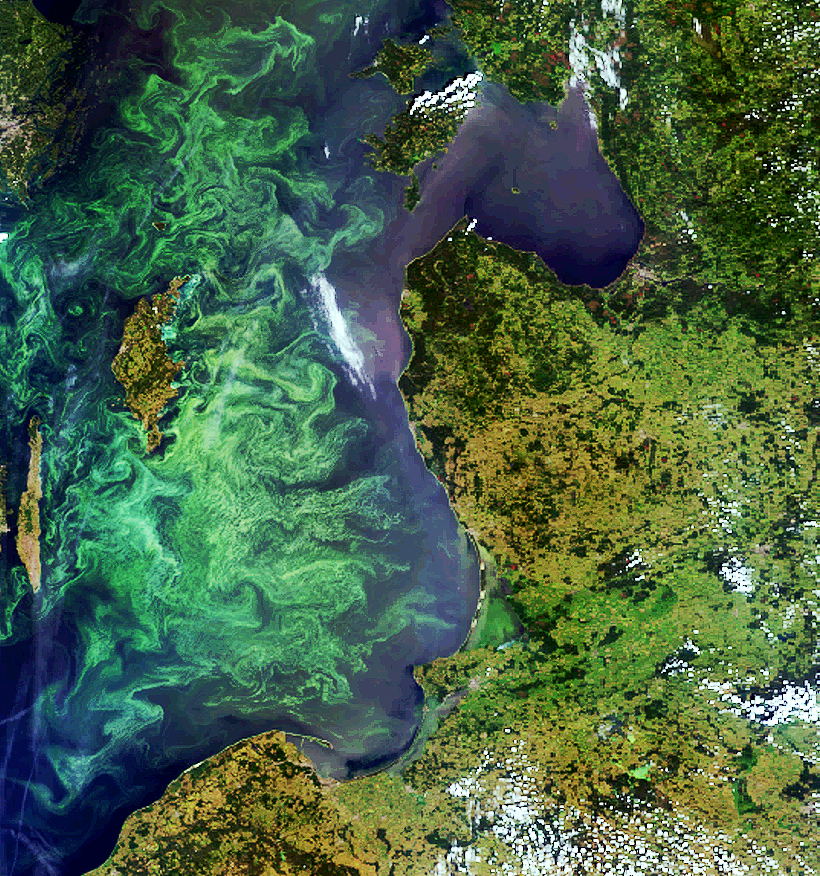
A colourful summer marine phytoplankton bloom fills much of the Baltic Sea in this image captured by Envisat's MERIS on 13 July 2005.

This instrument was composed of five cameras disposed side by side, each equipped with a pushbroom spectrometer. These spectrometers used two-dimensional CCDs. One of the sides of the detector was oriented perpendicular to the trajectory of the satellite and simultaneously collected, through the front optics, observations for a line of points at the Earth's surface (or in the atmosphere). The displacement of the platform along its orbit, combined with a short integration time, generated data that was later used to create two-dimensional images. A light dispersing system separated the various wavelengths (colors) composing the incoming radiation at the entrance of the instrument and directed these on the detector along the second dimension, i.e., along-track. These spectrometers acquired data in many spectral bands. For technical reasons only 16 of the bands were actually transmitted to the ground segment (one of which is required for the low-level processing of the raw data). This instrument thus provided useful data in 15 spectral bands, which were actually programmable in position, width and gain. In practice these technical characteristics were kept constant most of the time to allow many systematic or operational missions.

The intrinsic spatial resolution of the detectors provided for samples every 300 m near nadir at the Earth's surface, and the pushbroom design avoided or minimized the distortions (e.g., bow tie effects) typical of scanning instruments. This is known as the 'Full Resolution (FR)' product. The more common 'Reduced Resolution (RR)' products were generated by aggregating the FR data to a nominal resolution of 1200 m. The total field of view of MERIS was 68.5 degrees around nadir (yielding a swath width of 1150 km), which was sufficient to collect data for the entire planet every three days (in equatorial regions). Polar regions were visited more frequently due to the convergence of orbits.

The primary objective of MERIS was to observe the color of the ocean, both in the open ocean (clear or Case I waters) and in coastal zones (turbid or Case II waters). These observations were used to derive estimates of the concentration of chlorophyll and sediments in suspension in the water. It was also used for monitoring and mapping the deposits of seagrass Posidonia oceanica, in couple with the airborne HR/VHR (High/Very High Resolution) multispectral sensors for correcting the atmospheric and water column noise attenuation of the reflectance signals which arise from the shallow and turbid sea bottom waters in the Northern Mediterranean. These measurements are useful to study the oceanic component of the global carbon cycle and the productivity of these regions, amongst other applications. The characterization of atmospheric properties (gaseous absorption and aerosol scattering) is essential to derive accurate information over the oceans because they contribute to the bulk of the signal measured (under clear skies) or simply because clouds prevent the observation of the underlying surface. In addition, this instrument is useful to monitor the evolution of terrestrial environments, such as the fraction of the solar radiation effectively used by plants in the process of photosynthesis, amongst many others applications.

== See also ==
- Ocean color
- Sentinel-3
