= Marine optical buoy =

Oceanographic instrumentation

The marine optical buoy (MOBY) measures light at and very near the sea surface in a specific location over a long period of time, serving as part of an ocean color observation system. Satellites are another component of the system, providing global coverage through remote sensing; however, satellites measure light above the Earth's atmosphere, which is subject to interference from the atmosphere itself and other light sources. The Marine Optical Buoy helps alleviate that interference and thus improve the quality of the overall ocean color observation system.

== Physical description ==
MOBY is a buoy 15 meters tall floating vertically in the water with approximately 3 meters above the surface and 12 meters below. A float canister is at water level, measuring approximately 2 meters high and 1.5 meters in diameter above the water, 1 meter in diameter below the water. Above the float canister are four solar panels and an antenna column. From the bottom of the float canister, a central column descends to a 2-meter-high, 1-meter-diameter instrument canister. Along the central column are three standoff arms measuring 3 meters long, 2.5 meters long, and 2 meters long, respectively. The standoff arms can be relocated up and down the central column during maintenance. Light collectors are at the ends of the standoff arms and at the top of the antenna column. The antenna column includes Global Positioning System (GPS), very high frequency (VHF), and cellular telephone antennas. Computers, communications, and control electronics occupy the float canister. A marine optical system (MOS), a power system, and batteries occupy the instrument canister. The MOS includes spectrographs with charge-coupled device (CCD) detectors, an optical multiplexer, and fiber optic sensor lines to the light collectors.

MOBY has a tether to another buoy that is moored to the sea floor at a depth of about 1200 meters. MOBY is located at 20°49.0′N 157°11.5′W, west of Lanai, in the lee of the Hawaiian Islands.

== Function ==
Light from the Sun crosses space, enters and travels through the Earth's atmosphere, then enters the Earth's oceans. In the atmosphere and in the oceans, this light reflects from, refracts around, and absorbs into molecules and other objects. Some of this light leaves the water to again travel through the atmosphere and out into space, carrying the color of whatever it struck.

At the sea surface, light coming down through the atmosphere enters the collector at the top of MOBY's antenna column. Each of MOBY's three submerged standoff arms has a pair of light collectors: one on top of the arm to collect downward moving light; and one underneath the arm to collect upward moving reflected light. Light entering the collectors travels through optical fibers and the optical multiplexer to the CCD detectors and spectrographs. The spectrographs record the light signals, and a computer stores the measurement data. The communications system aboard MOBY daily transmits much of the light measurement data to operators on shore.

There is one Marine Optical Buoy operating in the water, and another in maintenance on shore. Every 3 to 4 months, a team exchanges the two buoys. The team calibrates each MOBY while it is in maintenance, both before deploying the buoy and after recovering it. Additionally, a team visits the MOBY in the water monthly, to clean algae, barnacles, and other organisms off the light collectors; and to generate independent comparison data using portable reference light sources. Each MOBY has internal reference light sources, as well, for continuous but not independent comparison. The MOBY calibration data traces to National Institute of Standards and Technology (NIST) radiometric standards directly, as opposed to using intermediate standards.

== Contribution ==
MOBY has generated calibrated measurements of ocean color at the sea surface since 1996. MOBY served as the primary sea surface calibration for satellite borne sensors such as the sea-viewing wide field-of-view sensor (SeaWiFS) and the moderate-resolution imaging spectroradiometer (MODIS). MOBY has contributed to the calibration of the Ocean Color and Temperature Sensor (OCTS), the polarization detection environmental radiometer (POLDER), and the Modular Optoelectronic Scanner (IRS1-MOS).

Long term sensors on the sea surface, such as MOBY, help improve the quality of the global ocean color observation system.
