= SeaWiFS =

Satellite-borne sensor designed to collect global ocean biological data

SeaWiFS (Sea-Viewing Wide Field-of-View Sensor) was a satellite-borne sensor designed to collect global ocean biological data. Active from September 1997 to December 2010, its primary mission was to quantify chlorophyll produced by marine phytoplankton (microscopic plants). Many of the objectives have been continued with other projects, such as the Terra MODIS, Aqua MODIS, Sentinel-3, and PACE mission.

== Instrument ==
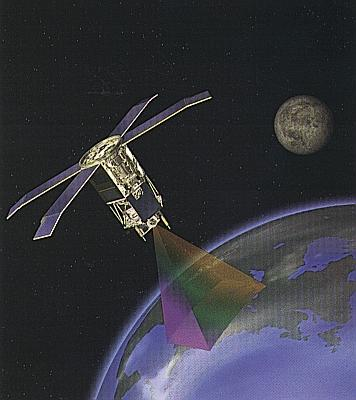
The SeaStar satellite, which carried SeaWiFS

SeaWiFS was the only scientific instrument on GeoEye's OrbView-2 (AKA SeaStar) satellite, and was a follow-on experiment to the Coastal Zone Color Scanner on Nimbus 7. Launched August 1, 1997 on an Orbital Sciences Pegasus small air-launched rocket, SeaWiFS began scientific operations on September 18, 1997 and stopped collecting data on December 11, 2010, far exceeding its designed operating period of 5 years. The sensor resolution is 1.1 km (LAC, "Local Area Coverage") and 4.5 km (GAC, "Global Area Coverage"). The sensor recorded information in the following optical bands:

Band	Wavelength
1	402–422 nm
2	433–453 nm
3	480–500 nm
4	500–520 nm
5	545–565 nm
6	660–680 nm
7	745–785 nm
8	845–885 nm

The instrument was specifically designed to monitor ocean characteristics such as chlorophyll-a concentration and water clarity. It was able to tilt up to 20 degrees to avoid sunlight from the sea surface. This feature is important at equatorial latitudes where glint from sunlight often obscures water colour. SeaWiFS had used the Marine Optical Buoy for vicarious calibration.

The SeaWiFS Mission is an industry/government partnership, with NASA's Ocean Biology Processing Group at Goddard Space Flight Center having responsibility for the data collection, processing, calibration, validation, archive and distribution. The current SeaWiFS Project manager is Gene Carl Feldman.

== Chlorophyll estimation ==
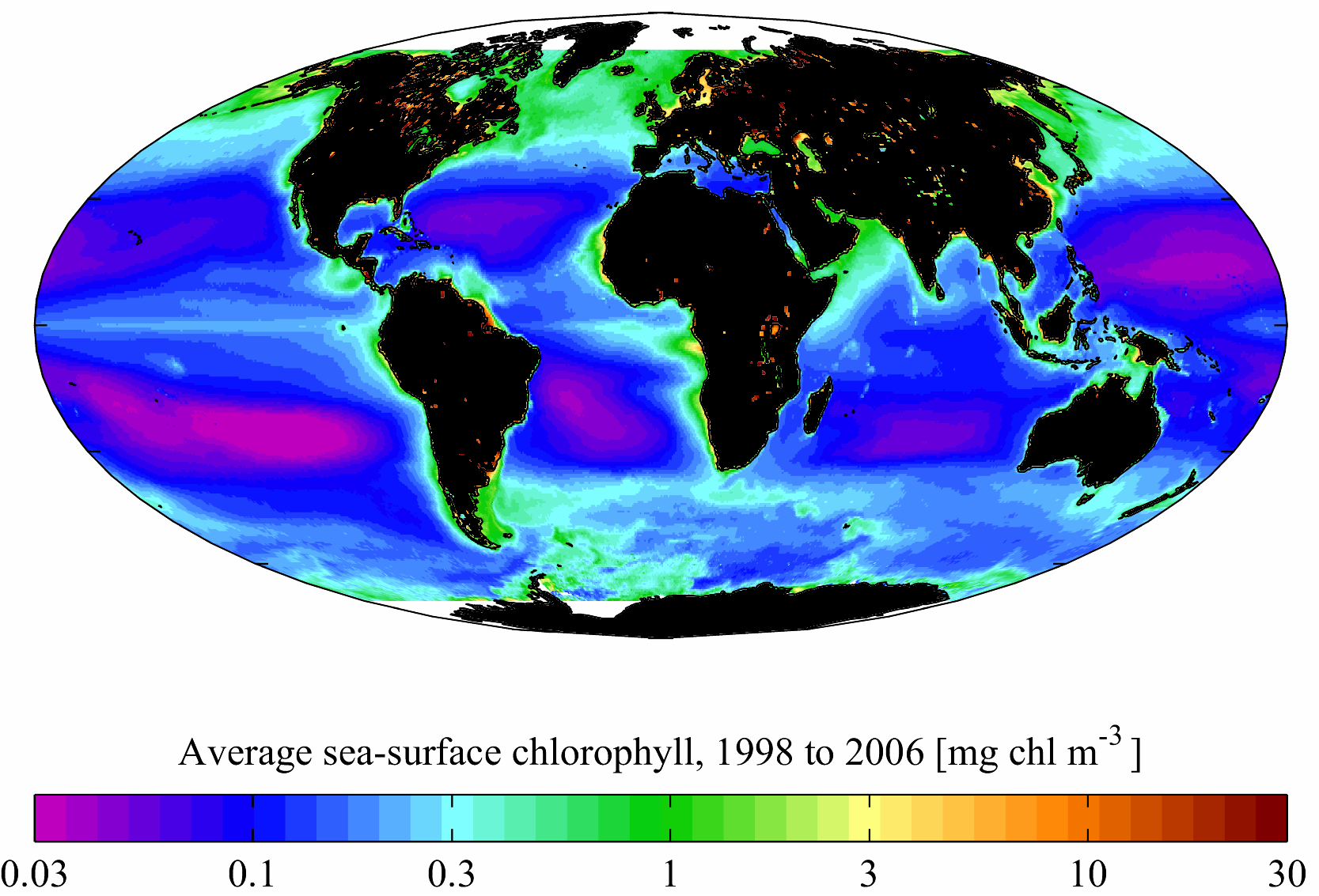
SeaWIFS-derived average sea surface chlorophyll for the period 1998 to 2006.

Chlorophyll concentrations are derived from images of the ocean's color. Generally speaking, the greener the water, the more phytoplankton are present in the water, and the higher the chlorophyll concentrations. Chlorophyll a absorbs more blue and red light than green, with the resulting reflected light changing from blue to green as the amount of chlorophyll in the water increases. Using this knowledge, scientists were able to use ratios of different reflected colors to estimate chlorophyll concentrations.

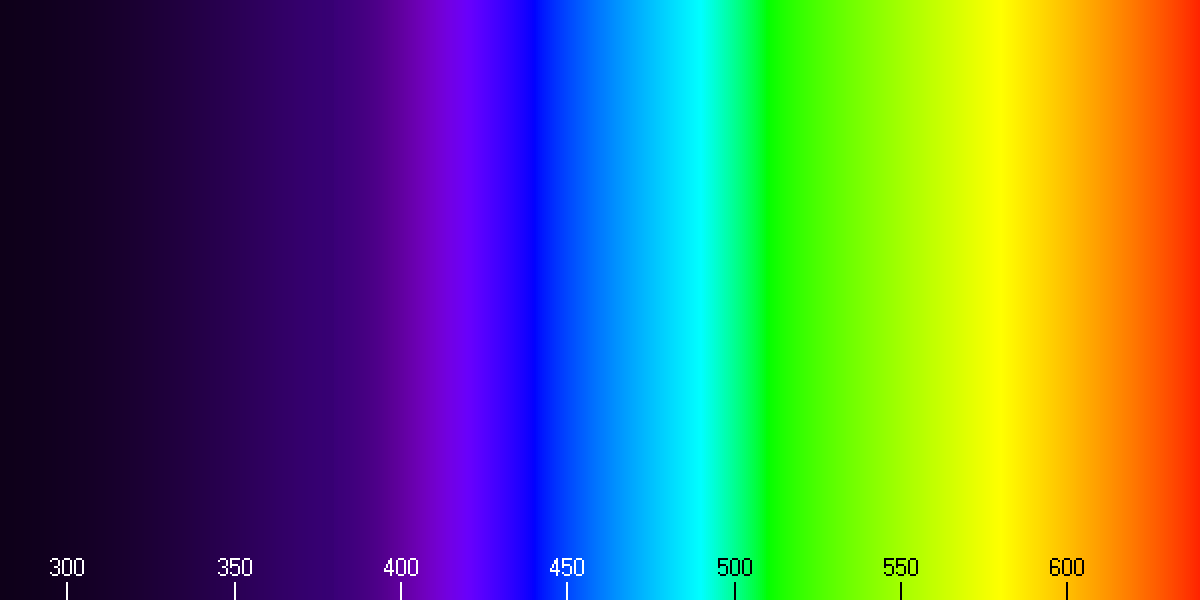
The visible color spectrum with corresponding wavelengths in nanometers

Many formulas estimate chlorophyll by comparing the ratio of blue to green light and relating those ratios to known chlorophyll concentrations from the same times and locations as the satellite observations. The color of light is defined by its wavelength, and visible light has wavelengths from 400 to 700 nanometers, progressing from violet (400 nm) to red (700 nm). A typical formula used for SeaWiFS data (termed OC4v4) divides the reflectance of the maximum of several wavelengths (443, 490, or 510 nm) by the reflectance at 550 nm. This roughly equates to a ratio of blue light to green light for two of the numerator wavelengths, and a ratio of two different green wavelengths for the other possible combination.

The reflectance (R) returned by this formula is then plugged into a cubic polynomial that relates the band ratio to chlorophyll.

$Chl = antilog(0.366-3.067\mathsf{R}+1.93\mathsf{R}^2 +0.64\mathsf{R}^3 -1.53\mathsf{R}^4)$

This formula, along with others, was derived empirically using observed chlorophyll concentrations. To facilitate these comparisons, NASA maintains a system of oceanographic and atmospheric data called SeaBASS (SeaWiFS Bio-optical Archive and Storage System). This data archive is used to develop new algorithms and validate satellite data products by matching chlorophyll concentrations measured directly with those estimated remotely from a satellite. These data can also be used to assess atmospheric correction (discussed below) that also can greatly influence chlorophyll concentration calculations.

Numerous chlorophyll algorithms were tested to see which ones best matched chlorophyll globally. Various algorithms perform differently in different environments. Many algorithms estimate chlorophyll concentrations more accurately in deep clear water than in shallow water. In shallow waters reflectance from other pigments, detritus, and the ocean bottom may cause inaccuracies. The stated goals of the SeaWiFS chlorophyll estimates are "… to produce water leaving radiances with an uncertainty of 5% in clear-water regions and chlorophyll a concentrations within ±35% over the range of 0.05–50 mg m-3.". When accuracy is assessed on a global scale, and all observations are grouped together, then this goal is clearly met. Many satellite estimates range from one-third to three times of those directly recorded at sea, though the overall relationship is still quite good. Differences arise when examined by region, though overall the values are still very useful. One pixel may not be particularly accurate, though when averages are taken over larger areas, the values average out and provide a useful and accurate view of the larger patterns. The benefits of chlorophyll data from satellites far outweigh any flaws in their accuracy simply by the spatial and temporal coverage possible. Ship-based measurements of chlorophyll cannot come close to the frequency and spatial coverage provided by satellite data.

== Atmospheric correction ==
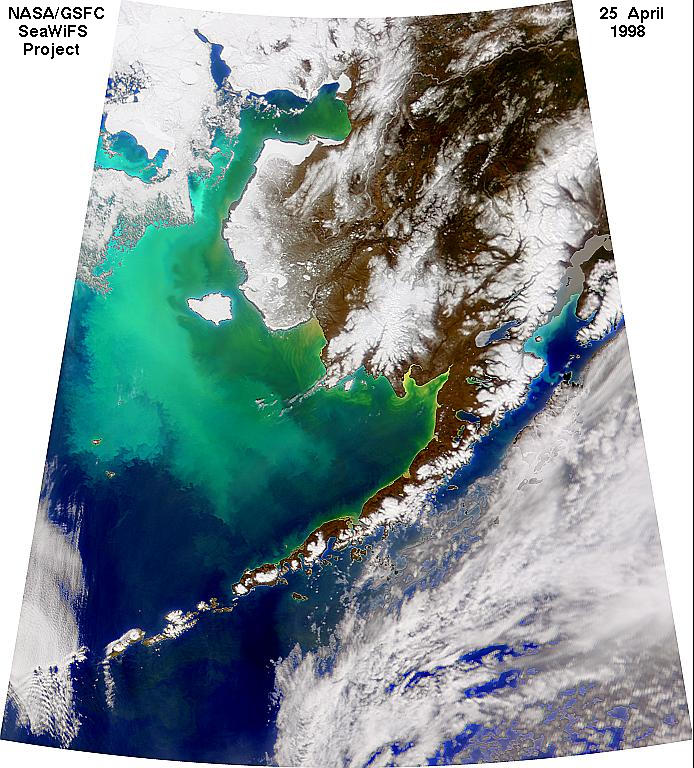
A true color SeaWiFS image of a coccolithophore phytoplankton bloom off of Alaska

Light reflected from the sub-surface ocean is called water-leaving radiance and is used to estimate chlorophyll concentrations. However, only about 5–10% of light at the top of the atmosphere is from water-leaving radiance. The remainder of light is reflected from the atmosphere and from aerosols within the atmosphere. In order to estimate chlorophyll concentrations this non-water-leaving radiance must be accounted for. Some light reflected from the ocean, such as from whitecaps and sun glint, must also be removed from chlorophyll calculations since they are representative ocean waves or the angle of the sun instead of the subsurface ocean. The process of removing these components is called atmospheric correction.

A description of the light, or radiance, observed by the satellite's sensor can be more formally expressed by the following radiative transfer equation:

$L_T(\lambda) = L_r(\lambda)+L_a(\lambda)+L_{ra}(\lambda)+TL_g(\lambda)+t(L_f(\lambda)+L_W(\lambda))$

Where L_{T}(λ) is total radiance at the top of the atmosphere, L_{r}(λ) is Rayleigh scattering by air molecules, L_{a}(λ) is scattering by aerosols in the absence of air, L_{ra}(λ) is interactions between air molecules and aerosols, TL_{g}(λ) is reflections from glint, t(L_{f}(λ) is reflections from foam, and L_{W}(λ)) is reflections from the subsurface of the water, or the water-leaving radiance. Others may divide radiance into some slightly different components, though in each case the reflectance parameters must be resolved in order to estimate water-leaving radiance and thus chlorophyll concentrations.

== Data products ==
Though SeaWiFS was designed primarily to monitor ocean chlorophyll a concentrations from space, it also collected many other parameters that are freely available to the public for research and educational purposes. These parameters aside from chlorophyll a include reflectance, the diffuse attenuation coefficient, particulate organic carbon (POC) concentration, particulate inorganic carbon (PIC) concentration, colored dissolved organic matter (CDOM) index, photosynthetically active radiation (PAR), and normalized fluorescence line height (NFLH). In addition, despite being designed to measure ocean chlorophyll, SeaWiFS also estimates Normalized Difference Vegetation Index (NDVI), which is a measure of photosynthesis on land.

== Data access ==
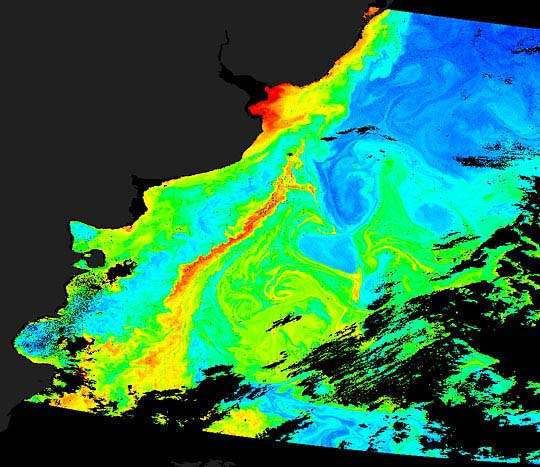
A false color SeaWiFS image shows a high concentration of phytoplankton chlorophyll in the Brazil Current Confluence region east of Argentina. Warm colors indicate high chlorophyll levels, and cooler colors indicate lower chlorophyll.

SeaWiFS data are freely accessible from a variety of websites, most of which are government run. The primary location for SeaWiFS data is NASA's OceanColor website , which maintains the time series of the entire SeaWiFS mission. The website allows users to browse individual SeaWiFS images based on time and area selections. The website also allows for browsing of different temporal and spatial scales with spatial scales ranging from 4 km to 9 km for mapped data. Data are provided at numerous temporal scales including daily, multiple days (e.g., 3, 8), monthly, and seasonal images, all the way up to composites of the entire mission. Data are also available via ftp and bulk download.

Data can be browsed and retrieved in a variety of formats and levels of processing, with four general levels from unprocessed to modeled output. Level 0 is unprocessed data that is not usually provided to users. Level 1 data are reconstructed but either unprocessed or minimally processed. Level 2 data contain derived geophysical variables, though are not on a uniform space/time grid. Level 3 data contain derived geophysical variables binned or mapped to a uniform grid. Lastly, Level 4 data contain modeled or derived variables such as ocean primary productivity .

Scientists who aim to create calculations of chlorophyll or other parameters that differ from those provided on the OceanColor website would likely use Level 1 or 2 data. This might be done, for example, to calculate parameters for a specific region of the globe, whereas the standard SeaWiFS data products are designed for global accuracy with necessary tradeoffs for specific regions. Scientists who are more interested in relating the standard SeaWiFS outputs to other processes will commonly use Level 3 data, particularly if they do not have the capacity, training, or interest in working with Level 1 or 2 data. Level 4 data may be used for similar research if interested in a modeled product.

== Software ==
NASA offers free software designed specifically to work with SeaWiFS data through the ocean color website. This software, entitled SeaDAS (SeaWiFS Data Analysis System), is built for visualization and processing of satellite data and can work with Level 1, 2, and 3 data. Though it was originally designed for SeaWiFS data, its capabilities have since been expanded to work with many other satellite data sources. Other software or programming languages can also be used to read in and work with SeaWiFS data, such as Matlab, IDL, or Python.

== Applications ==
Biological pump, air-sea cycling and sequestering of CO_{2}

Estimating the amount of global or regional chlorophyll, and therefore phytoplankton, has large implications for climate change and fisheries production. Phytoplankton play a huge role in the uptake of the world's carbon dioxide, a primary contributor to climate change. A percentage of these phytoplankton sink to ocean floor, effectively taking carbon dioxide out of the atmosphere and sequestering it in the deep ocean for at least a thousand years. Therefore, the degree of primary production from the ocean could play a large role in slowing climate change. Or, if primary production slows, climate change could be accelerated. Some have proposed fertilizing the ocean with iron in order to promote phytoplankton blooms and remove carbon dioxide from the atmosphere. Whether these experiments are undertaken or not, estimating chlorophyll concentrations in the world's oceans and their role in the ocean's biological pump could play a key role in our ability to foresee and adapt to climate change.

Phytoplankton is a key component in the base of the oceanic food chain and oceanographers have hypothesized a link between oceanic chlorophyll and fisheries production for some time. The degree to which phytoplankton relates to marine fish production depends on the number of trophic links in the food chain, and how efficient each link is. Estimates of the number of trophic links and trophic efficiencies from phytoplankton to commercial fisheries have been widely debated, though they have been little substantiated. More recent research suggests that positive relationships between chlorophyll a and fisheries production can be modeled and can be very highly correlated when examined on the proper scale. For example, Ware and Thomson (2005) found an r^{2} of 0.87 between resident fish yield (metric tons km-2) and mean annual chlorophyll a concentrations (mg m-3). Others have found the Pacific's Transition Zone Chlorophyll Front (chlorophyll density of 0.2 mg m-3) to be defining feature in loggerhead turtle distribution.
