= Ocean turbidity =

Measure of cloudiness of sea water

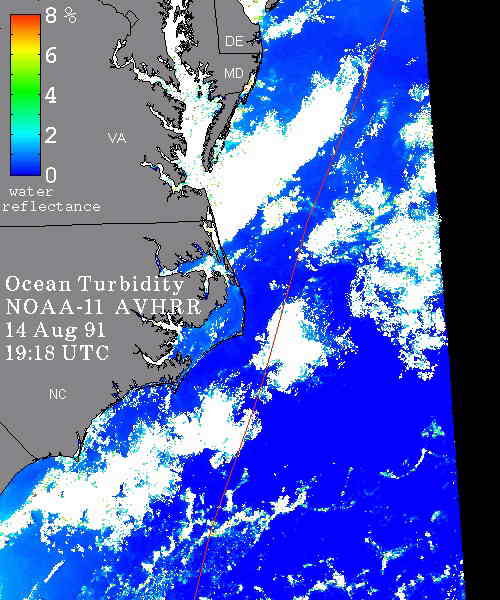
Visualisation of the ocean turbidity of the ocean just before Hurricane Bob (August 14, 1991)

Ocean turbidity is a measure of the amount of cloudiness or haziness in sea water caused by individual particles that are too small to be seen without magnification. Highly turbid ocean waters are those with many scattering particulates in them. In both highly absorbing and highly scattering waters, visibility into the water is reduced. Highly scattering (turbid) water still reflects much light, while highly absorbing water, such as a blackwater river or lake, is very dark. The scattering particles that cause the water to be turbid can be composed of many things, including sediments and phytoplankton.

== Measurement ==
There are a number of ways to measure ocean turbidity, including autonomous remote vehicles, shipcasts and satellites.

From a satellite, a proxy measurement of the water turbidity can be made by examining the amount of reflectance in the visible region of the electromagnetic spectrum. For the Advanced Very High Resolution Radiometer (AVHRR), the logical choice is band 1, covering wavelengths 580 to 680 nanometres, the orange and red. In order to make derived products that are comparable over time and space, an atmospheric correction is required. To do this, the effects of Rayleigh scattering are calculated based on the satellite viewing angle and the solar zenith angle and then subtracted from the band 1 radiance. For an aerosol correction, band 2 in the near infrared is used. It is first corrected for Rayleigh scattering and then subtracted from the Rayleigh corrected band 1. The Rayleigh corrected band 2 is assumed to be aerosol radiance because no return signal from water in the near infrared is expected since water is highly absorbing at those wavelengths. Because bands 1 and 2 are relatively close on the electromagnetic spectrum, we can reasonably assume their aerosol radiances are the same.

In these images the turbidity is quantified as the percent reflected light emerging from the water column in a range of 0 to 8 percent. The reflectance percentage can be correlated to attenuation, Secchi disk depth or total suspended solids although the exact relationship will vary regionally and depends on the optical properties of the water. For example, in Florida Bay, 10% reflectance corresponds to a sediment concentration of 30 milligrams/litre and a Secchi depth of 0.5 metre. These relationships are approximately linear so that 5% reflectance would correspond to a sediment concentration of approximately 15 milligrams/litre and a Secchi depth of 1 metre. In the Mississippi River plume regions these same reflectance values would represent sediment concentrations that are about ten times or more higher.

== Hurricanes ==
As one would expect, the majority of these images reveal large increases in turbidity in the regions where a hurricane has made landfall. The increases are primarily due to sediments that have been resuspended from the shallow bottom regions. In areas near shore some of the signal may also be due to sediments eroded from beaches as well as from sediment laden river plumes. In some cases a post-hurricane phytoplankton bloom due to increased nutrient availability may perhaps be detectable.

The examination of the turbidity after the passing of a hurricane can have potentially many uses for coastal resource management including:

- identifying regional "hot spots" where the erosion could be expected to be most severe
- estimating the total sediment concentration that has been mobilized by the hurricane
- determining the spatial extent of the sediment mobilization
- identifying the extent and contribution of river plumes
- assessing and predicting potential ecosystem impacts

With regard to these uses, determining the regions of high turbidity will allow managers to best decide on response strategies as well as help ensure that post-hurricane resources are most effectively utilized.

== Interpreting images ==
Only a small fraction of the light incident on the ocean will be reflected and received by the satellite. The probability for a photon to reflect and exit the ocean decreases exponentially with length of its path through the water because the ocean is an absorbing medium. The more ocean a photon must travel through, the greater its chances of being absorbed by something. After absorption, it will eventually become part of the ocean's heat reservoir. The absorption and scattering characteristics of a water body determine the rate of vertical light attenuation and set a limit to the depths contributing to a satellite signal. A reasonable rule of thumb is that 90 percent of the signal coming from the water that is seen by the satellite is from the first attenuation length. How deep this is depends on the absorption and scattering properties of both the water itself and other constituents in the water. For wavelengths in the near infrared and longer, the penetration depth varies from a metre to a few micrometres. For band 1, the penetration depth will usually be between 1 and 10 metres. If the water has a large turbidity spike below 10 metres, the spike is unlikely to be seen by a satellite.

For very shallow clear water there is a good chance the bottom may be seen. For example, in the Bahamas, the water is quite clear and only a few metres deep, resulting in an apparent high turbidity because the bottom reflects much band 1 light. For areas with consistently high turbidity signals, particularly areas with relatively clear water, part of the signal may be due to bottom reflection. Normally this will not be a problem with a post-hurricane turbidity image since the storm easily resuspends enough sediment such that bottom reflection is negligible.

Clouds are also problematic for the interpretation of satellite derived turbidity. Cloud removal algorithms perform a satisfactory job for pixels that are fully cloudy. Partially cloudy pixels are much harder to identify and typically result in false high turbidity estimates. High turbidity values near clouds are suspect.

== See also ==
- Dissolved organic carbon (DOC)
