= Colored dissolved organic matter =

Optically measurable component of the dissolved organic matter in water

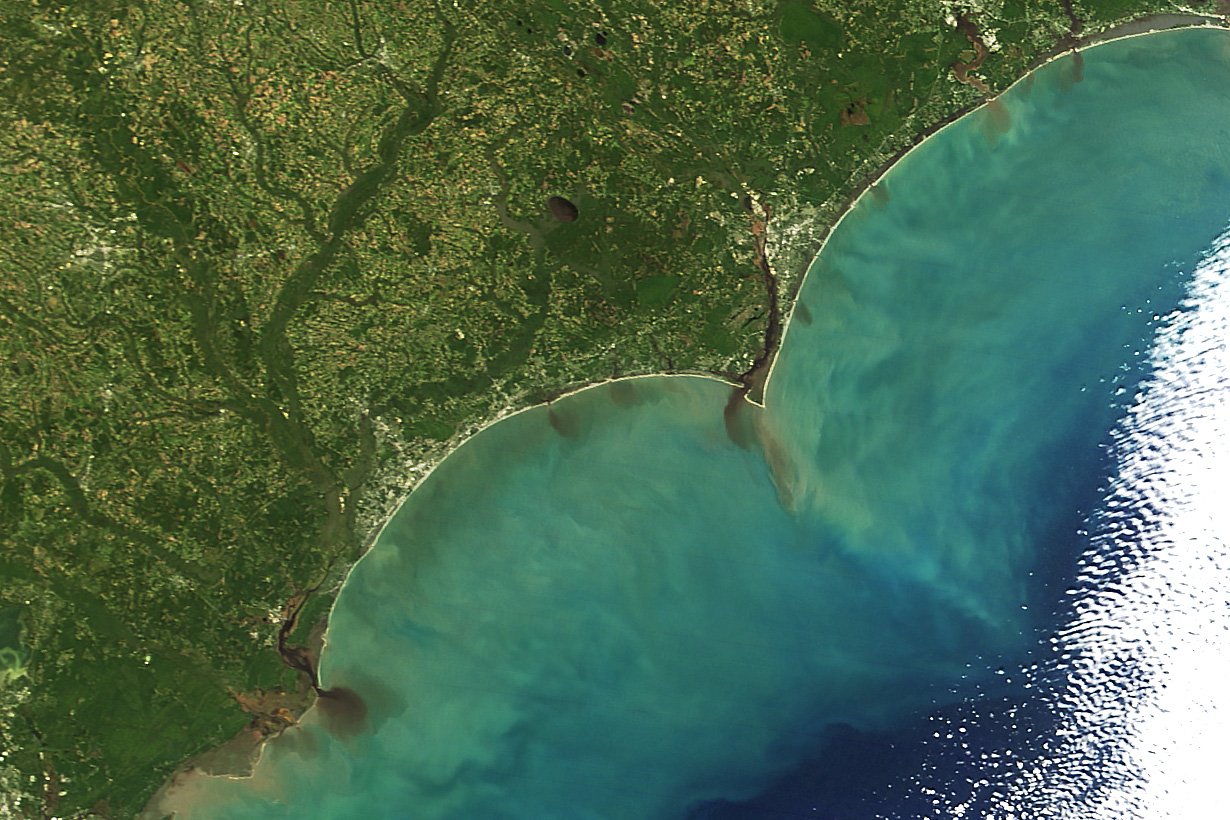
Variations in the concentration of colored dissolved organic matter as seen from space. The dark brown water in the inland waterways contains high concentrations of CDOM. As this dark, CDOM-rich water moves offshore, it mixes with the low CDOM, blue ocean water from offshore.

Colored dissolved organic matter (CDOM) is the optically measurable component of dissolved organic matter in water. Also known as chromophoric dissolved organic matter, yellow substance, and gelbstoff, CDOM occurs naturally in aquatic environments and is a complex mixture of individual, unique organic matter molecules, which are primarily leached from decaying detritus and organic matter. CDOM most strongly absorbs short wavelength light ranging from blue to ultraviolet, whereas pure water absorbs longer wavelength red light. Water with little to no CDOM, such as the open ocean, appears blue. Waters containing high amounts of CDOM can range from brown, as in many rivers, to yellow and yellow-brown in coastal waters. CDOM is ubiquitous in the ocean and absorbs light energy, thus influencing water optics, phytoplankton photosynthesis, and photodegradation. Levels of CDOM can also be used as a flexible indicator of salinity, primary productivity, and oceanic circulation. CDOM influences water quality by both sequestering toxic compounds such as polyaromatic hydrocarbons (PAHs) and by producing harmful compounds such as chlorine disinfection byproducts like trihalomethanes and haloacetic acids. Sources of CDOM vary between organic matter derived from terrestrial, marsh, and marine systems. CDOM compounds can also originate from marine algae to a lesser extent. Different sources of organic matter have distinct CDOM signatures that may need to be considered when applying generalized models to CDOM measurements. Measurement of CDOM is typically accomplished through spectroscopy and fluorometry, but new optical techniques have arisen including remote-satellite sensing. Lastly, CDOM plays a role in global carbon cycling and may be impacted by anthropogenic forces such as logging and agriculture, along with climate change factors such as increased precipitation, permafrost thawing, UV radiation, and ocean stratification.

== Significance ==
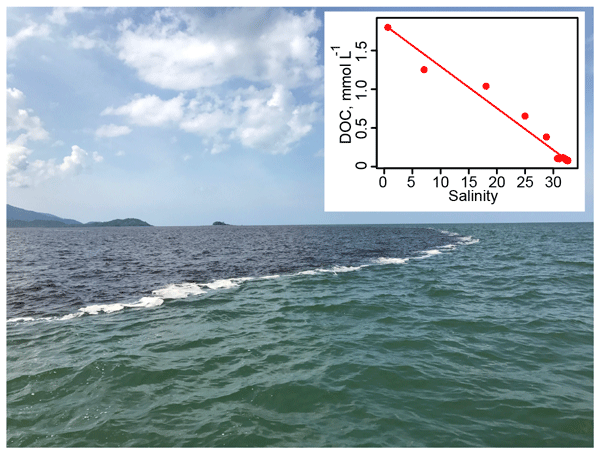
Peatland river water draining into coastal waters South-East Asia is home to one of the world's largest stores of tropical peatland and accounts for roughly 10 % of the global land-to-sea dissolved organic carbon (DOC) flux. The rivers carry high coloured dissolved organic matter (CDOM) concentrations, shown here interfacing with ocean shelf water.

The concentration of CDOM can have a significant effect on biological activity in aquatic systems. CDOM diminishes light intensity as it penetrates water. Very high concentrations of CDOM can have a limiting effect on photosynthesis and inhibit the growth of phytoplankton, which form the basis of oceanic food chains and are a primary source of atmospheric oxygen. However, the influence of CDOM on algal photosynthesis can be complex in other aquatic systems like lakes where CDOM increases photosynthetic rates at low and moderate concentrations, but decreases photosynthetic rates at high concentrations. CDOM concentrations reflect hierarchical controls. Concentrations vary among lakes in close proximity due to differences in lake and watershed morphometry, and regionally because of difference in climate and dominant vegetation. CDOM also absorbs harmful UVA/B radiation, protecting organisms from DNA damage.

Absorption of UV radiation causes CDOM to "bleach", reducing its optical density and absorptive capacity. This bleaching (photodegradation) of CDOM produces low-molecular-weight organic compounds which may be utilized by microbes, release nutrients that may be used by phytoplankton as a nutrient source for growth, and generates reactive oxygen species, which may damage tissues and alter the bioavailability of limiting trace metals.

CDOM can be detected and measured from space using satellite remote sensing and often interferes with the use of satellite spectrometers to remotely estimate phytoplankton populations. As a pigment necessary for photosynthesis, chlorophyll is a key indicator of the phytoplankton abundance. However, CDOM and chlorophyll both absorb light in the same spectral range so it is often difficult to differentiate between the two.

While there is interference between CDOM and chlorophyll measurements, CDOM levels monitored by remote satellites can serve as a proxy for water quality, salinity, primary productivity, and oceanic circulation. CDOM can contaminate water by reacting with chlorine species to form disinfectants, or by decreasing amounts of dissolved oxygen which draws harmful metals out of sediments. However, CDOM can also help purify water by sequestering trace metals and polyaromatic hydrocarbons. CDOM is the only optical biomarker in water that has a significant relationship with salinity. This is because CDOM is highest in freshwater systems and thus negatively correlated with salinity in coastal regions. Satellite measurements of ocean color are useful for analyzing chlorophyll concentration and phytoplankton activity, but models often differ in the ways they account for the effect of CDOM, leading to a possible 30% discrepancy in global primary productivity values. The amount of CDOM loading may also impact the Secchi depth, which is a measure of water transparency. Oceanic circulation influences subsurface levels of CDOM via the dynamic interaction of vertical ventilation and in situ generation. Monitoring CDOM levels can thus be used as a tracer for global ocean circulation.

== Measurement ==
Traditional methods of measuring CDOM include UV-visible spectroscopy (absorbance) and fluorometry (fluorescence). Optical proxies have been developed to characterize sources and properties of CDOM, including specific ultraviolet absorbance at 254 nm (SUVA_{254}) and spectral slopes for absorbance, and the fluorescence index (FI), biological index (BIX), and humification index (HIX) for fluorescence. Excitation emission matrices (EEMs) can be resolved into components in a technique called parallel factor analysis (PARAFAC), where each component is often labelled as "humic-like", "protein-like", etc. As mentioned above, remote sensing is the newest technique to detect CDOM from space.

== Sources of CDOM ==
Organic matter is the primary source of CDOM in freshwater and saltwater ecosystems and can come from a variety of sources such as soils, plant matter, estuaries, tidal marshes, and the ocean itself. Ultimately, the main source of CDOM comes from higher plants. Typically, CDOM exhibits seasonal variation in spectral identity. Terrestrial carbon sources from fresh plant material dominate the spring and summer, when precipitation and melting is high, while older, more degraded carbon sources dominate the winter. The source of organic matter for CDOM affects CDOM fluorescent (fDOM) measurement values used as a proxy. For example, there are significant differences between CDOM:fDOM ratios when comparing terrestrial sources to marsh sources, indicating that these carbon sources possess unique optical properties that cannot be generalized to a universal ratio. Moreover, it has been shown that CDOM from tidal marshes is optically distinct relative to CDOM from nearby estuaries in terms of absorption, thus there is great variation in CDOM source and optical properties.

== Impacts of Anthropogenic Forces and Climate Change ==
Although variations in CDOM are primarily the result of natural processes including changes in the amount and frequency of precipitation, human activities such as logging, agriculture, effluent discharge, and wetland drainage can affect CDOM levels in fresh water and estuarine systems, forming unique, human-derived CDOM signatures. In general, pools of CDOM that have been influenced by humans tend to have greater microbial-like, aliphatic constituents, while pools influenced by natural processes such as precipitation typically have higher residual amounts of humic-rich, allochthonous forms of CDOM. Nutrient pollution caused by fertilizers and fossil fuels increases freshwater nutrient loading, leading to increased eutrophication and subsequent changes to CDOM cycling through microbial metabolism. Increased eutrophication can also impact CDOM composition, with algal-based CDOM having more aliphatic, proteinaceous, and humic components. While local anthropogenic effects on CDOM tend to be highly context-dependent, overall, both anthropogenic forces and climate change are predicted to synergistically increase total levels of CDOM. This projected increase in the levels of CDOM loads is known as "browning" and is partially due to a recovery from acidification and afforestation.

Increased precipitation from climate change may elevate CDOM loads through increased base flow discharge of rivers emptying organic matter into the ocean. In arctic regions, increased snowmelt and permafrost thawing from climate warming can increase CDOM from the release of stored carbon reserves in arctic soils that have higher aliphatic content and lower molecular weight. Increased loading of CDOM from climate change may decrease the amount of light penetrating the ocean, decreasing the Secchi depth and limiting primary productivity. Further, the combined effects of increased UV radiation from climate change, along with the increased stratification and the thinning of warmer ocean surface layers results in increased photodegradation of CDOM. Increased photodegradation of CDOM has ramifications of producing more usable carbon fuel for microbial heterotrophs, allowing these bacteria to outcompete phytoplankton and further limit primary productivity.

Human-derived and natural pools of CDOM may compete with each other through having opposing effects on carbon outgassing, nutrient cycling, and microbial metabolism. In aquatic systems, increased levels of human-marked CDOM may increase emissions of greenhouse gases such as CO_{2} and CH_{4.} Higher levels of human-derived CDOM may also increase photoreactivity and decrease carbon burial.

== See also ==
- Blackwater river
- Color of water
- Dissolved organic carbon (DOC)
- Ocean turbidity
- Secchi disk
