= Spectroradiometry for Earth and planetary remote sensing =

- Portal
- Earth Sciences Portal
- Relevant Disciplines
- Geology
- Remote Sensing
- Related Information
- Spectroradiometer
- Spectroscopy
- Radiometry

Spectroradiometry is a technique in Earth and planetary remote sensing, which makes use of light behaviour, specifically how light energy is reflected, emitted, and scattered by substances, to explore their properties in the electromagnetic (light) spectrum and identify or differentiate between them. The interaction between light radiation and the surface of a given material determines the manner in which the radiation reflects back to a detector, i.e., a spectroradiometer. Combining the elements of spectroscopy and radiometry, spectroradiometry carries out precise measurements of electromagnetic radiation and associated parameters within different wavelength ranges. This technique forms the basis of multi- and hyperspectral imaging and reflectance spectroscopy, commonly applied across numerous geoscience disciplines, which evaluates the spectral properties exhibited by various materials found on Earth and planetary bodies.

Spectral properties such as brightness and reflectance patterns vary depending on the mineralogical compositions and crystalline structures of the given material. This variation is contributed by the presence of spectrally active components within the material, such as metallic oxides and clay minerals, which give rise to unique absorption features. Upon measurements with a spectroradiometer, these absorption features can be quantified as characteristic absorption bands in a reflectance spectra. The specific shapes associated with the bands that occur at distinctive wavelength positions enable the identification of minerals and facilitate lithological interpretations.

Conventionally, spectroradiometry is applied to the following portions of wavelengths in the electromagnetic (light) spectrum:

- Ultraviolet (UV): 1 nm – 400 nm
- Visible-near Infrared (VNIR): 400 nm – 750 nm
- Short-wave Infrared (SWIR): 750 nm – 2500 nm
- Mid Infrared (MIR): 2500 nm – 5000 nm
- Thermal Infrared (TIR): 7500 nm – 15000 nm

Today, geological applications with spectroradiometers are within the visible-near infrared and short-wave infrared wavelength ranges. It thereby assists the study of geological processes, the exploration for natural resources, and reconstruction of past environments and climates.

== Experimental use ==
In spectroradiometry, spectral features can be recognized and quantified by making use of the spectra containing different parameters measured by spectroradiometers. The most widely used spectral parameter in spectroradiometry for applications in geosciences is reflectance.

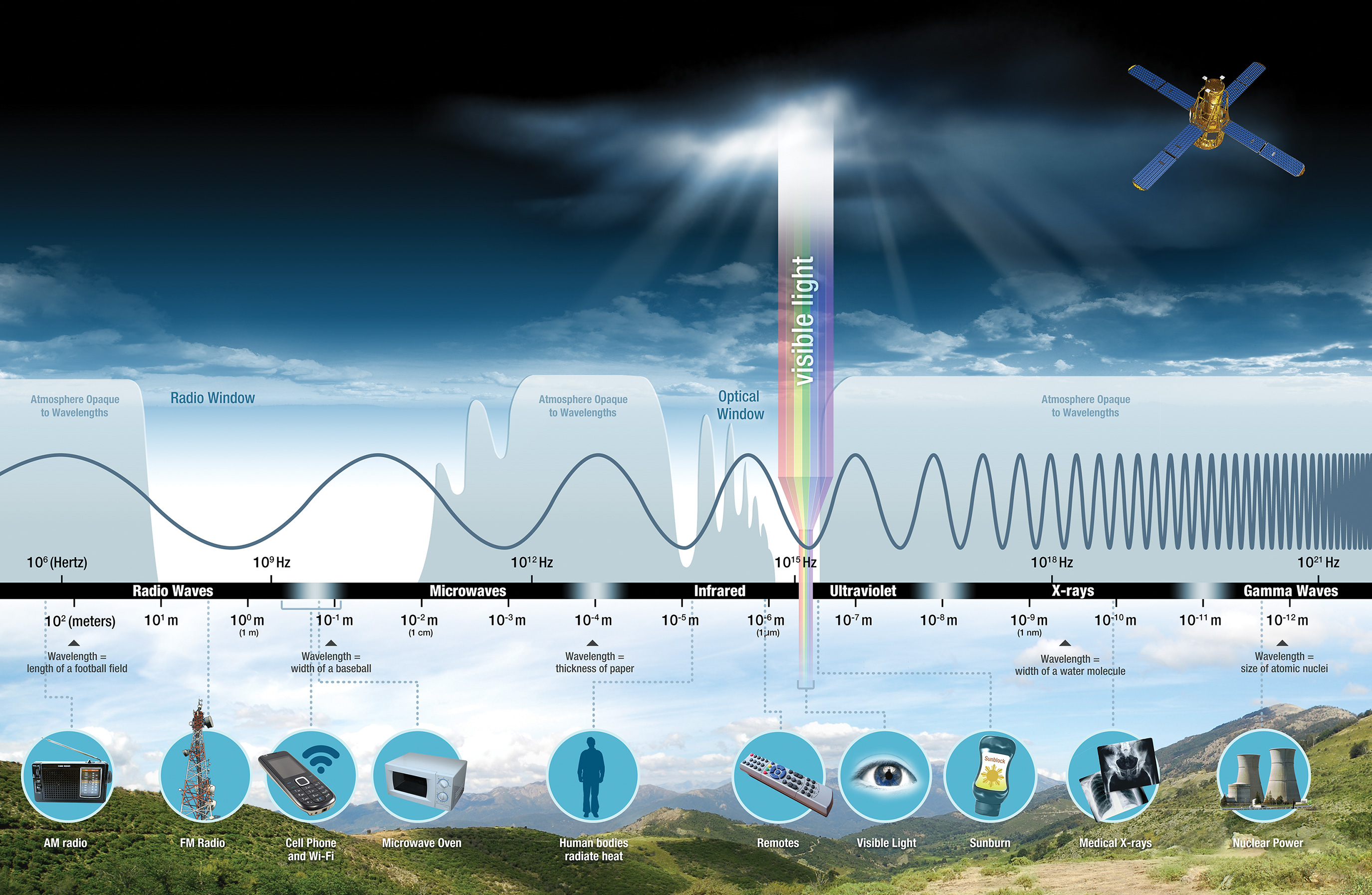
A visualization of different wavelength intervals in the electromagnetic (light) spectrum. Each category of wavelength intervals enables the identification and characterization of substances through their unique spectral features, patterns, and signatures.

Spectroradiometry can be imaging and non-imaging in practice. Imaging spectroradiometry captures spectral data from a specific region or a scene, creating a two-dimensional image with recorded spectral information dedicated to each pixel. Non-imaging spectroradiometry, on the contrary, measures spectral data from a single point or a small focused area, offering more detailed information about the spectral properties of a specific material.

=== Experimental set-up ===
The experimental set-up for imaging spectroradiometry is simple because image processing can be conducted through computer software to show the spectral parameters for analysis, such as reflectance and brightness. Most images are freely available worldwide, widely used by different institutions, and have an extensive spatial coverage. Values of spectral parameters like reflectance can then be directly extracted from all pixels in the imagery, aggregated and averaged to produce a reflectance curve for spectral analysis.

In terms of non-imaging spectroradiometry, data collection and sampling are usually conducted through direct scanning with spectroradiometers in the laboratory or in the field. To ensure data accuracy, it is important to carry out the experiment under a stable and controlled environment. For instance, most laboratory scanning practices are performed in the dark to minimize ambient light and scattering, while field scanning is typically conducted with a contact scanning probe, such that measurements are taken in direct contact with the sample surface, free from external light sources, and in a localized setting. In both scenarios, the spectroradiometers are frequently calibrated with a white diffusion reflectance panel, which provides a reference reflectance value (99%) to maintain experimental accuracy. During spectral measurements, they exert homogeneous illumination straight towards the sample surface. Spectral data acquired will then be presented through digital software associated with the spectroradiometers.

=== Analysis of spectral features ===
Reflectance appears as individual absorption bands spanning the electromagnetic spectra, which vary with mineralogy and chemical compositions. Reflectance spectra obtained directly from the spectroradiometers without data processing are known as raw reflectance spectra. Although some prominent patterns of absorption may be identified, they are prone to influence from the overall spectra trends, and features like amplitudes and magnitudes could mislead the interpretations under such circumstances.

In order to facilitate data analysis, the raw reflectance spectra are commonly normalized to provide better visualization and quantification of trends and patterns of spectral parameters. This is commonly done by statistical techniques including detrending and continuum removal.

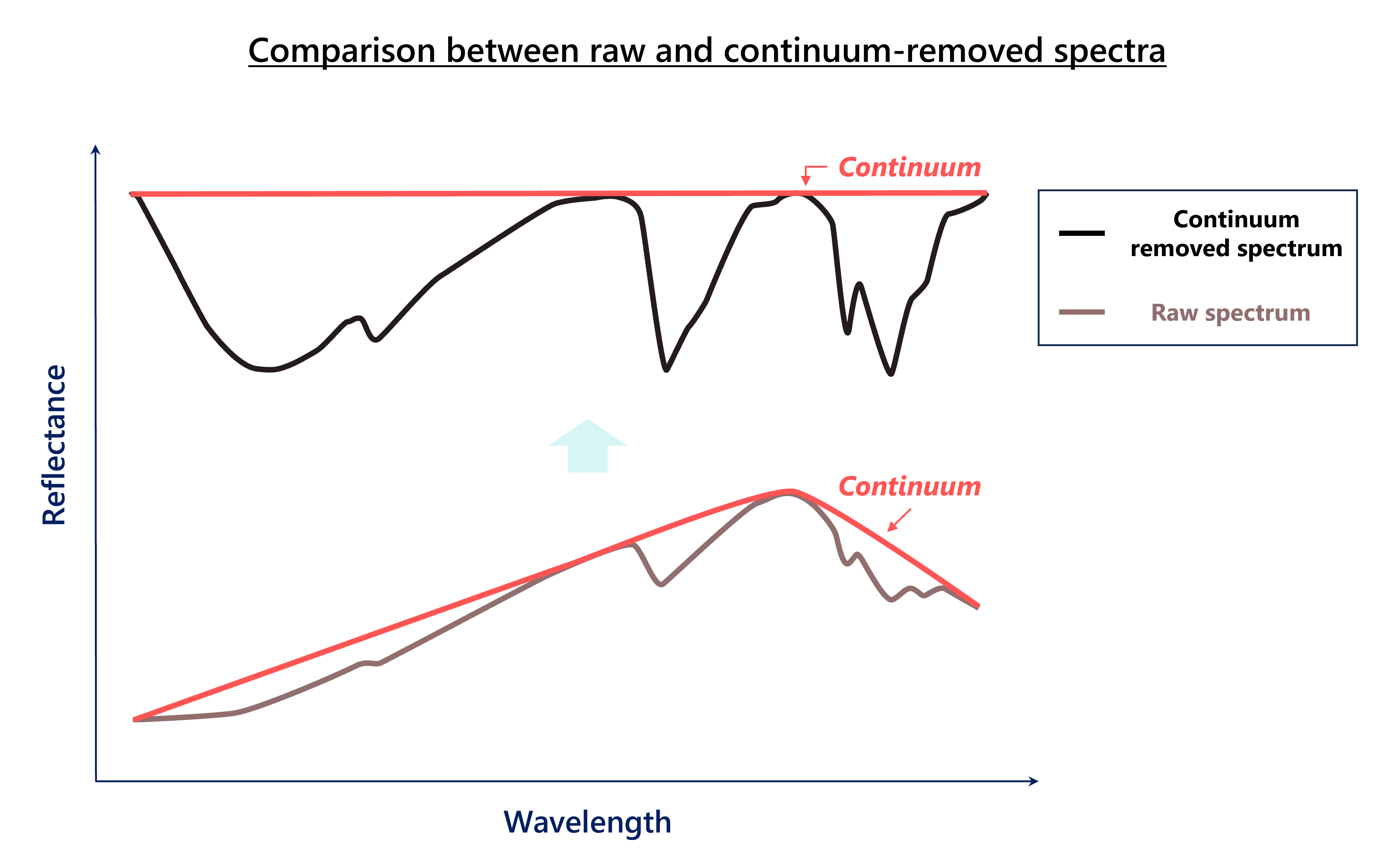
A comparison of a reflectance spectra for a given material before and after the continuum removal process, modified from Tan et al., 2021. The overall shape, level changes, and slopes are eliminated in the continuum removed spectrum with reference to the continuum lines, which further enhances the clarity of individual absorption features in the reflectance spectrum.

==== Detrending ====
Removing the trend components present in the raw reflectance spectra to produce detrended spectra (usually flattened) revealing the true shapes, patterns, and distributions of absorption features.

==== Continuum removal (Convex hull transformation) ====
Removing overall shape, level changes, and slopes induced by other materials in the raw reflectance spectra (indicated as continuum lines) to produce continuum-removed spectra which allows effective comparison of the individual absorption features under a common baseline.

From the normalized spectra, spectral features can be accurately identified, analyzed, and compared to that among different materials. Spectrograms can also be generated using the normalized spectra to further enhance visualization. The features can be characterized using geometrical parameters describing the shapes and appearance of a particular reflectance spectrum:

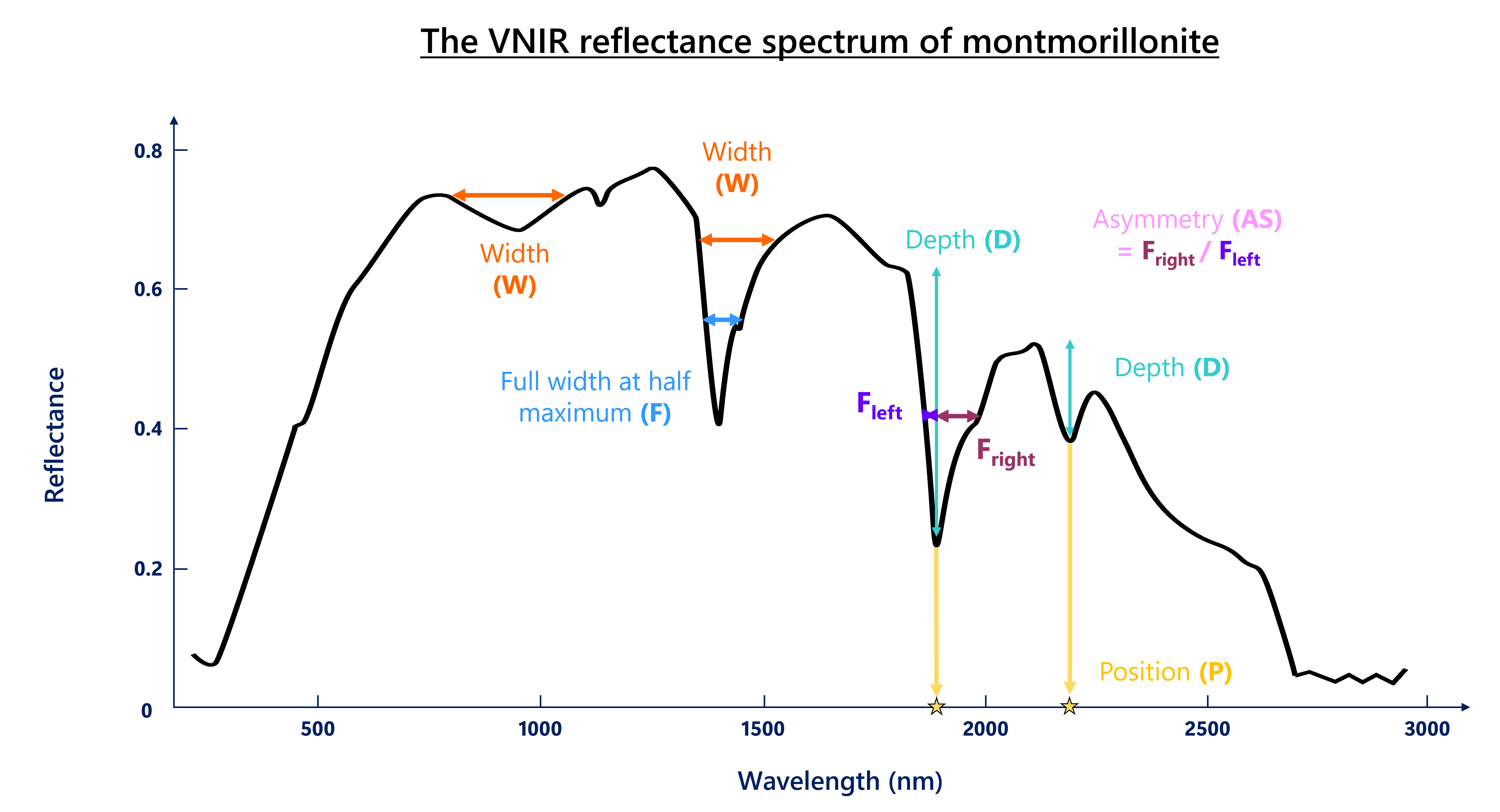
An illustration of geometrical parameters in the visible-near Infrared (VNIR) reflectance spectrum of montmorillonite, a clay mineral. Modified from Clark et al., 2007. The analysis of absorption features in a reflectance spectrum typically looks into the position (P), depth (D), and width (W) of absorption bands across a certain wavelength interval. The full width at half maximum (F) and asymmetry (AS) of shape with respect to the absorption bands are also commonly evaluated. Together, these elements combine to build spectral indices in order to characterize and parameterize specific minerals.

- Position (P): The position of absorption band at a certain wavelength interval.
- Depth (D): The depth of absorption band (absorption value) at a certain wavelength interval.
- Width (W): The width of absorption band at a certain wavelength interval.
- Full width at half maximum (F): The width of an imaginary horizontal line positioned at half of the maximum absorption strength of a particular absorption band.
- Asymmetry (AS): The asymmetry of shape with respect to an absorption band. It can be quantified by the ratio between left and right widths with respect to the half maximum. Hence, an AS value of 1.0 will represent a symmetrical absorption band, while AS < 1.0 and AS > 1.0 will indicate leftward and rightward asymmetry.

The investigation of spectral features is often followed by building spectral indices to characterize specific minerals, i.e., parameterizing. The indices are based on the unique spectral properties exhibited by the materials, such as the positions and depths of absorption bands. A similar example of such indices is the Normalized difference vegetation index (NDVI).

=== Mineral identification ===
Minerals are identified with spectroradiometry by examining their spectral response to incoming radiation, such as brightness and reflectance, across different wavelengths. In particular, absorption bands observed in the reflectance spectra can be unique towards different minerals which allow the differentiation between one another. These absorption features arise from the distinct electronic and vibrational processes associated with the energy, molecular components, and internal structures of minerals. Electronic processes of minerals comprise charge transfers, crystal field effects (electrons achieving higher energy states), conduction bands, and colour centres, whereas vibrational processes in minerals involve stretching, bending, and rotation, which are influenced by the functional groups present in the minerals.

For example, water-bearing minerals commonly share distinctive absorption features indicating the presence of hydroxyl groups (-OH) and molecular water (H_{2}O), which include the asymmetrical absorption features due to overtones near 1400 nm (AS_{1400}), as well as absorption peaks near 1900 (D_{1900}) and 2200 nm (D_{2200}). With higher molecular water contents, the AS_{1400} feature becomes more asymmetrical, the absorption near 2200 nm strengthens, but the one near 1900 nm weakens. Hence, the asymmetrical absorption feature (AS_{1400}), together with the ratio between absorption depths near 2200 and 1900 nm (D_{2200}/D_{1900}) are used a parameter to quantify water contents.

In practice, however, certain minerals may exhibit absorption features that coincide with those of water in similar wavelength intervals. This can potentially lead to the overlapping or masking of absorption features associated with the original minerals. Such situations may arise during field scanning or when dealing with wet samples, introducing confusion in mineral identification. Therefore, to minimize such interference, drying of samples prior to spectral scanning for mineral identification is essential. The drying process should be conducted at a temperature of 105 °C or below, which can ensure the removal of adsorbed water without causing any disruption to the internal structures of minerals.

Considering the identification capabilities of spectroradiometry for different minerals and rocks, the comprehensive databases that encompass spectral signatures are crucial. Such databases serve as resources which contributes to advancing our understanding and characterization of Earth materials. The United States Geological Survey (USGS) spectral library and the ECOSTRESS spectral library represent present examples of such databases. The USGS spectral library provides a collection of reflectance spectra for rock-forming minerals and other Earth materials, spanning from ultraviolet (350 nm) to shortwave infrared (SWIR) regions (2500 nm). Likewise, the ECOSTRESS spectral library integrates spectral data from multiple spectral libraries, consolidating information on minerals and rocks into a standardized data format.

== Geomorphology and surface mapping ==
Geomorphology is the study of geological processes occurring at the surface of Earth that subsequently shape different kinds of landforms. Surface mapping is a common approach to understand these processes and their effects, which can be done by using spectroradiometry. Chemical weathering is one of the dominant processes controlling the morphology of Earth's surface, which produces iron oxides as coatings on particle surfaces, as well as clay minerals that evolve from hydrothermal alteration and decomposition of feldspars in surface soils and granitic rock bodies. These minerals are sensitive to spectral parameters like brightness and reflectance, and they exhibit distinctive absorption features on reflectance spectra, which facilitates easy diagnosis and determination of weathering states.

=== Clay minerals (Phyllosilicates) ===
Sources:

- Illite: Narrow absorption peaks at 1400, 1900, 2200, and 2300 nm.
- Chlorite: Triple absorption features near 2300 nm.
- Vermiculite: Pairs of narrow absorption peaks situated at 1400 and 1900 nm; weak absorption features present near 2200 and 2300 nm.
- Smectite: Strong and sharp absorption features at 1400, 1900, and 2200 nm; The peaks at 1400 and 1900 nm comes with weak absorption features attached to their right sides.
- Kaolinite: Doublet absorption peaks near 1400 and 2200 nm.

The genesis of clay minerals occurs in a progressive sequence, starting with illite and chlorite, then vermiculite, smectite, and finally forming kaolinite. Kaolinite, being the ultimate product of clay minerals, represents the most advanced stage of weathering.

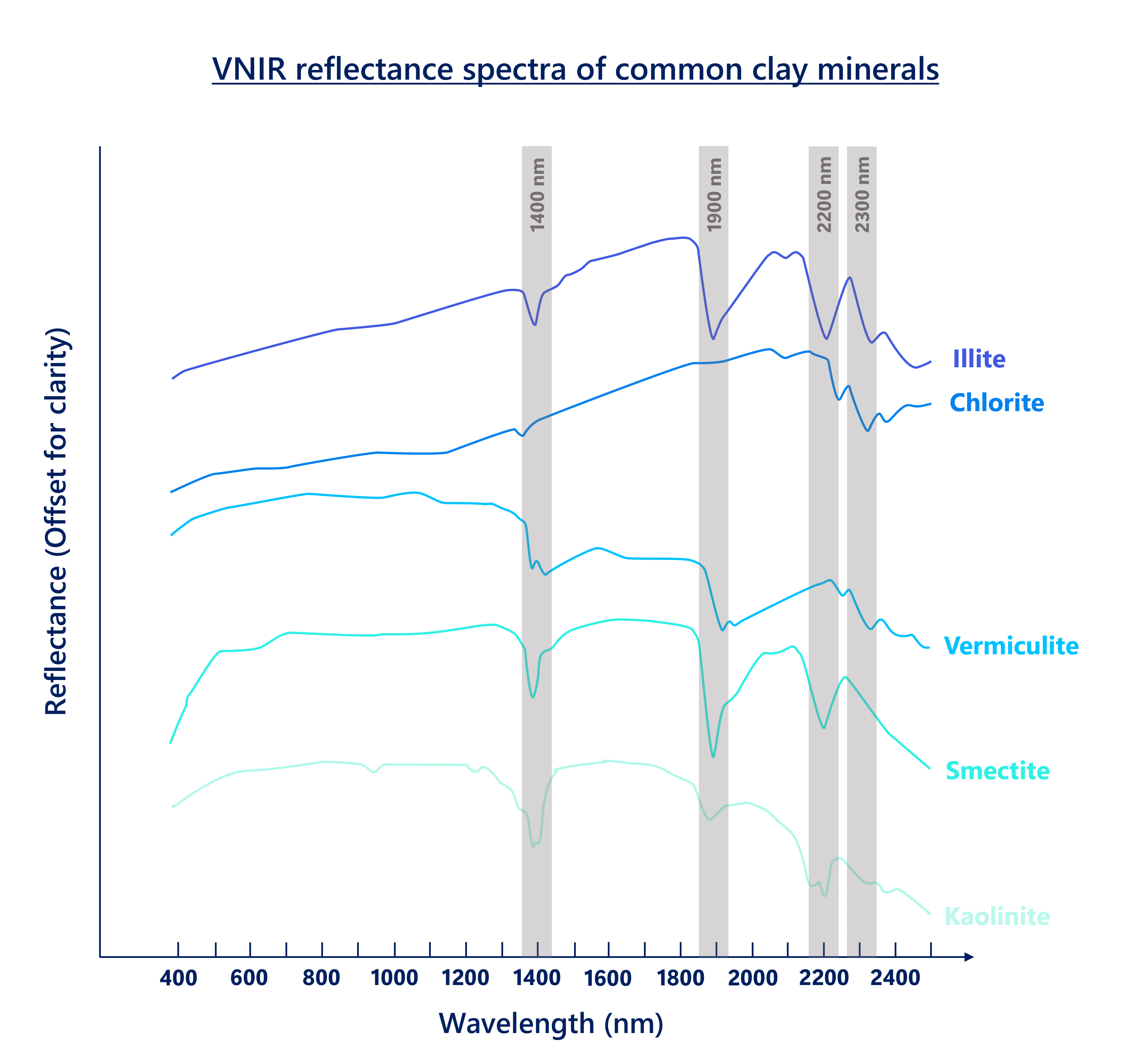
The reflectance spectra of common clay minerals (phyllosilicates) in the visible and near infrared (VNIR) region, modified from Clark et al., 2007. The values of reflectance as shown in the figure were offset to allow for clear comparison of spectral features among the minerals. Diagnostic absorption peaks exhibited by different clay minerals are observed along 1400, 1900, 2200, and 2300 nm, which can be used to distinguish from one another.

=== Iron oxides ===
Sources:

- Hematite: Broad absorption features near 500 and 920 nm.
- Goethite: Broad absorption features near 500, 700, and 920 nm.

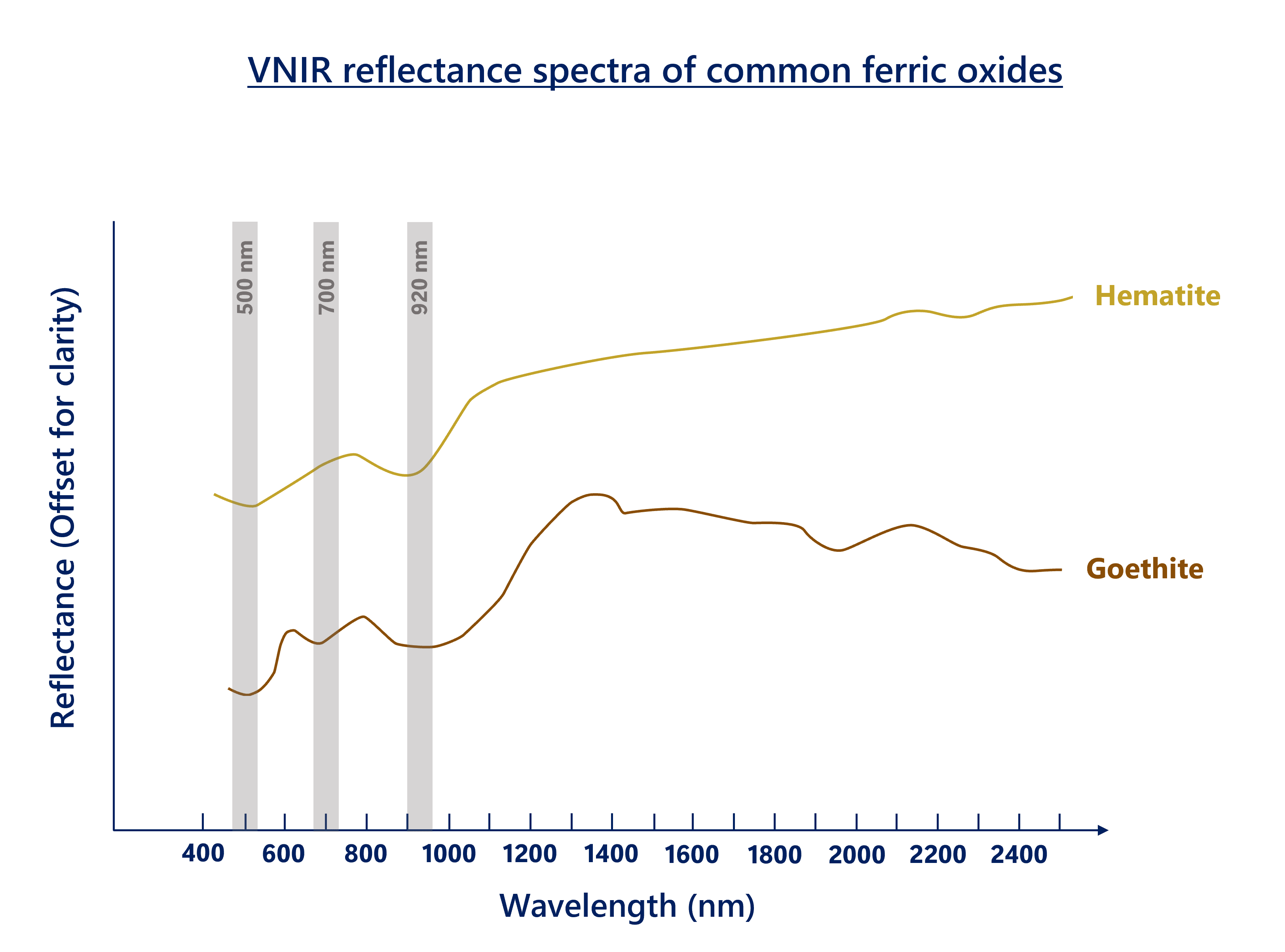
The reflectance spectra of common iron oxides in the visible and near infrared (VNIR) region, modified from Clark et al., 2007. The values of reflectance as shown in the figure were offset to facilitate comparison of spectral features among the two minerals. Diagnostic absorption peaks exhibited by hematite and goethite are observed along 500, 700, and 920 nm, which can be used to distinguish from one another.

Based on the above, three groups of distinctive spectral parameters are distinguished which can serve as the indicators of weathering states.

The first group of parameters deals with the absorption features at 500, 700, and 920 nm due to ferric iron components. The peaks positioned at 920 nm (P_{920}), and the ratio between absorption depths near 500 and 700 nm (D_{700}/D_{500}) are inversely proportional to the concentration of hematite, thus smaller values will mean higher degree of weathering.

The second group of parameters is related to hydroxyl group (-OH) and water (H_{2}O). Stronger absorption absorption features near 1400 nm (AS_{1400}), and larger ratio between absorptions near 2200 and 1900 nm (D_{2200}/D_{1900}), reflect higher molecular water contents, hence more alteration and weathering.

The third group of parameters concerns the effects of absorption contributed by Al-OH bonds in clay minerals including illite and kaolinite, which is situated near 2200 nm. These absorption bands become more asymmetric (AS_{2200} > 1, showing leftward asymmetry) with increasing kaolinite contents as a result of transformation from illite, implying greater extents of mineral alteration, degree of hydrolysis, and silicate decomposition, which serves as signals that indicate more advanced weathering stages.

Determining the above spectral parameters will enable the quantification of weathering rates, thus providing implications to paleoclimatic conditions. The application of spectroradiometry in geomorphological studies brings opportunities into rapid mapping of weathered outcrops and the study of weathering kinetics and paleoclimate particularly in remote and inaccessible regions.

== Geochronology ==
Geochronology is the study of age and timing of geological events that have occurred throughout Earth's history. Many different geochronological methods have been developed, using various Earth materials and geological processes as proxies. Among these methods, spectroradiometry has recently emerged as a valuable tool in dating techniques, particularly in tephrochronology and surface dating applications.

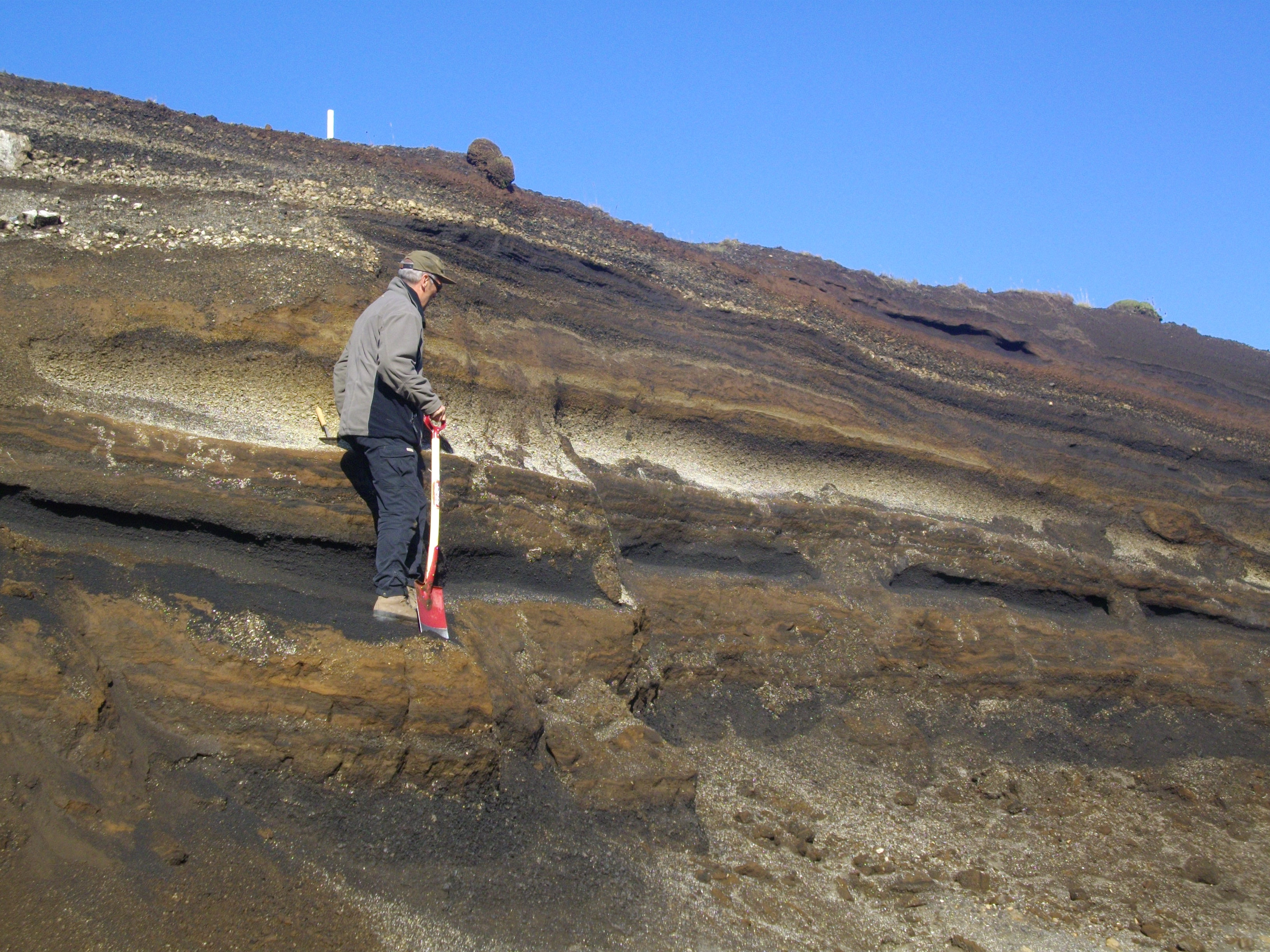
Tephra horizons as shown in an outcrop at Iceland. Tephra stands out from background sediments with its high albedo and reflectance values, which can be detected using spectroradiometry. Spectroradiometry is particularly useful in identifying tephra layers when the colour and appearance of sediments look similar, and when the tephra layers are heavily mixed with background sediments. For instance, only one tephra layer is observed in the outcrop shown in the figure. There might be more tephra layers hidden within the strata that could be detected only by using a spectroradiometer.

=== Tephrochronology ===
Tephrochronology refers to the age determination of sedimentary strata using tephra, i.e., volcanic ashes and fragments. They serve as viable chronological markers and are precisely dated due to their instantaneous deposition over wide regions. The ashes typically have a high purity, composed of silicates (such as quartz), and phyllosilicates (such as kaolinite, serpentine), which are highly sensitive towards spectral parameters such that they demonstrate characteristic spectral features when compared to the background sediments. Volcanic ashes with a high silica content, known as felsic ashes, stand out from the background sediments due to their high albedo and reflectance values. In contrast, mafic ashes, which have low silica content, exhibit lower reflectance due to their purity compared to the mixed compositions of the background sediments. Additionally, phyllosilicate minerals in volcanic ashes display strong absorption features near 2200 nm, attributed to the stretching of hydroxyl groups (-OH bonds) with aluminium. Consequently, these spectral signatures enable the detection and differentiation of volcanic ashes from other sediments. Imaging spectroradiometry can be used for regional-scale mapping of volcanic ash deposits, as well as core logging. Meanwhile, non-imaging spectroradiometry, combined with field scanning and sampling, is suitable for localized applications, providing age implications and constraints for stratigraphic units.

=== Surface dating ===
Surface dating is the measurement of relative age of sediment deposits on the Earth's surface. This can be achieved by utilizing weathering states as proxies, based on the principle that sediments with a higher degree of weathering have been exposed for a longer period of time. The intensity of weathering is highly correlated to the concentration of secondary iron oxides and clay minerals present in the sediments. These can be identified and measured through specific absorption features near 1400, 1900, and 2200 nm, thus establishing a relationship between age and reflectance. Using multi-, hyperspectral, and thermal imaging, the ages of surfaces of regional sediment deposits, such as alluvial fans, can be predicted and mapped.

Together, spectroradiometry provides a new approach in estimating sediment ages, as a supplement to conventional geochemical analysis. The advancement of this technique has the potential to expand surface age models to encompass remote regions, enhancing the understanding of regional geological history.

== Earth resources ==
Earth resources are natural materials and substances that can be extracted from the Earth and used by humans for numerous purposes. Typical examples include minerals and fossil fuels. Spectroradiometry, with its ability to identify Earth materials through capturing their distinctive spectral signals, holds significant potential in exploring and predicting the presence of ore deposits and hydrocarbon reservoirs. Importantly, its applicability to inaccessible areas further expands its utility in assessing and investigating Earth's valuable resources.

=== Ore exploration ===
Spectroradiometry is widely utilized for the identification and prediction of ore deposits associated with hydrothermal systems. Hydrothermally altered deposits, known as epigenetic deposits, undergo multiple episodes of chemical alteration caused by interactions between hydrothermal fluids and the surrounding rock formations. These alteration processes are often related to volcanic and geothermal activities, where hot hydrothermal fluids penetrate through fractures in pre-existing country rocks, resulting in the deposition of valuable metallic ores such as gold and copper. Clay minerals are commonly formed as alteration products in these deposits, and their presence can be detected using spectroradiometry. Illite, for instance, is commonly observed in the vicinity of hydrothermal ore bodies. Higher concentrations of illite may indicate areas conducive to ore precipitation, and the spectral characteristics of illite, including strong absorption features near 1400, 1900, and 2200 nm (D_{1400}, D_{1900}, D_{2200}) in the wavelength spectra, can be utilized to identify and trace ore fluid pathways and deposition.

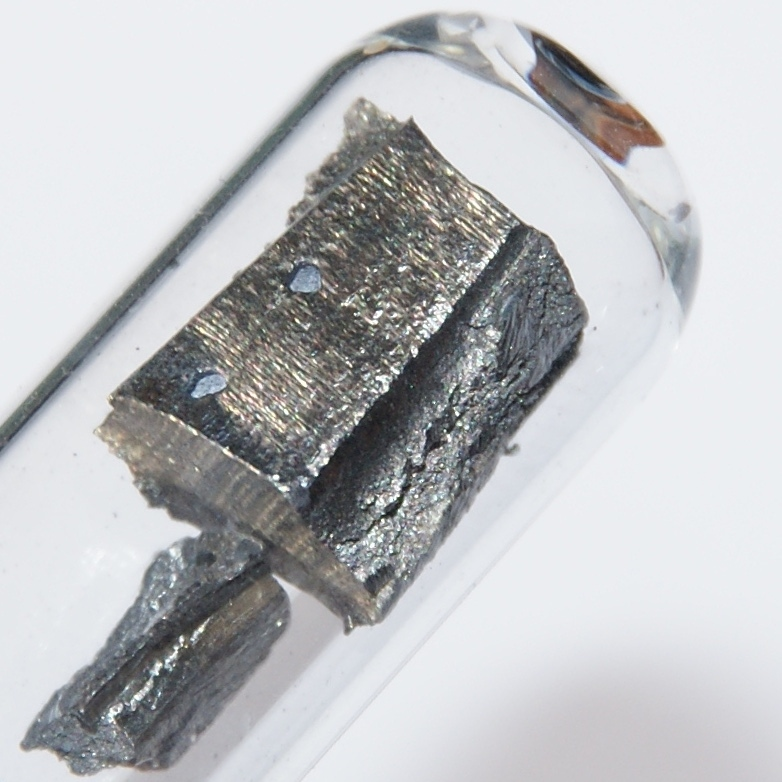
A sample of Neodymium, commonly found in Regolith-hosted rare earth element deposits. It holds substantial economic value. Notably, neodymium exhibits unique spectral characteristics that make it highly traceable using spectroradiometry.

Regolith-hosted rare earth element (REE) deposits can also be identified and located using spectroradiometry. These deposits are conventionally situated in highly decomposed granitic rock bodies. The intense weathering processes occurring in granitic rocks give rise to the denudation and leaching of major element oxides, leaving behind the highly decomposed regolith. Throughout the weathering process, clay minerals such as kaolinite and halloysite are generated as alteration products, which possess a strong affinity for adsorbing REEs, leading to their enrichment in the regolith. One specific REE of interest is neodymium (Nd), which has extensive applications in the industry. Nd exhibits distinctive spectral features in reflectance spectroscopy that can be used for its detection and identification, centred near 740, 800, and 865 nm (D_{740}, D_{800}, D_{865}) in the wavelength spectra. Making use of these spectral characteristics, combined with geochemical interpretations and machine learning, the identification and mapping of Nd-enriched regolith areas can be fostered, which may provide implications towards potential REE mineralization and respective ore bodies.

=== Hydrocarbon exploration ===
Most hydrocarbon reservoirs are situated deep underground, but their presence can be inferred from surface manifestations including micro-seepages. Micro-seepage occurs when hydrocarbon compounds, such as oil and gas, are released from small fractures and fissures, either directly to the ground surface, or indirectly through the impacts of volatile hydrocarbons on plants and vegetation. While micro-seepages are often not visually discernible, they can be detected using hyperspectral imaging and reflectance spectroscopy. Similarly, the same approach can be used towards the identification of coal reservoirs through their associated coal-bearing rocks, based on the unique spectral imprints given by hydrocarbons, which spans the infrared wavelength regions. Some of the signature spectral features of hydrocarbon molecules are as follows:

- OH and CH bonds: Absorption features near 1400 nm.
- Aromatic groups: Absorption features near 3280, 5250, 6200, 11000, 14000 nm.
- Aliphatic groups: Broad absorption features between 1600 – 1800 nm, 2300 – 2350 nm, and 3400 – 3500 nm, accompanied by another absorption near 6800 nm.
- Moisture contents: Absorption features near 1900 and 2940 nm.

With spectroradiometry, the spectral properties related to hydrocarbons can be easily detected and analyzed, thereby facilitating the mapping and exploration of such energy resources.

== Planetary geology ==
The study of planetary geology looks into the geology of planets aside from Earth, as well as moons, asteroids, and other celestial bodies. Terrestrial planets have gained popularity among modern scientific research, since they offer insights into the evolution of planets and have demonstrated the potential for extraterrestrial life in the Solar System. Spectroradiometry, with its ability to characterize surficial compositions and study the geology of these celestial bodies, is considered a key technique in planetary science.

In recent years, huge efforts are devoted to the exploration of Mars, especially on its geology, which helps unravelling the planet's evolutionary history, understanding past and ongoing events occurring on the planet, and providing insights towards its habitability for human exploration.

=== Mars ===
Minerals on Mars are largely mafic, accompanied by substantial amount of clays. Each of these minerals are found in different regions on Mars, and are detected by spectroradiometers through their characteristic absorption features on the reflectance spectra.

==== Ices ====
Ices composed of water and carbon dioxide are typically found in the northern and southern permanent polar caps on Mars. They also exist as seasonal frosts and clouds.

- Crystalline H_{2}O ice: Broad absorption features near 1500 nm.
- CO_{2} ice: Narrow absorption features near 1435 nm, with minor absorption peaks near 2280 nm.

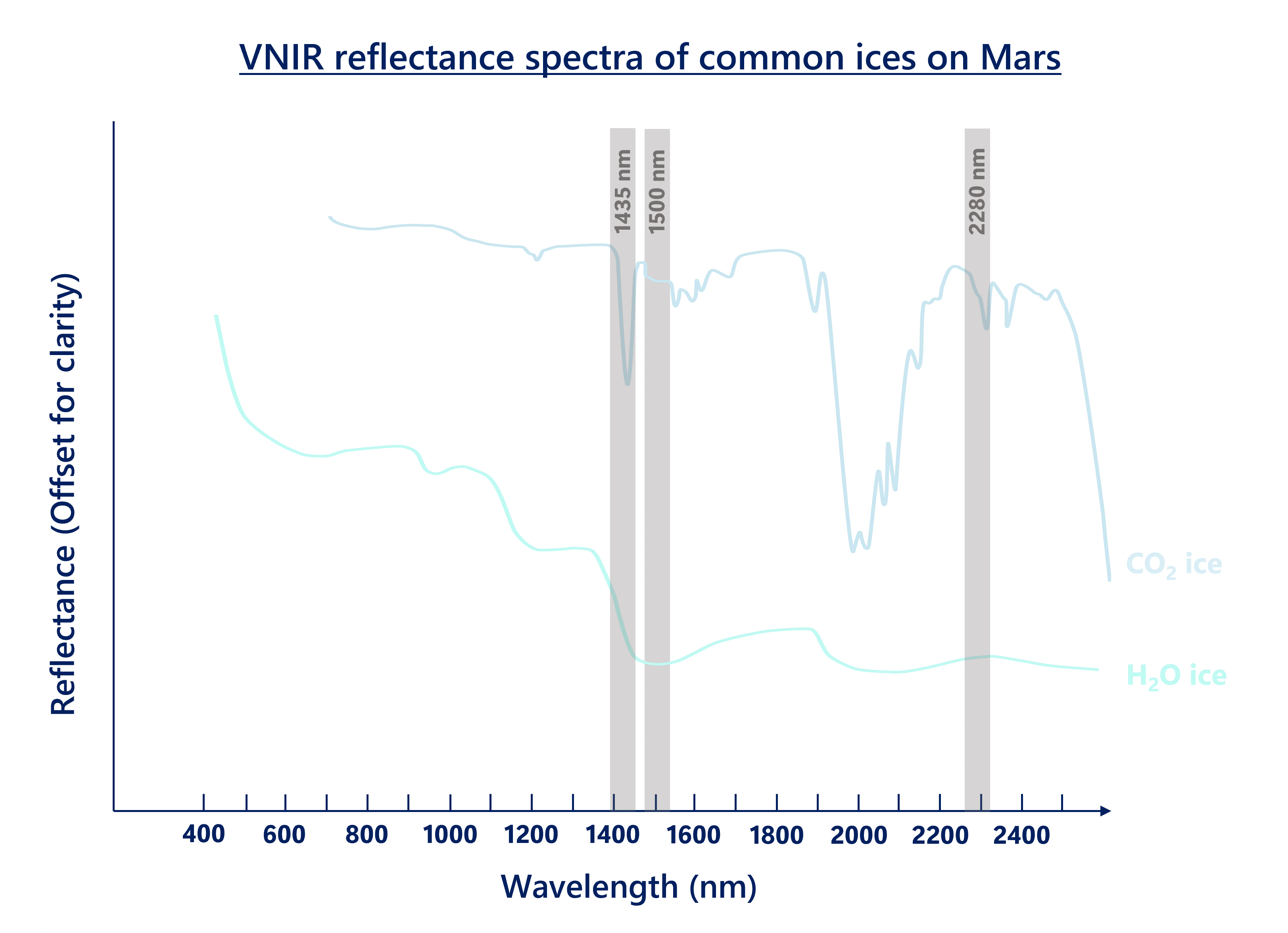
The visible and near infrared (VNIR) reflectance spectra of common ices on Mars, modified from Viviano et al., 2014. The values of reflectance as shown in the figure were offset to facilitate comparison of spectral features among the two ices. Diagnostic absorption peaks exhibited by crystalline H_{2}O and CO_{2} ices are observed along 1435, 1500, and 2280 nm.

==== Mafic silicates ====
Sources:

- Olivine: Broad absorption features centred near 1000 nm. The features get deeper and wider with increasing iron contents.
- Pyroxene: Broad absorption features near 1000 and 2000 nm. Most pyroxenes in Mars are calcium depleted (dunite, pyroxenite) which slightly shifts the absorption features towards shorter wavelengths.
- Plagioclase: Broad absorption features centred near 1300 nm given that there is substitution of iron and calcium ions.

The mafic silicates made up the composition of basaltic crusts on Mars. At Martian valleys and craters, such minerals are often seen associated with hydrated silica deposits resulted from alteration.

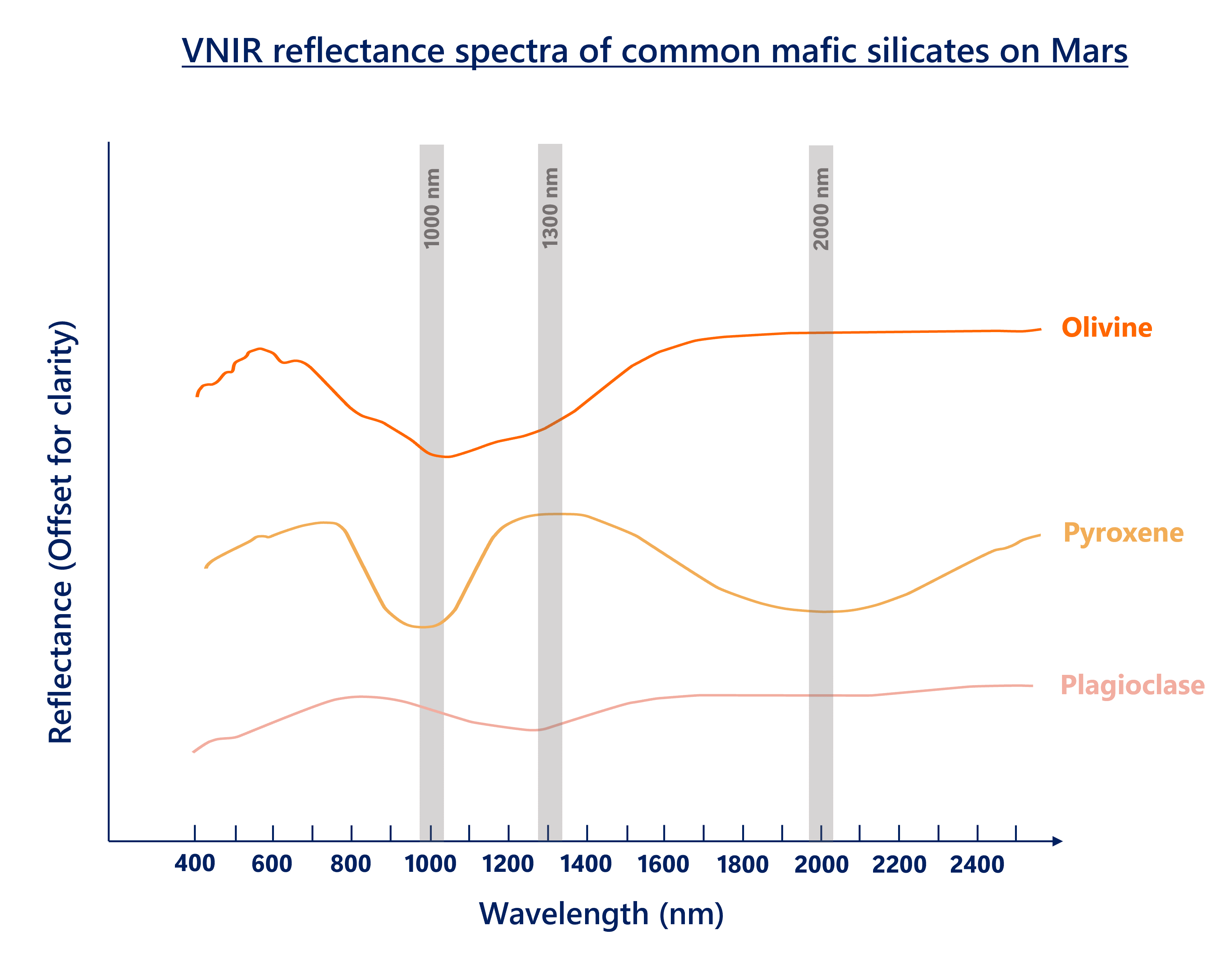
The visible and near infrared (VNIR) reflectance spectra of common mafic silicates on Mars, modified from Viviano et al., 2014. The values of reflectance as shown in the figure were offset to facilitate comparison of spectral features among the three minerals. Diagnostic absorption peaks exhibited by olivine, pyroxene, and plagioclase are observed along 1100, 1300, and 2000 nm.

==== Iron oxides ====
Iron oxides (mostly hematite) are involved in the compositions of most surface soils and dust on Mars, providing implications to Martian surficial processes.

- Hematite: Broad absorption features near 500 and 920 nm.

==== Clay minerals (Phyllosilicates) ====
Iron- and magnesium-bearing clay minerals have widespread compositions on Mars. Typical examples are as follows:

- Talc: Narrow absorption features at 1400 nm, strong absorption bands near 2310 and 2390 nm.
- Prehnite: Absorption features near 1480 and 2350 nm.
- Serpentine: Broad absorption peaks centred near 1390, 2320, and 2510 nm, with a weak absorption band near 2100 nm.

Aluminium-bearing clays are also found on Mars. Their spectral characteristics are mentioned in the previous sections.

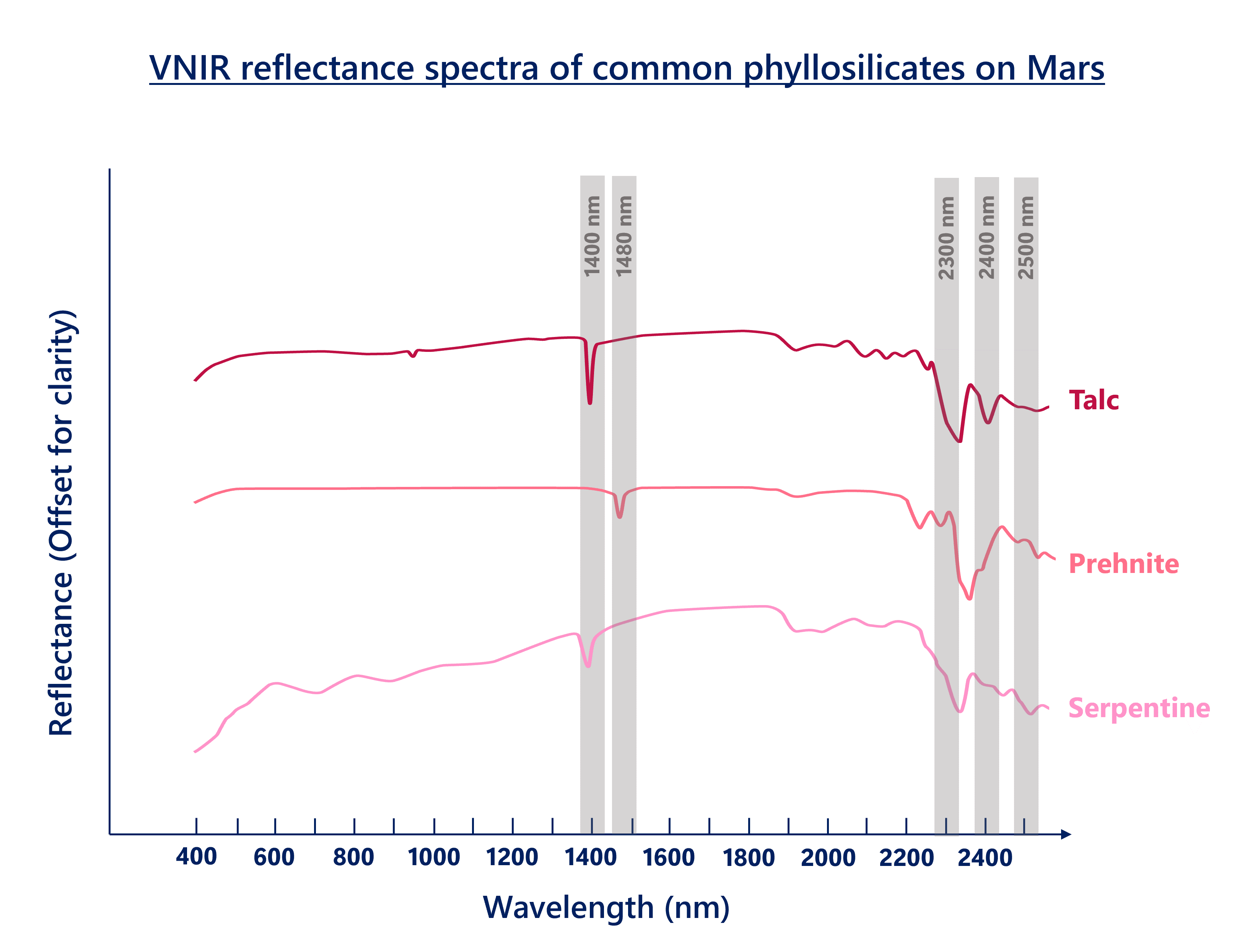
The visible and near infrared (VNIR) reflectance spectra of common ices on Mars, modified from Viviano et al., 2014. The values of reflectance as shown in the figure were offset to facilitate comparison of spectral features among the three minerals. Diagnostic absorption peaks exhibited by talc, prehnite, and serpentine are observed along 1400 to 1500, and 2300 to 2500 nm.

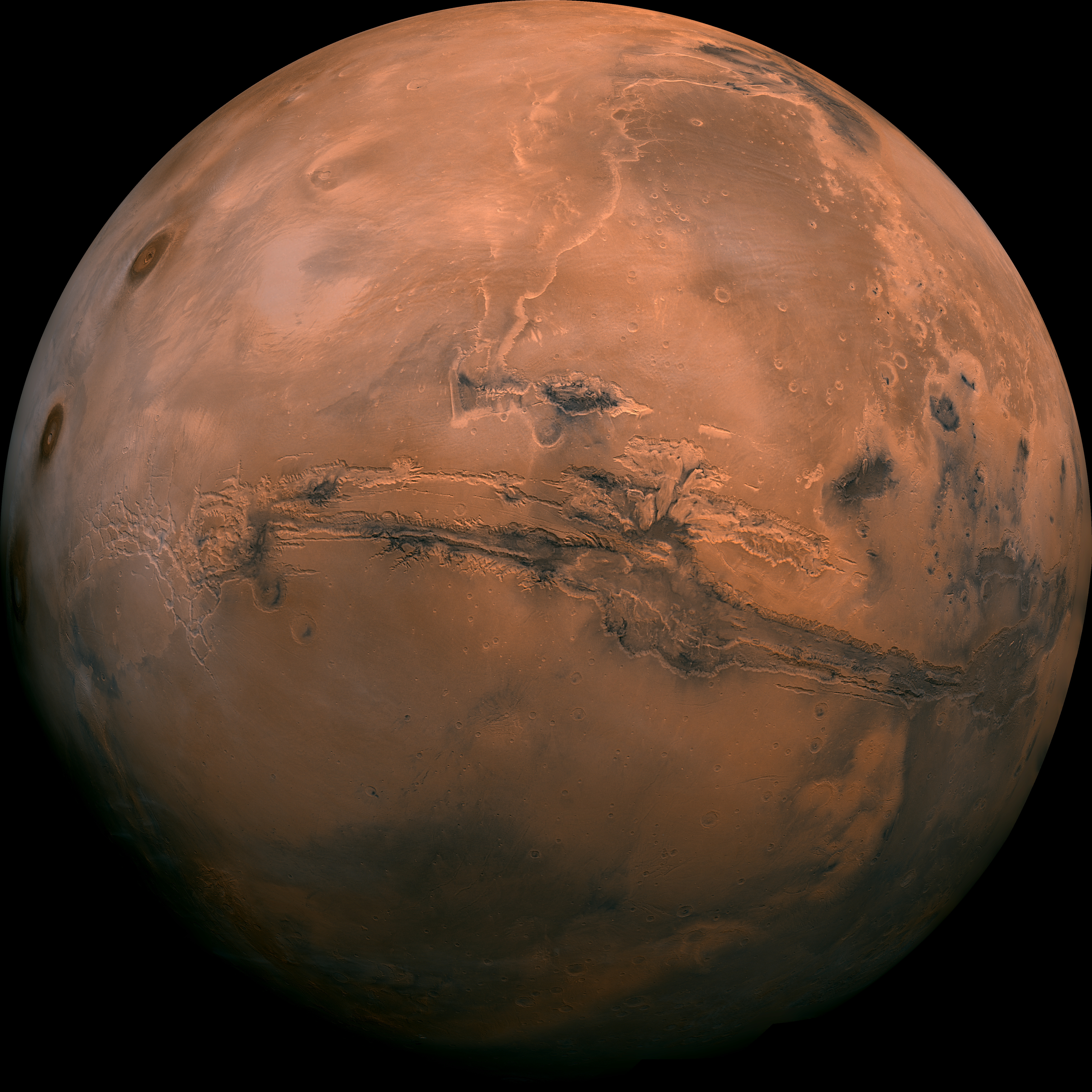
Valles Marineris, a snapshot taken by the Viking 1 probe. Polyhydrated sulphates are abundant along this area.

==== Sulphates ====
Sulphates on Mars are polyhydrated. They are scattered along the western hemisphere, equatorial and northern part of Mars, at Valles Marineris, Meridiani Planum, and Arabia. Examples of Martian sulphates include gypsum, bassanite, kieserite, jarosite, and alunite.

- Polyhydrated sulphates: Absorption features near 1400, 1900, and 2400 nm.

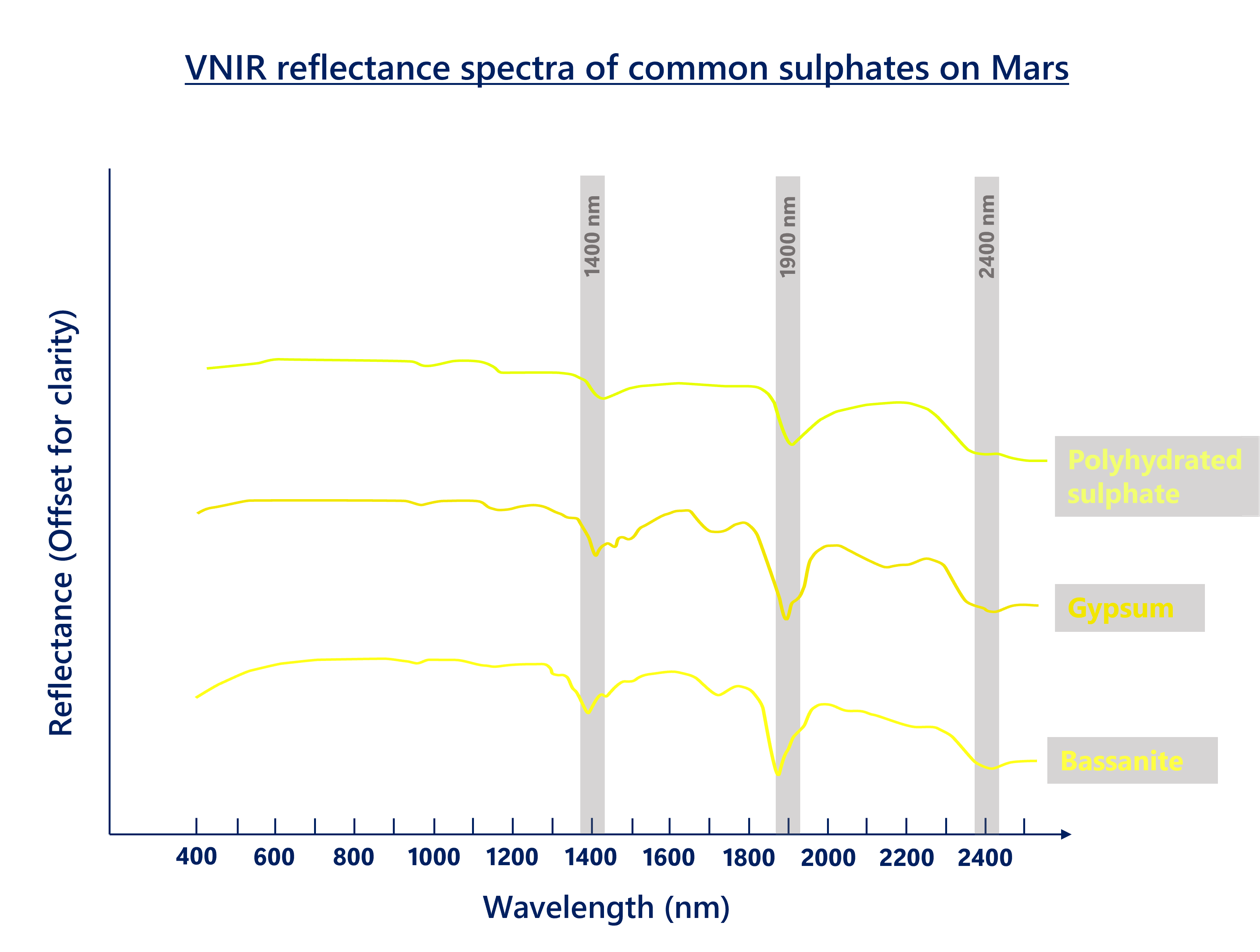
The visible and near infrared (VNIR) reflectance spectra of common sulphates on Mars, modified from Viviano et al., 2014. The values of reflectance as shown in the figure were offset to facilitate comparison of spectral features among the three minerals. Diagnostic absorption peaks exhibited by polyhydrated sulphates, including gypsum and bassanite, are observed along 1400, 1900, and 2400 nm.

==== Zeolites ====
Zeolites are identified in craters near Martian basins and highlands, providing implications towards the environments on Mars. The most distinctive zeolite mineral discovered on Mars is analcime.

- Analcime: Strong absorption features near 1790 and 2500 nm.

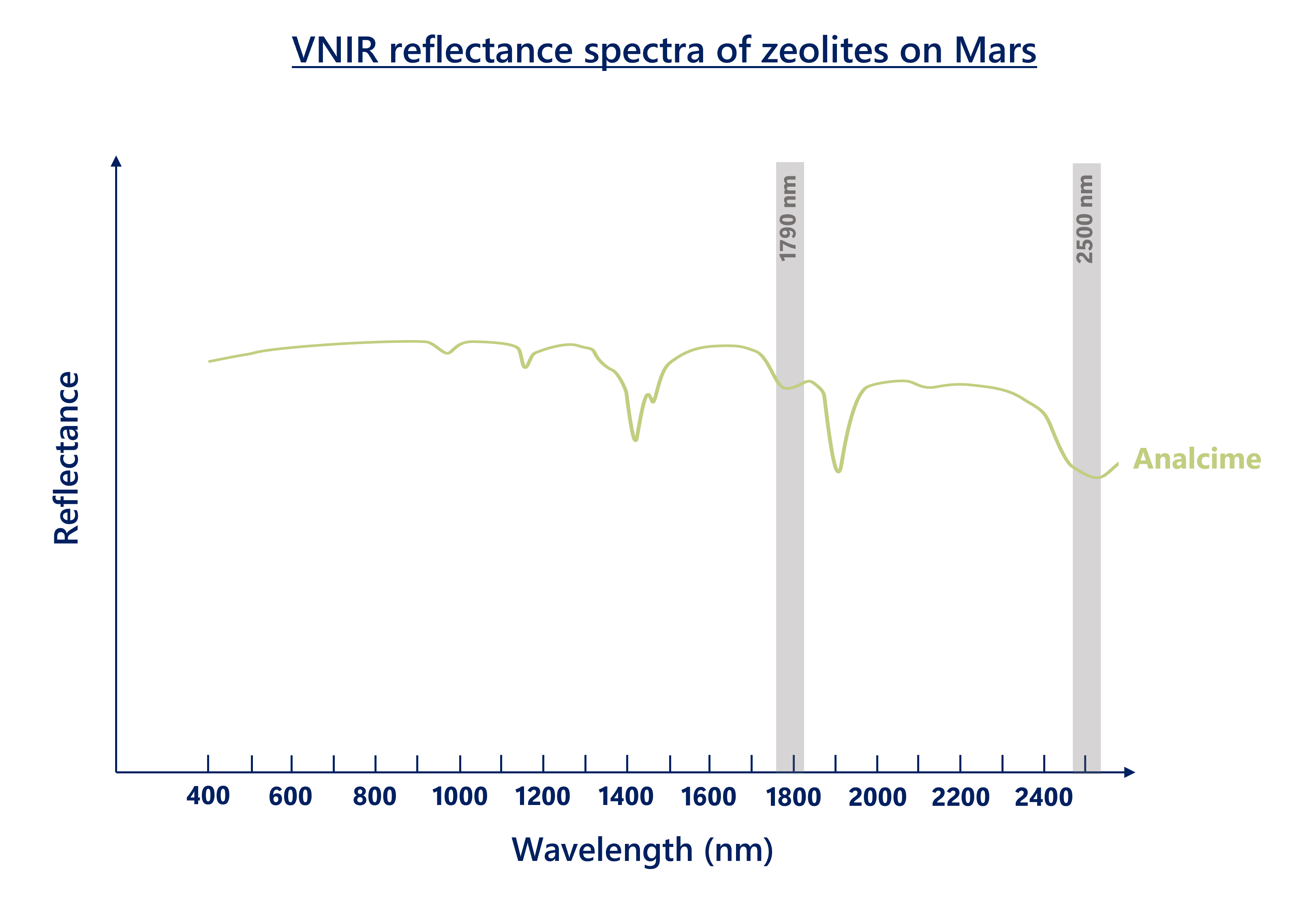
The visible and near infrared (VNIR) reflectance spectra of common ices on Mars, modified from Viviano et al., 2014. Diagnostic absorption peaks exhibited by analcime are observed along 1790 and 2500 nm.

==== Carbonates ====
Carbonates on Mars can be iron- or magnesium-rich. Characterized by their paired absorption features near 2300 and 2500 nm, they are found along Nili Fossae, and Tyrrhena Terra located at the southern Martian highlands.

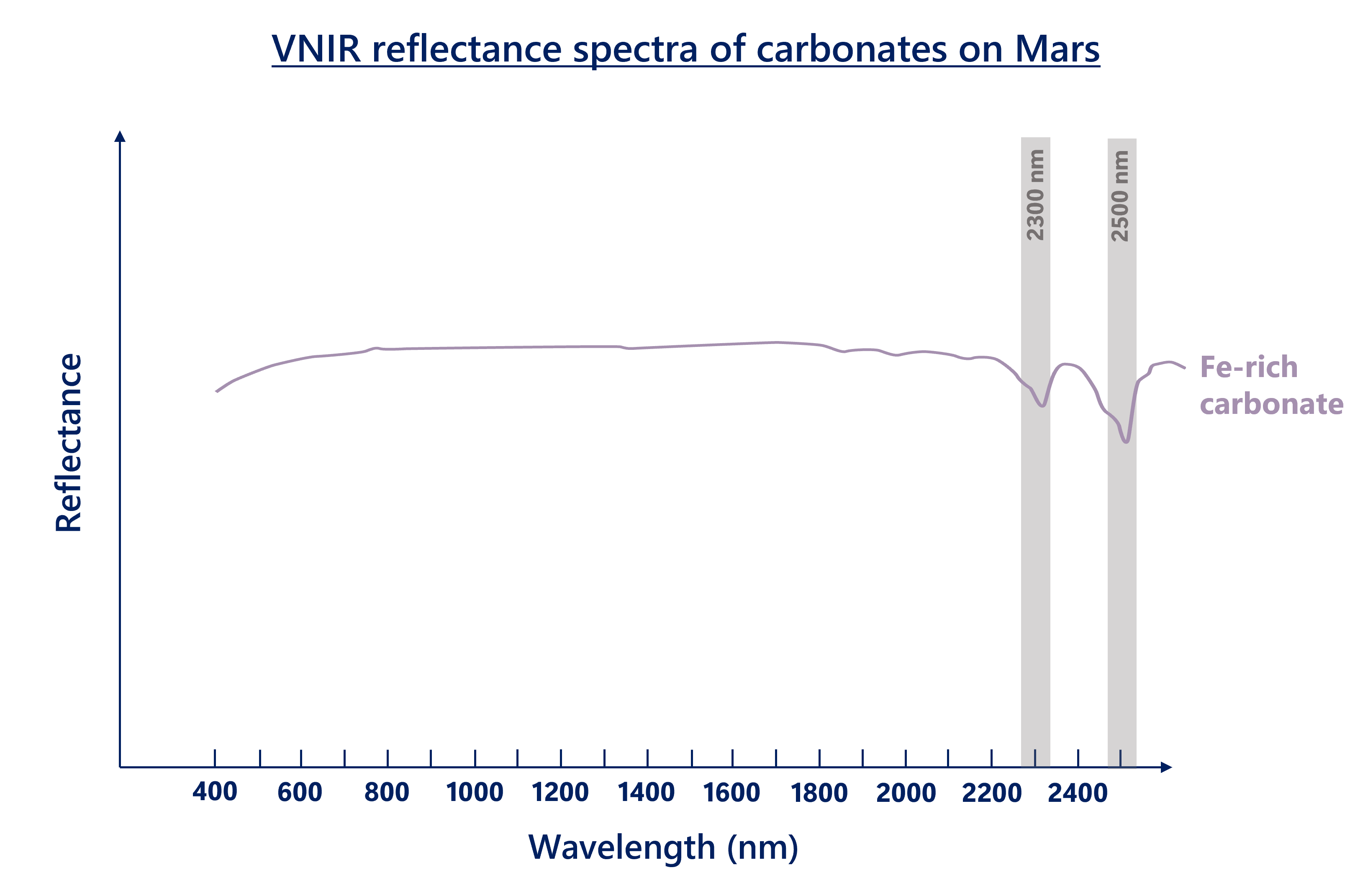
The visible and near infrared (VNIR) reflectance spectra of common ices on Mars, modified from Viviano et al., 2014. Diagnostic absorption peaks exhibited by iron-rich carbonates are observed along 2300 and 2500 nm.

The identification of mineral compositions on Mars offers vital clues towards Martian geological processes from the past to the present. In particular, the presence of clay minerals serves as the direct evidence of basaltic weathering on Mars. The analysis of compositional stratigraphy provided by Martian rock samples has revealed strengthening absorption features near 1400 and 1900 nm (D_{1400} and D_{1900}). These features are diagnostic of elevated hydroxyl (-OH) contents owing to the increasing abundance of kaolinite, in replacement of other clay minerals. This reflects the increasing of weathering intensity and the occurrence of aqueous processes on Martian crust, indicating that a wet and warm climate had once existed on the planet.

Importantly, the occurrence of intensive chemical weathering on ancient Mars proves the past existence of water. Other than iron oxides and clays, previously detected sulphates, carbonates, and zeolites also serve as the proxies of water. Sulphates commonly form as a result of the alteration of crustal materials by groundwater and rain, and the precipitation of evaporated water bodies. Carbonates are originated from interactions between water and basalts in a CO_{2}-rich environment, whereas zeolites are formed in alkaline waters and hydrothermal environments. The presence of these minerals altogether account for the evidence for the past occurrence of water on Mars. They also imply possibility of the planet having supported life at some point.

== Spectroradiometers ==
Spectroradiometers are primarily used as remote sensors in spectroradiometry to detect and quantify light intensity and its associated parameters (e.g. wavelength, amplitude). Spectral reflectance and transmittance data are digitally recorded which facilitates spectral analysis.

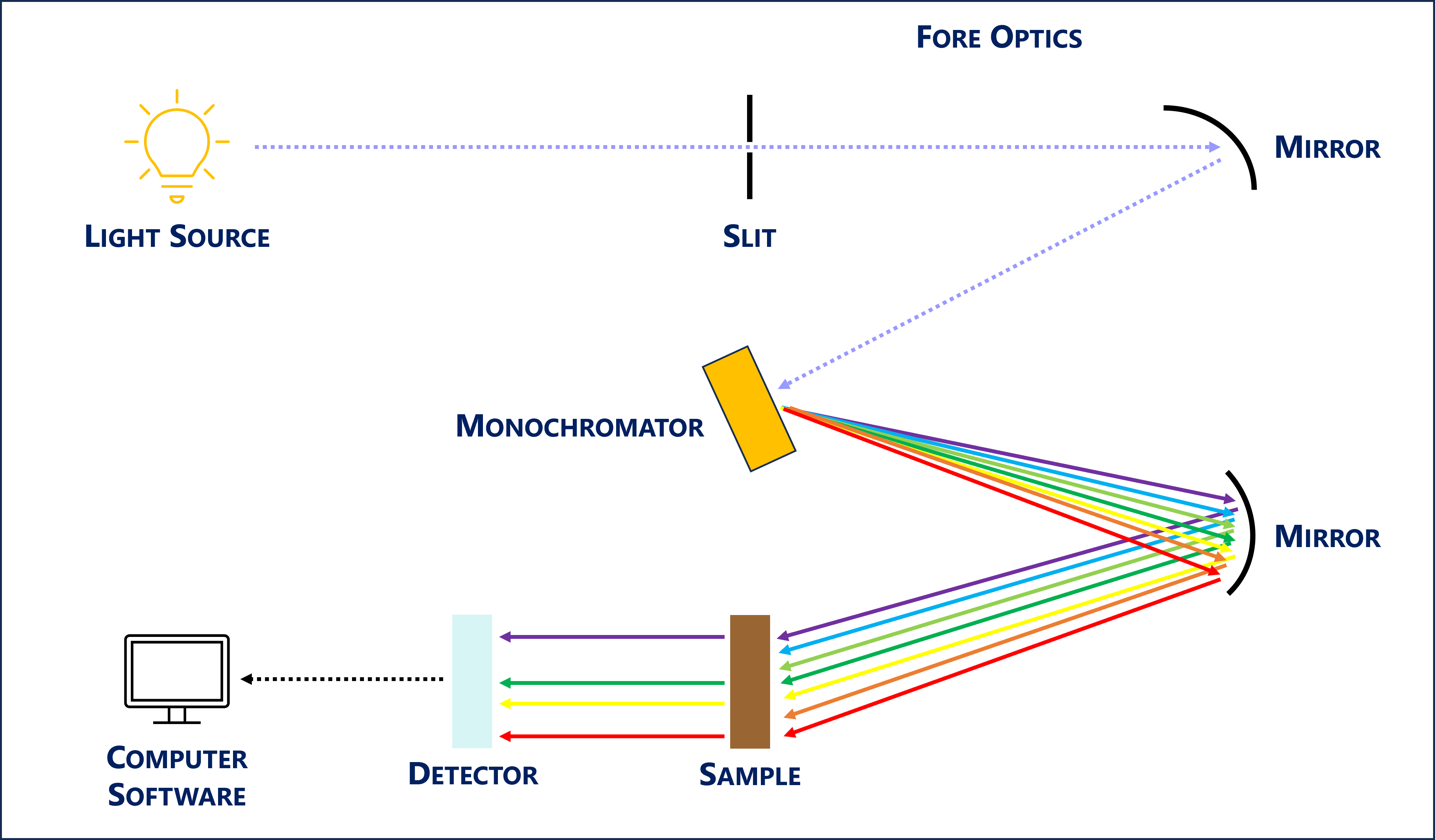
A schematic diagram showing the basic components of a spectroradiometer and how it works. The spectroradiometer first captures light from the target substance being measured. The components of fore optics such as optical lenses, diffusers, filters, and slits ensure the source radiation is delivered onto the detectors appropriately and efficiently. The collected light then passes through a monochromator, where it is separated into different ranges of wavelengths to create a spectrum. The separated wavelengths of light are subsequently directed onto a detector, such as a charge-coupled device (CCD) array or a CMOS sensor, where the radiation intensities across the spectrum are recorded. The measurements of the detector is finally converted into a digital format to obtain the spectral data through computer software.

The monochromator, as a standard component of a spectroradiometer, is key to create a wide spectrum that exhibits the spectral properties of substances. It utilizes a dispersive element, such as a prism or diffraction grating, to split light radiation collected from substances into different ranges of wavelengths.

=== Components ===
- Fore optics: Optical lenses, diffusers, filters, and slits. These components modify the source radiation to ensure that it can be delivered to the detectors appropriately and efficiently. A calibration unit is often attached to maintain data accuracy.
- Monochromator: Captures and splits incoming radiation (polychromatic light) into ranges of different wavelengths (monochromatic light) to foster spectral analysis.
- Detector: Detects and records spectra of electromagnetic radiation. Different detectors may be used depending on the wavelength intervals to be measured. Examples include charge-coupled device (CCD) arrays and CMOS sensors.

Imaging spectroradiometers generate digital imagery that captures spectral parameters with spatial variation, meaning that they record variations in spectral properties within the spectroradiometer's field of view. These instruments are typically larger in sizes and are situated far away from the targeted areas of measurement, such that can be found in spaceborne platforms, such as satellites, or airborne platforms, including aircraft and drones. In contrast, non-imaging spectroradiometers capture the spectral properties of the entire field of view without spatial variations. Many non-imaging spectroradiometers are relatively smaller in sizes and utilized in ground-based applications. Some are used in laboratories while some are portable and can be used in the field.

=== Resolution ===
The resolution of spectroradiometers refers to the potential extent of details that can be detected by the sensors. In general, 4 kinds of resolutions are commonly specified for each spectroradiometer.

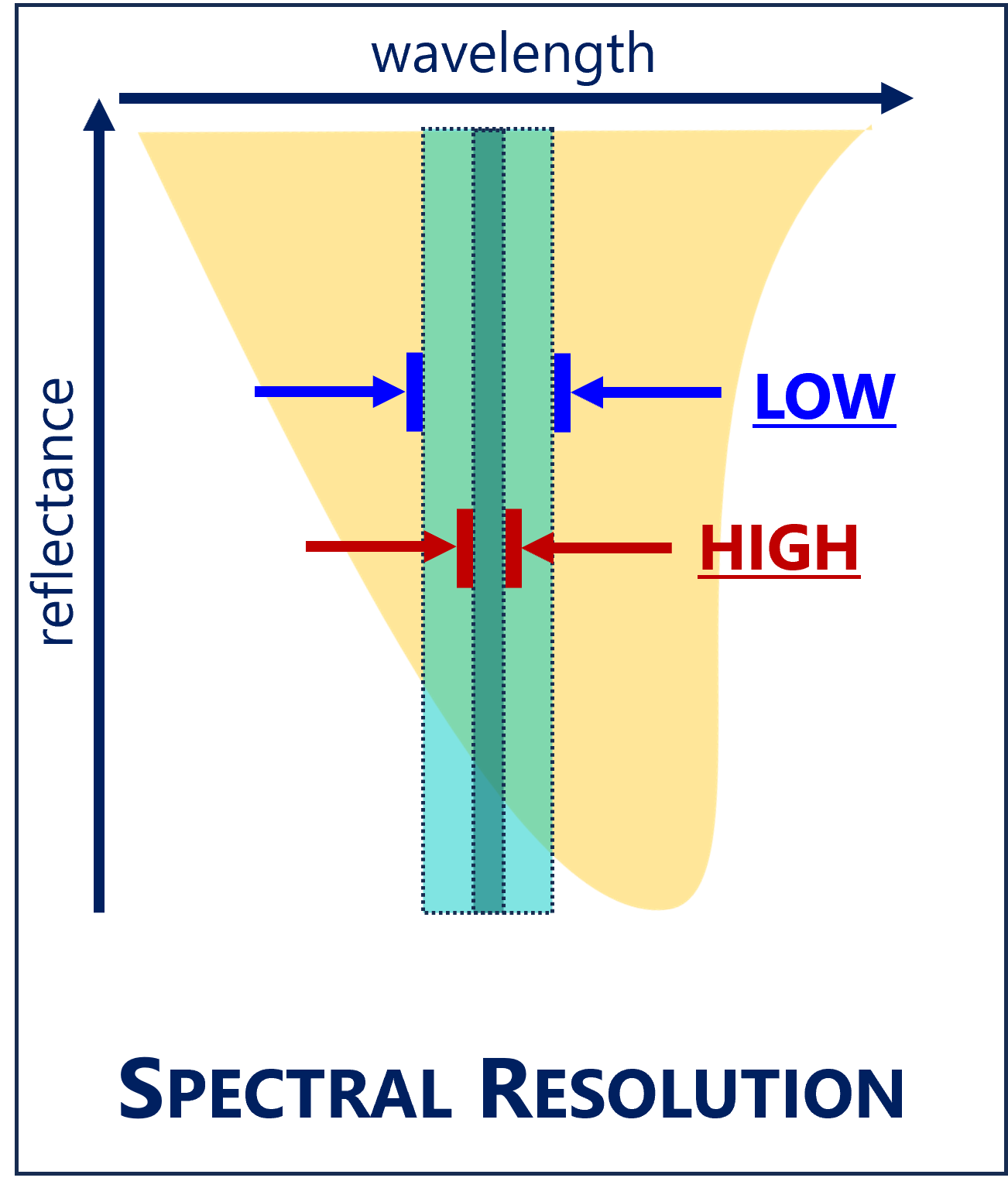
A visualization of spectral resolution. The area bounded by the curve represents the magnitude of electromagnetic radiation reflected by a given material at various wavelengths. Devices with high spectral resolution can measure the reflectance for the material within narrow bands of wavelength.

Spectral resolution concerns the capability of a sensor in a spectroradiometer to measure the light intensity according to specific wavelengths on the electromagnetic spectrum. It is related to the amount of spectral detail to be detected in each spectral band so as to discriminate among different materials. Described by the amount, wavelength interval, and width of spectral bands in which the sensor conducts wavelength measurements, a sensor with high spectral resolution would mean that it is able to capture a spectrum of light and divides it into hundreds or thousands of narrow spectral bands or channels with typical widths up to 10 and 20 nm.

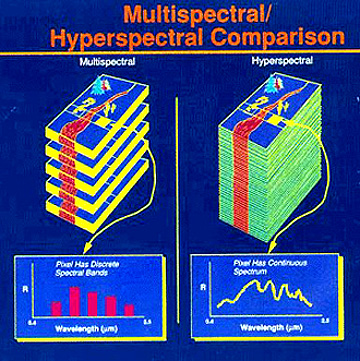
A figure illustrating the differences between multi- and hyperspectral imaging. A hyperspectral sensor collects spectral data in a continuous spectrum whereas a multispectral sensor collects spectral data in varying bandwidths in the EM spectrum.

In modern times, multi- and hyperspectral imaging sensors are mainly adopted in spectroradiometry. Unlike ordinary broadband sensors which possess only a few spectral bands for measurements, they enable the extraction of spectral properties in sufficiently high spectral resolutions, allowing for the detection and analysis of diagnostic absorption features in a continuous spectrum. Hyperspectral sensors divide the detected light intensity into many, narrow, and contiguous (i.e., adjacent) spectral bands to reconstruct a full spectrum, while multispectral sensors measures light intensity using spectral bands of varying bandwidths in the wavelength spectrum which might not be contiguous. Consequently, a hyperspectral sensor is often regarded as having greater spectral resolution in comparison to a multispectral sensor, hence a better potential in mineralogical diagnosis and lithology mapping.

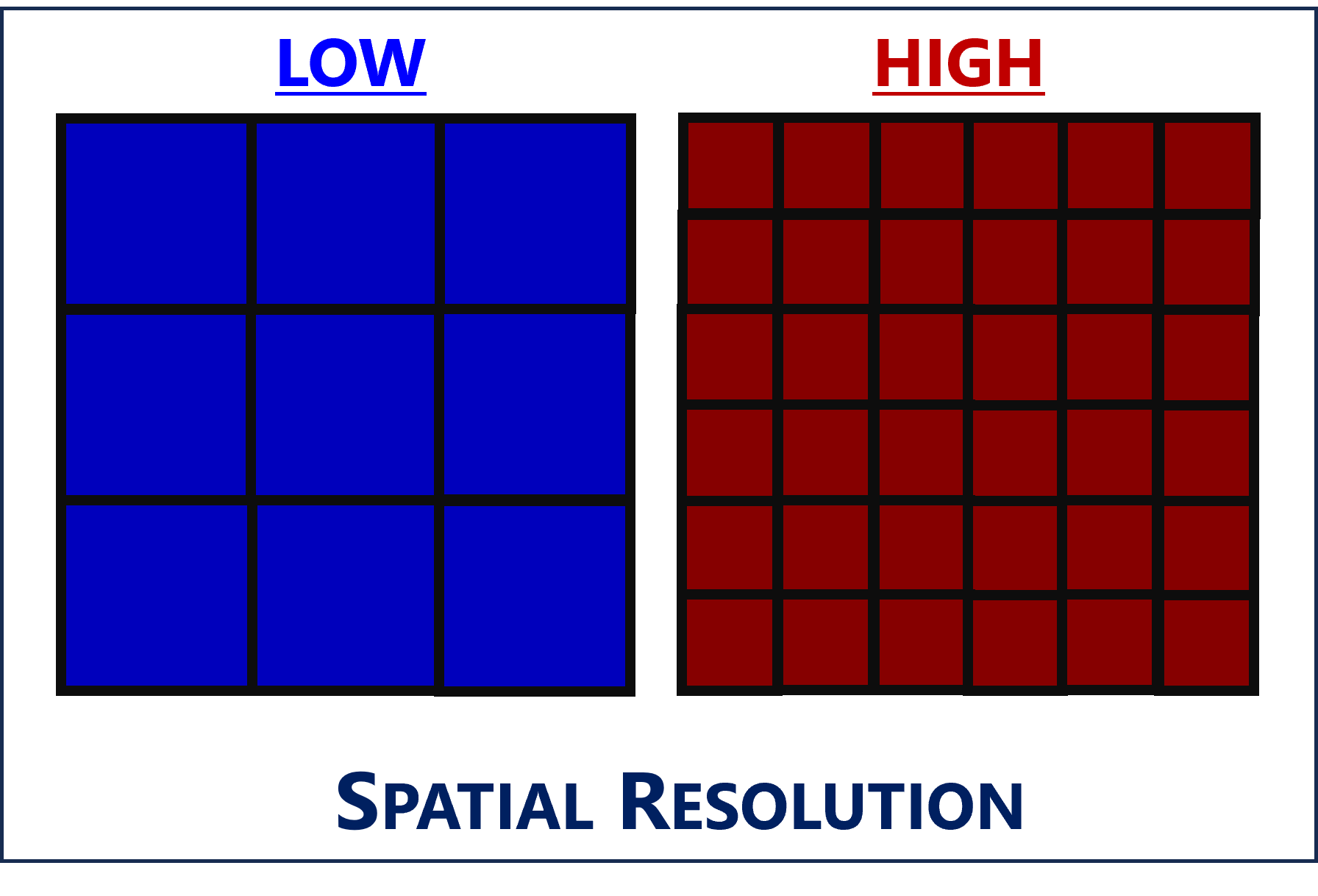
A visualization of spatial resolution, which refers to the level of detail or the smallest discernible features that can be captured by a given spectroradiometer.

Spatial resolution evaluates the quality of an image captured by imaging spectroradiometers. It describes the extent of spatial detail the sensors can record, i.e., the smallest feature detected, based on pixel and grid sizes of the captured digital imagery. A sensor with fine spatial resolution would capture an image with small grid cells, thus recording more spatial details and image pixels.

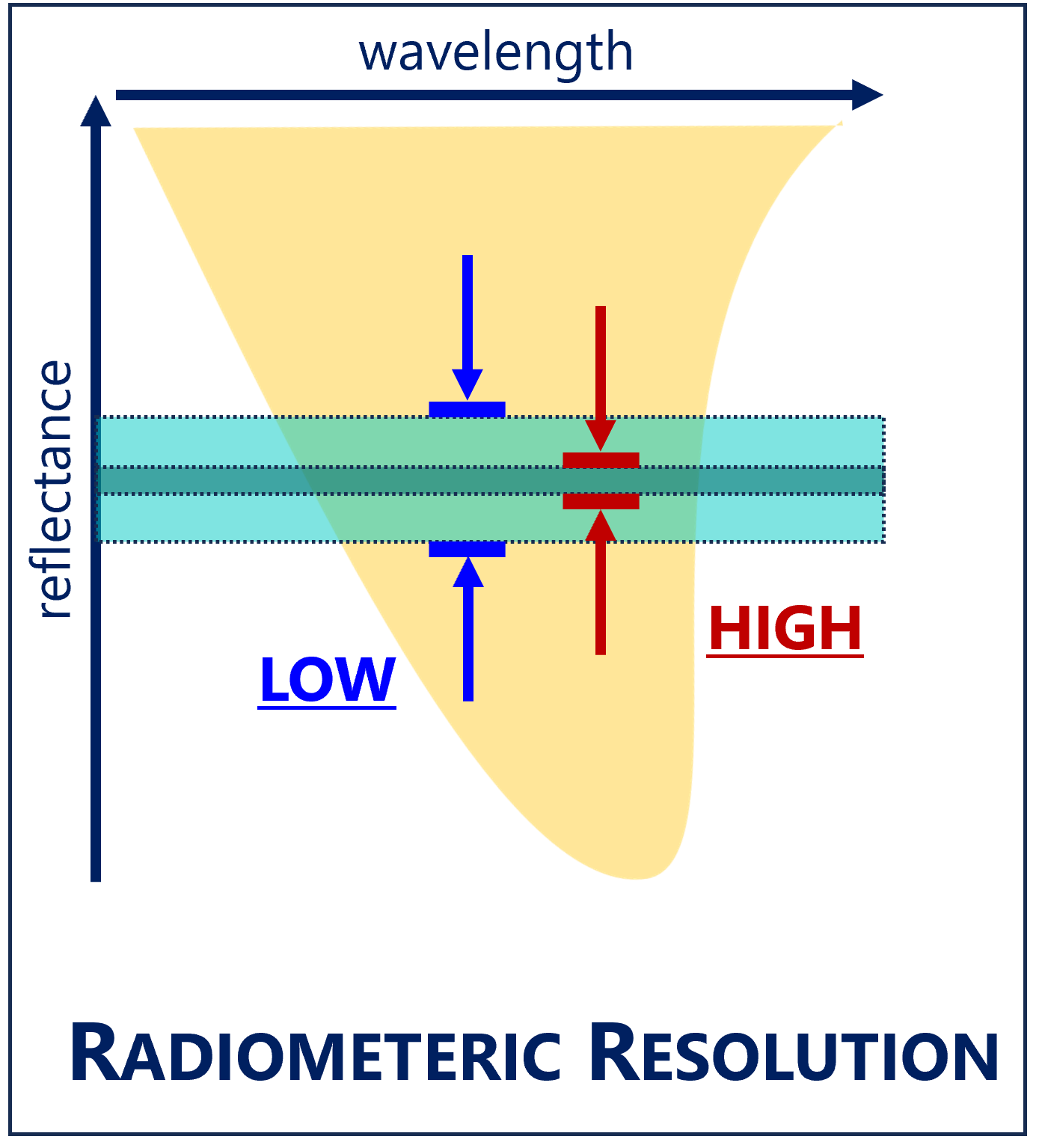
A visualization of radiometric resolution. The area bounded by the curve represents the magnitude of electromagnetic radiation reflected by a given material at various wavelengths. Devices with high radiometric resolution can precisely measure and detect relatively small differences in the values of reflectance for a given material.

Radiometric resolution deals with the sensitivity of a sensor towards measuring the magnitude of electromagnetic radiation and light intensity. A sensor with high radiometric resolution can detect and discriminate subtle variations in brightness and radiation magnitudes. In the context of multispectral imaging, the greater the number of data bits per pixel (bit depth) of the image recorded, the better the quality and interpretability of the image, thus the finer the radiometric resolution.

Temporal resolution is the frequency or the repeat cycle of a sensor, most commonly referring to sensors on imaging spectroradiometers, to capture images and acquire spectral information. An imaging spectroradiometer with high temporal resolution typically requires less time to complete spectral measurements of an image.

=== Practice ===
The following table shows the categories and some examples of spectroradiometers worldwide which are commonly used for spectral data collection in geoscience studies.

Common Worldwide Spectroradiometers with Geological applications
Spectroradiometer	Category	Resolution	Primary applications
NASA Terra Moderate Resolution Imaging Spectroradiometer (MODIS)	Spaceborne; Multispectral imaging	Spectral resolution: 250 m (bands 1–2); 500 m (bands 3–7); and 1000 m (bands 8–36); Temporal resolution: 1-2 Days	Study of Earth's surface processes; Monitoring of volcanic activity
Advanced Spaceborne Thermal Emission and Reflectance Radiometer (ASTER)	Spaceborne (onboard Terra satellite); Multispectral imaging	Spectral resolution: 15 m (bands 1–3); 30 m (bands 4–9); and 90 m (bands 10–14); Temporal resolution: 4-16 Days	Surface lithology mapping and mineral detection; Combined with digital elevation model for 3D analysis of land cover
Advanced Very-High-Resolution Radiometer (AVHRR)	Spaceborne; Multispectral imaging	Spatial resolution: 1.1 km	Study of Earth's surface processes; Monitoring of environmental changes
Airborne visible/infrared imaging spectrometer (AVIRIS)	Airborne; Hyperspectral imaging	Spectral resolution: 15 nm; Spatial resolution: 20 m	Multispectral pattern recognition for land cover changes; lithology and mineral mapping
Portable/ Handheld (field) spectroradiometer	Ground-based; Hyperspectral imaging	Spectral resolution: 2.8 nm (700 nm wavelength intervals); 8 nm (1500 nm wavelength intervals); 6 nm (2100 nm wavelength intervals)	High resolution lithology and mineral mapping; Mining and ore exploration; Soil analysis

== Other applications ==
- Ground truthing
- Soil analysis and monitoring
- Forest canopy and vegetation studies
- Landscape ecology studies
- Agricultural studies
- Biodiversity conservation
- Water quality assessments
- Camouflage characterization and detection

== See also ==
- Spectroradiometer
- Radiometry
- Multispectral imaging
- Hyperspectral imaging
- Reflectance
- Ultraviolet-visible spectroscopy
- Infrared spectroscopy
