= Regolith-hosted rare earth element deposits =

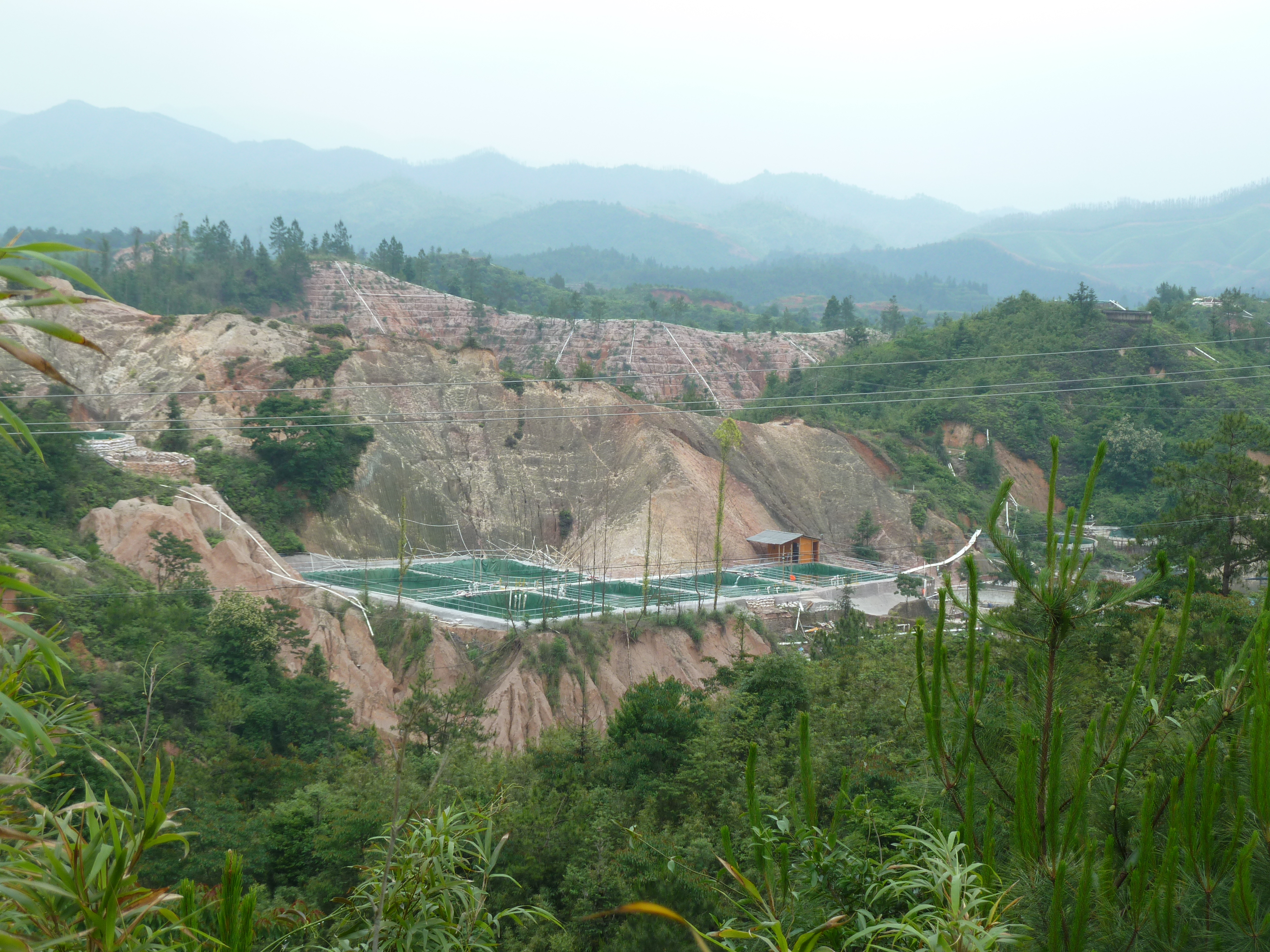
An overview of one of the regolith-hosted rare earth element deposits (a type of Rare Earth Element mine) in South China

Regolith-hosted rare earth element deposits (also known as ion-adsorption deposits) are rare-earth element (REE) ores in decomposed rocks that are formed by intense weathering of REE-rich parental rocks (e.g. granite, tuff etc.) in subtropical areas. In these areas, rocks are intensely broken and decomposed. Then, REEs infiltrate downward with rain water and they are concentrated along a deeper weathered layer beneath the ground surface.

Extraction technology of the deposits has been evolving over the last 50 years. In the past, REEs were primarily extracted in small amount as by-products in mines of other metals or granitic sands at the beach. However, in recent decades, the development of the high-tech industries (e.g. aerospace engineering, telecommunication etc.) leads to high demand for REEs. Hence, regolith-hosted rare earth element deposits were recognised and extraction technologies have been rapidly developed since the 1980s.

Currently, China dominates more than 95% of the global REE production. Regolith-hosted rare earth element deposits, which contributes 35% of China's REE production, are mainly found in South China.

== Global distribution ==
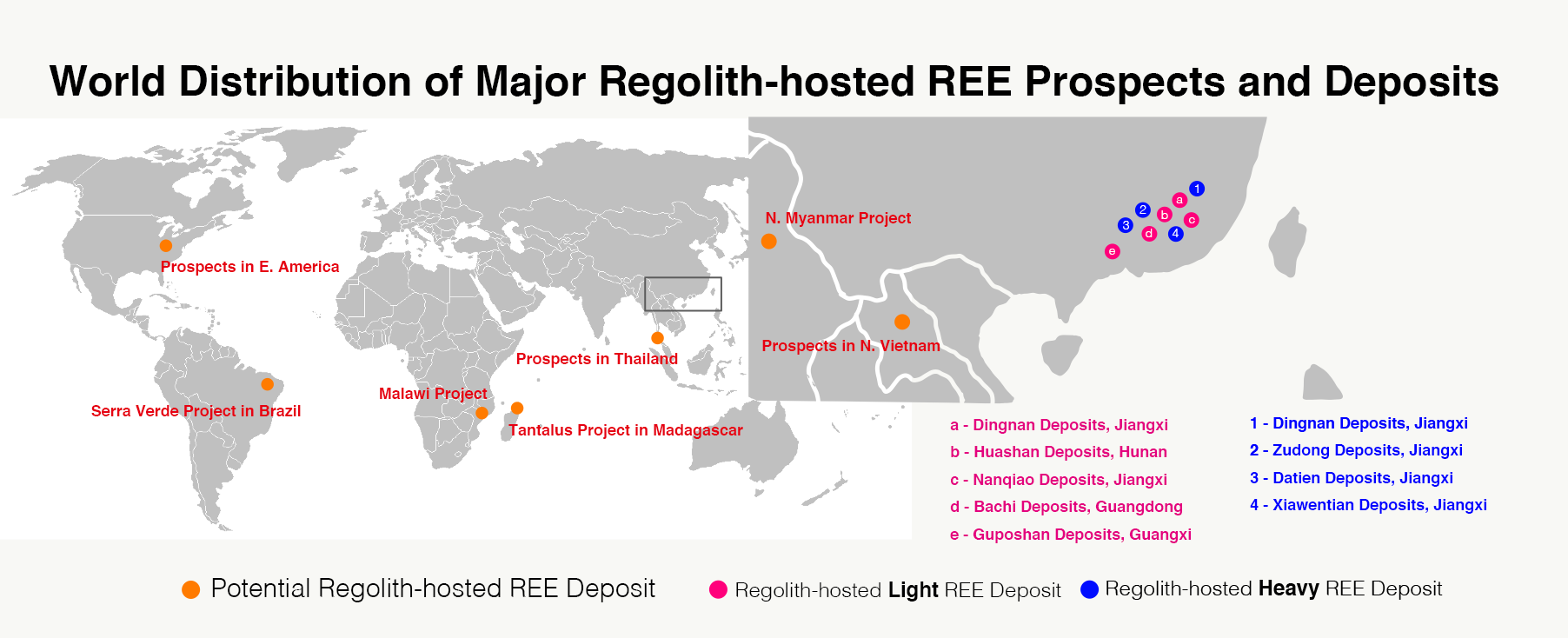
World distribution of regolith-hosted REE deposits

Regoliths are unconsolidated deposits of fragmented and decomposed rocks and may include dust, soil, broken rock, and other related materials. They are the source of minerals and construction materials and if they contain much biological material are known as soils. Most of the regolith-hosted rare earth mineral deposits are found in South China, which currently dominates more than 95% of global REE production. There are two major types of deposit, namely "light" rare earth elements (LREE) (i.e. La, Ce, Pr and Nd) deposit and middle and heavy rare earth elements (HREE) (i.e. Sm, Eu, Gd, Dy, Ho, Er, Tm, Yb and Lu) deposit.

Both of these types are mainly found in Jiangxi, Hunan, Guangdong and Fujian province. The Zudong deposit in Jiangxi, the Datian and the Xiawentian deposits are the major HREE-mines in South China. Meanwhile, LREE is dominated by the Heling deposit and the Dingnan deposit in Jiangxi Province.

Meanwhile, exploration for this kind of deposit are actively taking place across the world. Currently, some potential deposits have been discovered in the US, Southeast Asia, Malawi, Brazil and Madagascar.

== Geological overview ==
Regolith-hosted rare earth element deposits are found along ridges in low-lying granitic hills in South China. The ore deposit can be profiled into four layers based on its extent of weathering while the orebody lies at lower layer of weathered soil.

=== Geomorphology ===
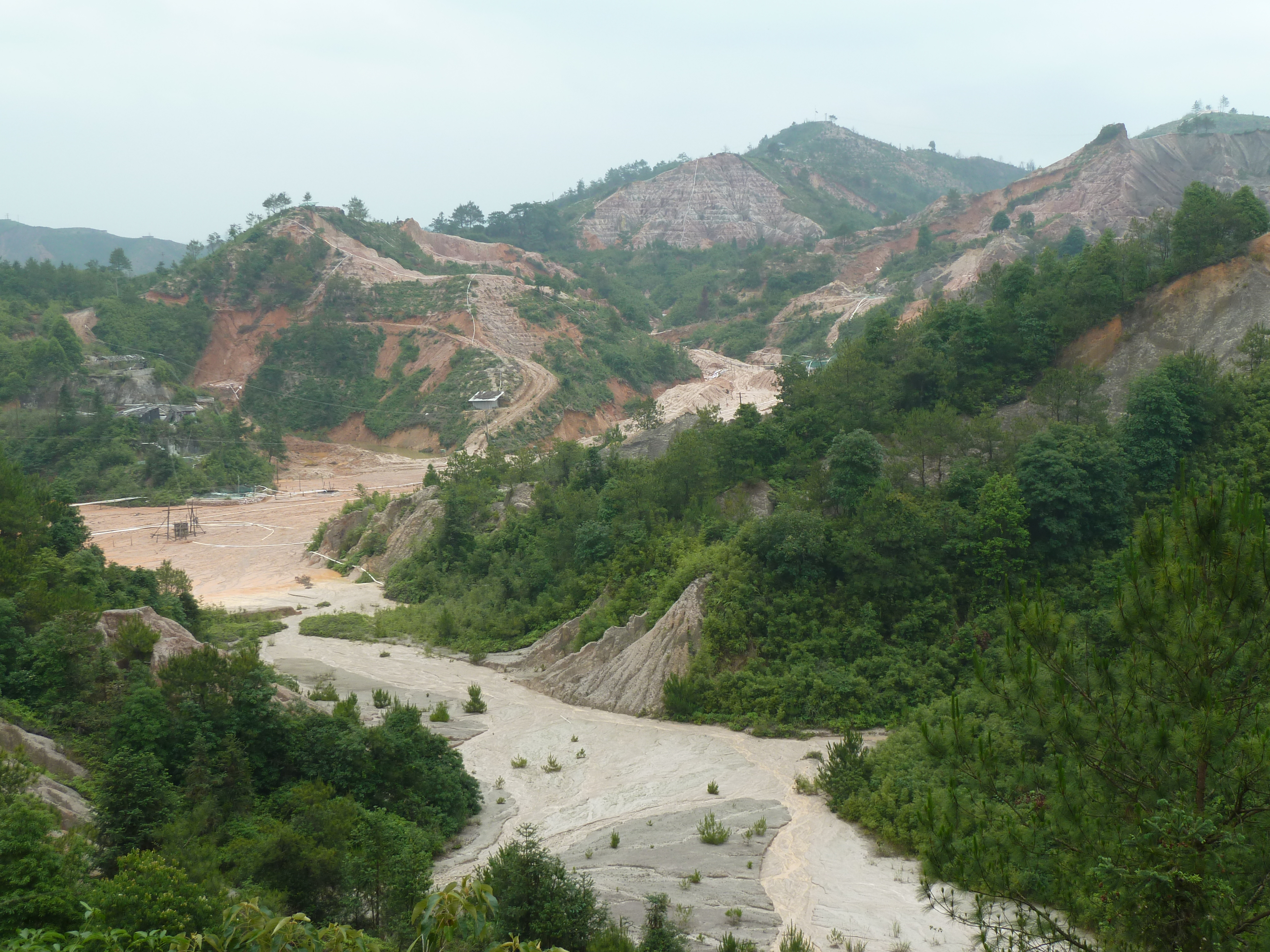
Common landscape in South China: low-lying areas with densely vegetated low hills

The morphology of the deposits in South China (southern Jiangxi, southwestern Fujian, northern Guangdong and northwestern Guangxi in particular) is determined by both regional and local factors.

Regionally, the deposits are generally found in areas with low topography, low hills lower than 500 m in elevation. Moreover, as located in subtropical area, South China has a warm and humid climate. Therefore, the deposits are often densely-vegetated.

Locally, the deposits tend to form along ridges, rather than valleys. Thicker weathering crust, together with its associated orebody is found along ridges while its thickness decreases valley-wards or down slope.

=== Ore-body profile ===
The whole weathering crust can range from 30 to 60m in thickness, depending on its local structural, geomorphological, and hydrogeological conditions. In general, the deposit can be divided into 4 layers with accordance to its weathering intensity. Taking a 25-m-thick weathering crust as an example, its weathering profile is as illustrated as below:

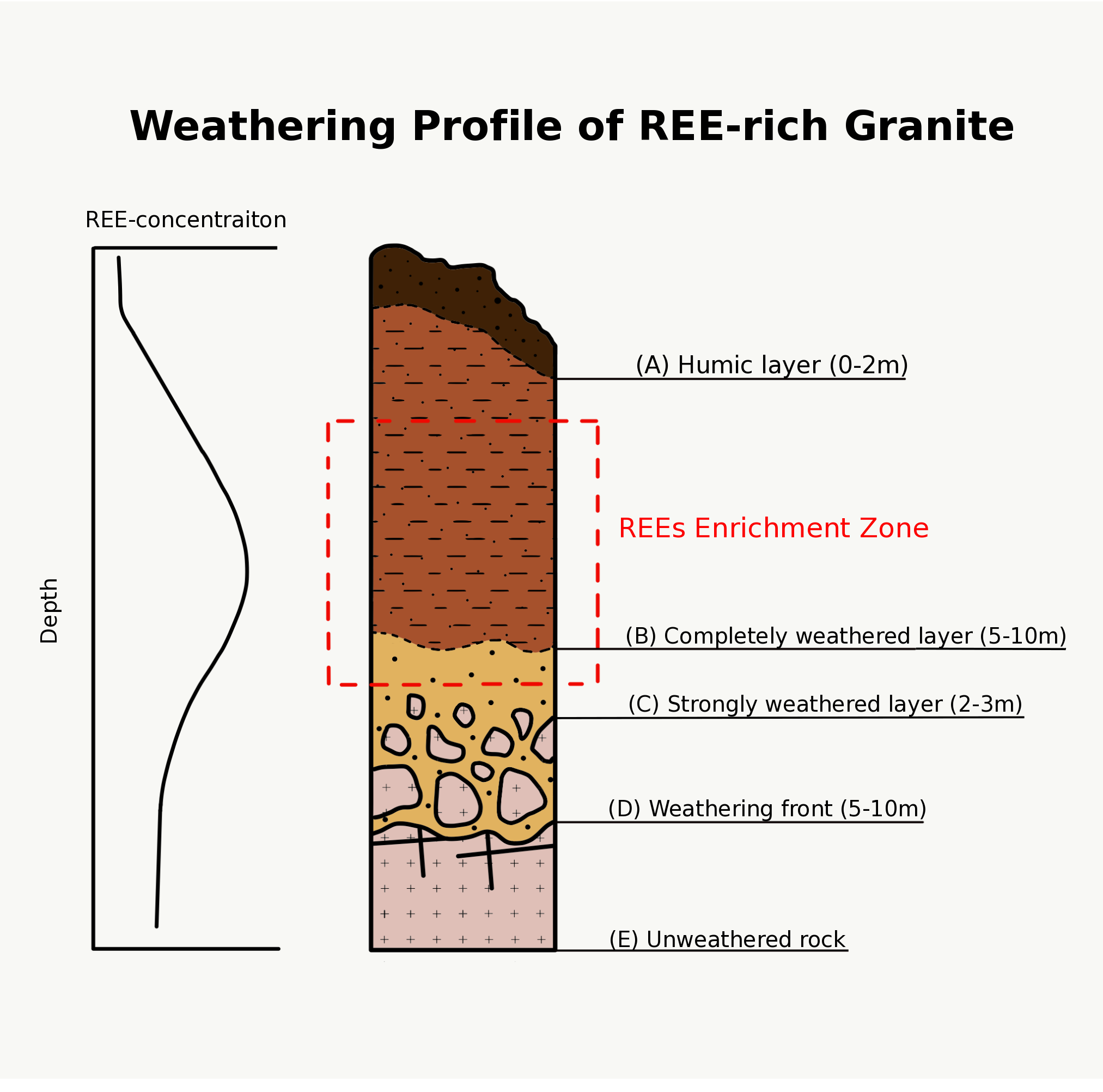
Weathering Profile of Regolith-hosted REE Deposits. (A) Humic layer. (B) Completely weathered layer. (C) Strongly weathered layer. (D) Weathering front. (E) Unweathered rock.

Weathering profile of REE-rich granite
Distinctive layer	Thickness (m)	Lithology	REE content
(A) Humic layer	0–2	– Dark brown – Organic matter and aggregation of soil grains	Depleted
(B) Completely weathered layer	5–10 (occasionally up to 40 m thick)	– Mottled yellowish white and orangish red – 80% clay minerals (i.e. kaolinite, halloysite etc.) – 20% unaltered minerals (i.e. quartz, micas etc.) – No relict granitic texture preserved	Depleted at top; Enriched at bottom
(C) Strongly weathered layer	2–3 (occasionally up to 20 m thick)	– Spotted white, pinkish brown – ≤ 30% clay minerals (i.e. kaolinite, sericite etc.) – Unaltered rock forming minerals (i.e. feldspar, biotite, quartz etc.) – Relict granitic texture preserved	Depleted at bottom; Enriched at top
(D) Weathering front	5–10	– Transition zone with unweathered bedrock – Abundant core-stones surrounded by regolith	Depleted
(E) Unweathered rock	/	– Bedrock	N/A

REE enrichment generally occurs as a 5-to-10-meter-thick zone between the completely weathered layer and strongly weathered layer and it is targeted for commercial mining. Compared to other REE deposits, regolith-hosted rare earth element deposits are substantially low-grade (containing 0.05-0.3 wt.% extractable REEs). Nevertheless, due to its easy extraction method, low processing costs and large abundance, the orebodies are economic to be extracted.

== Genesis of orebody ==
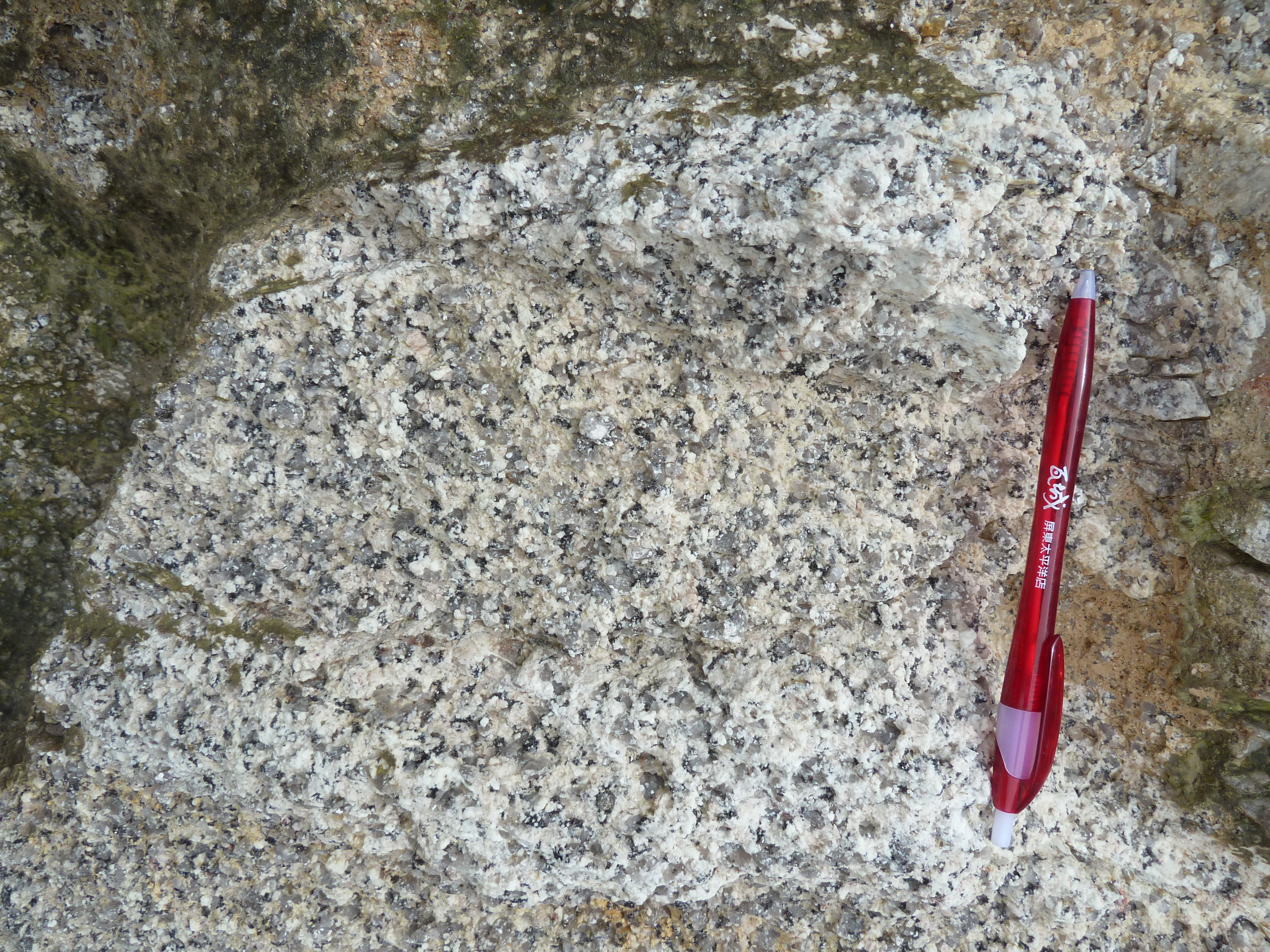
Semi-weathered parental rock of regolith-hosted rare earth element deposits – REE-enriched granitoid

The followings are some key aspects of ideas in the genesis of regolith-hosted rare earth element deposits. Deposit-forming magma is sourced from either LREE- or HREE-enriched granitic magma and it is not necessarily related to any special tectonic settings or geological time periods. Then, LREE or HREE experiences first stage enrichment through its own mechanism when magma solidifies. After the granite is brought to ground surface, it experiences intense denudation and exhumation in subtropic areas. At this stage, REEs are further enriched, which makes mining economical. These processes are discussed in details below:

=== Magmatic origins ===
In terms of tectonic settings, no obvious trend in tectonic setting that favours the formation of regolith-hosted rare earth element deposits is observed. Geologists had long believed that among different magma sources, magmas originated formed anorogenic (non-mountain building) and anhydrous settings (e.g. divergent plate boundaries), which consequently form A-type granites, are REEs-enriched. This is because lower degree of partial melting in this tectonic setting favours the enrichment of the REEs, which are incompatible and tend to melt preferentially. However, from field observations, A-type granite is not outstandingly REEs-enriched (in Total REE %). Instead, it is similar to I-type granites (sourced from magma of partially-melted igneous rocks) and S-type granites (sourced from magma of partially-melted sedimentary rocks), which are originated from orogenic (mountain-building) settings (e.g. convergent plate boundaries).

In terms of geological times, these REEs-enriched granites which formed evenly over a wide geological time period (i.e. from Ordovician to Cretaceous), showing that these deposits are not formed in special environments related to any major geological events.

=== Magmatic-hydrothermal processes ===
In general, parental rocks of regolith-hosted rare earth element deposits are felsic igneous rocks (e.g. granite, rhyolite, rhyolitic tuff etc.), which are associated with granitic magmatism and volcanism in subduction system. During magma crystallisation, LREE and HREE are primarily enriched in granitoids through two separate mechanisms.

- Evolutionary diagram showing the first stage of LREE-enrichment process by magma differentiation.
  LREE enrichment: LREE-enriched granitoids are formed by magma differentiation, which progressively fractionates magma composition into chemically distinctive layers during its cooling process. As REEs are incompatible elements (less preferred to incorporate into the structure of solidifying crystals), they remain as melt in magma chamber until the last stage of cooling. Therefore, the last and the uppermost fraction of granitoid is highly REEs-enriched.
- Evolutionary diagram showing the first stage of HREE-enrichment process by auto-metasomatism.
  HREE enrichment: HREE-enriched granitoids are formed by auto-metasomatism. It is a process of chemical alterations of recently crystallised felsic magma by the left-over hydrothermal fluid (e.g. water, CO_{2} etc.) at the later stage of magma crystallisation. During the chemical alteration, through various chemical reactions with hydrothermal fluids, HREEs are then introduced into secondary minerals along veinlets.

=== Secondary processes ===
Secondary process (i.e. weathering) is essential in further enrichment of HREE-/LREE-rich granitoid. It turns the granitoid to an economically extractable orebody. Therefore, warm and humid climate, together with slightly acidic soil in subtropical zones favour the formation of regolith-hosted rare earth element deposits. A combination of intense chemical, physical and microbiological weathering allows the removal of REEs in upper, more acidic completely weathered layer, downward migration through rainwater and eventually, deposition (and concentration) at lower, less acidic moderately weathered layer. (REE forms a more stable complex in soil with higher pH).

In addition, intense weathering in subtropical areas (i.e. South China) continuously removes significant volume of overlying materials from the in-situ weathering system, which is a process called denudation. In response to the mass removal, exhumation (an isostatic-uplifting process which deep-seated rock is brought to the land surface) occurs and hence, replenishes materials for on-going denudation. Thus, the dynamic equilibrium system between denudation and exhumation further facilitates the development of thicker weathering profile as well as the accumulation of REEs.

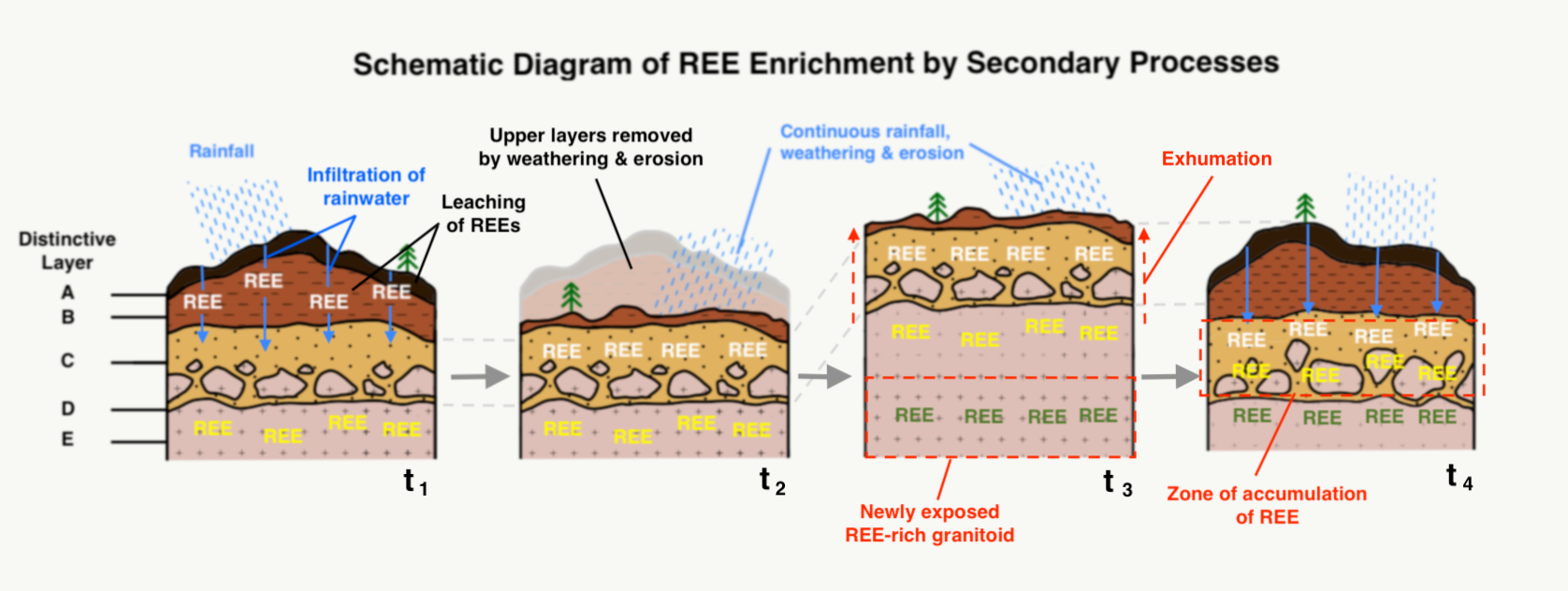
Abundant rainwater causes rapid infiltration and leaching of REEs to layer B and C. (Figure t_{1}) Moreover, secondary processes (i.e. weathering and erosion) remove upper layers of materials.(Figure t_{2}) In response to the ongoing removal of over-laying landmass, isostatic-uplifting process (exhumation) occurs continuously. (Figure t_{3}) Hence, the dynamic equilibrium system between denudation and exhumation further facilitates the accumulation of REEs. (Figure t_{4})

== Phases of occurrence ==
In regolith-hosted rare earth element deposits, rare earth elements ores do not exist as free ions. Instead, they physically adhere on clay minerals as clay-REE complex or chemically bond with REE-hosting minerals.

=== Clay-REE ===
Exchangeable phase (i.e. Clay-REE) accounts for 60-90% of the total REE content in the deposits. In this phase, REEs occur as mobile cations (i.e. REE^{3+}), hydrated cations (i.e. [REE(H_{2}O)_{n}]^{3+}or a part of positively charged complexes, which are adsorbed (physically adhered by weak electrostatic attraction) at sites of permanent negative charge on clay minerals (e.g. kaolinite, halloysite, illite etc.) Thus, REEs can be recovered and extracted easily by ion-exchange leaching with dilute electrolyte.

=== REE-hosting minerals ===
Mineral phases (i.e. REE-hosting minerals) account for 10-30% of the REE content in the deposits. REEs are incorporated in accessory minerals (i.e. Bastnäsite (REE)(CO_{3)}F, Monazite (REE)PO_{4} and Xenotime (Y,REE)PO_{4}) as a part of crystal lattice. As REEs are held by chemical bonds, alkaline bake or acid leach is required to decompose and extract REEs.

== Extraction techniques ==
Chemical leaching is used to extract REEs in regolith-hosted REE deposits. By injecting leaching solution (lixiviant) to an orebody, REEs adhered to clay minerals are displaced by the ions of the leaching solution and dissolve into the leaching solution, which flows downward along the orebody. The equation below shows an example of ion-exchange reaction between REE-adhered clay mineral and lixiviant (metal sulphate).

$\ce{2 Clay-REE + 3 M2SO4 -> 2 Clay-M3 + REE2(SO4)3}$

Since the discovery of this type of deposits in 1960s, leaching procedure has experienced three successive generations of technology, evolution in the use of leaching solution (lixiviant) and leaching techniques, which are summarised as follows:

=== First generation leaching technology ===
In the early 1970s, batch leaching using sodium chloride solution (NaCl) was carried out in the extraction of REEs. Firstly, REE-ores were extracted and sieved by open-pit mining. Then, they are leached in barrels with ~1M NaCl solution and precipitated with oxalic acid (C_{2}H_{2}O_{4}).

However, mining scale was highly limited by batch leaching (or bath leaching in late 1970s, using concrete pools instead of barrel) while high concentration of lixiviant could only produce low yield product with poor product quality (<70% of REE in concentration). These drawbacks surpassed the originals benefits of this kind of deposits (i.e. short processing time and extremely low costs).

=== Second generation leaching technology ===
In 1980s, batch and heap leach using ~0.3M ammonium sulphate solution ((NH_{4})_{2}SO_{4}) was developed. REEs-bearing soil was mined from orebodies and piled up on a flat leak-proof layer with a collecting dish at the bottom. (NH_{4})_{2}SO_{4} solution was then injected on top of the soil and allowed for leaching. After 100 to 320 hours, REE extraction (with purity up to 90%) was collected for final processing.

Due to stronger desorption capability of NH_{4}^{+} compared with Na^{+}, the technology had an improved final product quality and a reduction in lixiviant consumption. Hence, it had been used as a primary model of REE leaching process in the following 30 years.

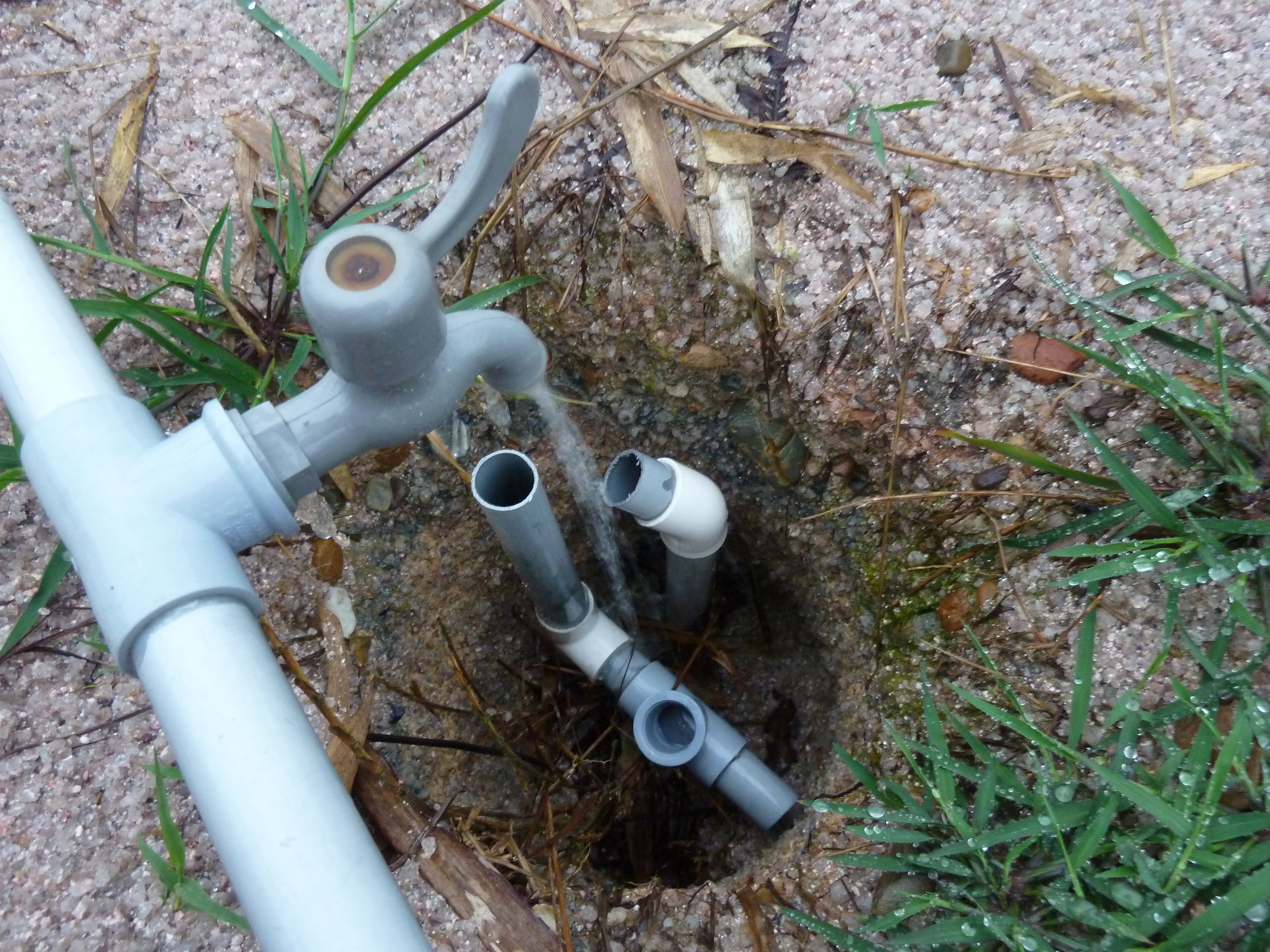
Lixiviant (Leaching solution) is injected through plastics pipes, which are inserted into a leach hole.

=== Modern mining methods (The third generation) ===
In the last three decades, intense use of batch and heap leaching has posed a devastating and irreversible effect on the environment as well as the ecosystem in South China. Unregulated disposal of waste has also brought health problems to the residents near the mines. Thus, a compulsory in-situ leaching technology was implemented in 2011 to minimise aforementioned adverse effects.

In-situ leaching technology requires comprehensive geological survey of local hydrogeological structure, rock joints pattern and ore characteristics in order to design a catchment area for the leaching process. Then, vertical leaching holes (0.8 m in diameter and 2 to 3 m apart) are drilled to reach the top of the REE-enriched layer (B) (1.5 to 3 m in depth) to allow injection of pressurised lixiviant (i.e. ~0.3M (NH_{4})_{2}SO_{4}). Finally, the REEs-loaded leaching solution is collected by recovery ponds at the bottom of orebody for final processing.

=== Current research and development (Bioleaching) ===
Recently, researchers have been developing various techniques to increase the yield of leaching REE. Bioleaching, a technique where REEs are solubilised by microbial activities or by-products of microbial metabolism, is actively studied as a greener alternative to the current method, which has been serious pollution to the environment. In terms of extraction effectiveness, some studies have reported that the recovery of REE by bioleaching could vary from less than 1% to nearly 90%. Thus, further understanding of the bioleaching mechanism is required before it is commercially practised.

== Applications of Rare Earth Elements ==
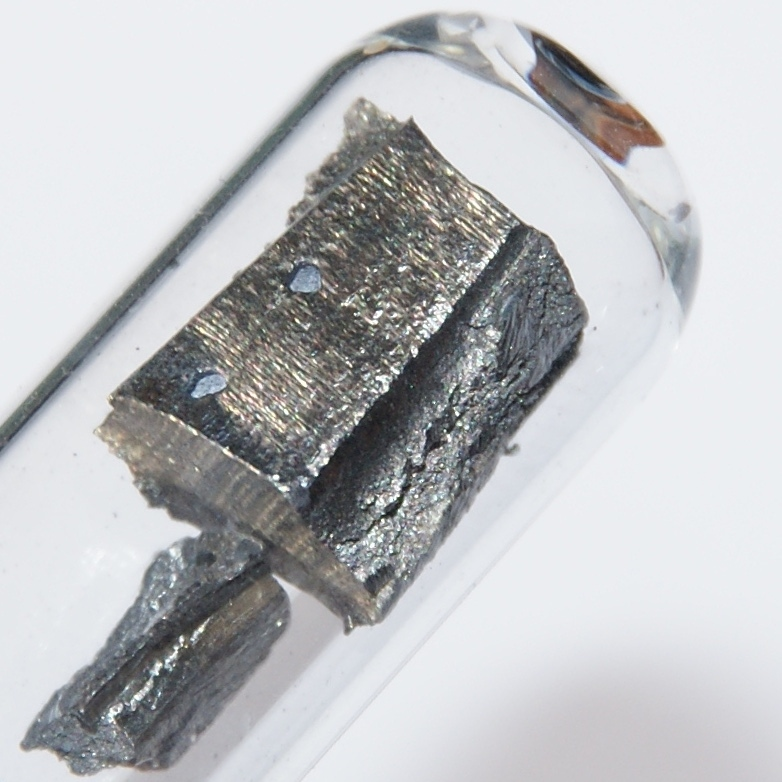
A sample of Neodymium.

Rare earth elements, the products of regolith-hosted REE deposits, are the fundamental building blocks of many daily-life high-tech products. Some of the examples and their applications are provided as follows.

Neodymium is used in the production of strong magnets in loudspeakers and computer hardware with a smaller size and better performance. Moreover, together with its excellent durability, neodymium is widely applied in wind turbines and hybrid vehicles.

Praseodymium metal has ultra-high strength and melting point so it is an important component in jet engines. Praseodymium is used in a special type of glass, for the manufacture of visors to protect welders and glassmakers.

Scandium is used in building the framework of aircraft or spacecraft to increase strength. It is also used in high-intensity street lamps.

Cerium is used in catalytic converters in vehicles due to its high chemical stability under high temperature. More importantly, it is responsible for the chemical reactions in the converter.

Gadolinium compounds are the active component in various MRI contrast agents.

For more applications of other rare earth elements, check "Rare-earth element#List".

== See also ==
- Rare-earth element
- Adsorption
- Leaching
