= Earth materials =

Naturally occurring materials found on Earth

Earth materials include minerals, rocks, soil and water. These are the naturally occurring materials found on Earth that constitute the raw materials upon which our global society exists. Earth materials are vital resources that provide the basic components for life, agriculture and industry.

Oceanic-continental convergence resulting in subduction and volcanic arcs illustrates one effect of plate tectonics.

Cross-cutting relations can be used to determine the relative ages of rock strata and other geological structures. Explanations: A – folded rock strata cut by a thrust fault; B – large intrusion (cutting through A); C – erosional angular unconformity (cutting off A & B) on which rock strata were deposited; D – volcanic dyke (cutting through A, B & C); E – even younger rock strata (overlying C & D); F – normal fault (cutting through A, B, C & E).

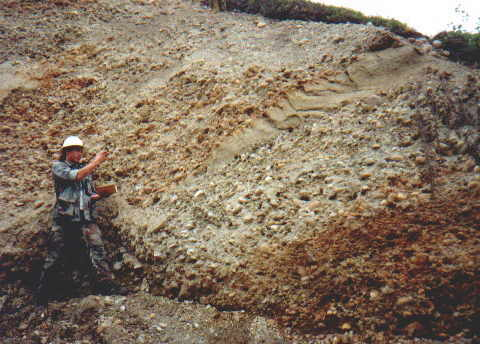
Alluvial gravels in Alaska

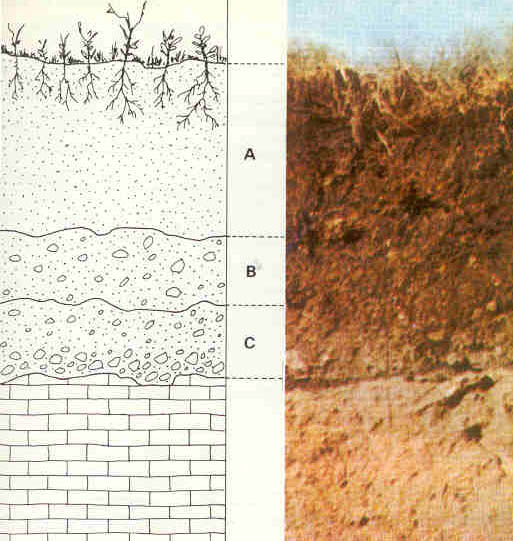
A, B, and C represent the soil profile, a notation firstly coined by Vasily Dokuchaev, the father of pedology; A is the topsoil; B is a regolith; C is a saprolite, a less-weathered regolith; the bottom-most layer represents the bedrock.

== Definitions ==
The type of materials available locally will of course vary depending upon the conditions in the area of the building site. Take considerations of what is explained below.

In many areas, indigenous stone is available from the local region, such as limestone, marble, granite, and sandstone. It may be cut in quarries or removed from the surface of the ground (flag and fieldstone). Ideally, stone from the building site can be utilized. Depending on the stone type, it can be used for structural block, facing block, pavers, and crushed stone.

Most brick plants are located near the clay source they use to make brick. Bricks are molded and baked blocks of clay. Brick products come in many forms, including structural brick, face brick, roof tile, structural tile, paving brick, and floor tile.

Caliche is a soft limestone material which is mined from areas with calcium-carbonate soils and limestone bedrock. It is best known as a road bed material, but it can be processed into an unfired building block, stabilized with an additive such as cement. Other earth materials include soil blocks typically stabilized with a cement additive and produced with forms or compression.

Rammed Earth consists of walls made from moist, sandy soil, or stabilized soil, which is tamped into form work. Walls are a minimum of 12″ thick. Soils should contain about 30% clay and 70% sand.

== Considerations ==
The use of locally available and indigenous earth materials has several advantages in terms of sustainability. They are:

Reduction of energy costs related to transportation. Reduction of material costs due to reduced transportation costs, especially for well-established industries. Support of local businesses and resource bases. Care must be taken to ensure that non-renewable earth materials are not over-extracted. Ecological balance within the region needs to be maintained while efficiently utilizing its resources. Many local suppliers carry materials that have been shipped in from out of the area, so it is important to ask for locally produced/quarried materials.

Both brick and stone materials are aesthetically pleasing, durable, and low maintenance. Exterior walls weather well, eliminating the need for constant refinishing and sealing. Interior use of brick and stone can also provide excellent thermal mass, or be used to provide radiant heat. Some stone and brick makes an ideal flooring or exterior paving material, cool in summer and possessing good thermal properties for passive solar heating. Caliche block has been produced for applications similar to stone and brick mentioned above. Caliche or earth material block has special structural and finishing characteristics.

Rammed earth is more often considered for use in walls, although it can also be used for floors. Rammed earth and caliche block can be used for structural walls, and offer great potential as low-cost material alternatives with low embodied energy. In addition, such materials are fireproof.

Caliche block and rammed earth can be produced on-site. It is very important to have soils tested for construction material use. Some soils, such as highly expansive or bentonite soils, are not suitable for structural use. Testing labs are available in most areas to determine material suitability for structural use and meeting codes.

Soils for traditional adobe construction are not found in some areas, but other soils for earth building options are available. Many areas have a high percentage of soils suitable for ramming. (Official areas are approximately 19,610 acres in the Austin, TX area, according to the US. Department of Agriculture).

Caliche is also abundant in many areas (covering 14% of the Austin geographic area, for instance) and is readily available locally.

== See also ==
- Structure of Earth
- Earth structure
