= Mineral alteration =

Natural processes that alter a mineral's composition

Mineral alteration is the various natural processes that alter a mineral's chemical composition or crystallography.

Mineral alteration is essentially governed by the laws of thermodynamics related to energy conservation, relevant to environmental conditions, often in presence of catalysts, the most common and influential being water (H_{2}O).

The degree and scales of time in which different minerals alter vary depending on the initial product and its physical properties and susceptibility to alteration. Some minerals such as quartz and zircon are highly resistant to alteration under normal weathering conditions. Yet quartz may alter to stishovite with intense pressure, and zircon to cyrtolite (a metamict zircon) with amount of radioactive components and time.

In some circumstances, a mineral alters while maintaining its outer form known as a pseudomorph.

Mineral alteration is distinctly different than the rock alteration process metamorphism. It also differs from weathering. However, these processes assist in mineral alteration. Some minerals are members of a solid solution series and are samples of a range of compositional changes in a continuum, and thus are not 'mineral alteration' products.

== Examples of mineral alterations ==
=== Oxidation ===
A common oxidation example is when a natural ferrous iron mineral such as pyrite is oxidized to form goethite or other ferric iron hydroxides or sulfates. 5(4x + 3)/2 = y

=== Hydration and dehydration ===
With prolonged desiccation, a common hydrous sulfate mineral called gypsum readily alters to an anhydrous sulfate called anhydrite.

CaSO_{4}·2H_{2}O <=> CaSO_{4}

This is a reversible reaction.

=== Kaolinization ===
Kaolinization refers to the alteration of alkali feldspar into the clay mineral kaolinite in the presence of slightly acidic solutions. Rain readily dissolves carbon dioxide (CO_{2}) from the atmosphere, promoting weathering of granitic rocks. As demonstrated in the following reaction, in the presence of carbonic acid and water, potassium feldspar is altered to kaolinite, with potassium ion, bicarbonate, and silica in solution as byproducts.

2 KAlSi_{3}O_{8} + 2 H_{2}CO_{3} + 9 H_{2}O => Al_{2}Si_{2}O_{5}(OH)_{4} + 4 H_{4}SiO_{4} + 2 K^{+} + 2 HCO_{3}^{−}

=== Epidotization ===
Epidotization is the alteration process in which plagioclase feldspars convert into the epidote group minerals.

=== Chloritization ===
Chloritization is the alteration of pyroxene or amphibole minerals into the chlorite group minerals. Chloritization is a common process in metamorphic transitions to the greenschist facies, and amphibolite facies retrograde metamorphism.

=== Shock induced alteration ===
As observed in and around astroblemes such as impact craters, ordinary silica or quartz crystals may alter to the minerals stishovite and coesite as a result of meteorite impacts producing an extreme pressure and high temperature environment.

=== Radioactive decay ===
A common example of a radioactive decay alteration is when a radioactive element bearing zircon or allanite crystal becomes metamict or amorphous due to structural damage.

=== Serpentinization ===
Serpentinization is the mineral alteration process that results in the formation of serpentine group of minerals mainly from the olivine group, with hydration and changes in pressure as major factors.

=== Dolomitization ===
Dolomitization refers to the varied suggested manners in which a predominantly calcite rich calcium bearing sedimentary rock such as limestone may alter into the magnesian dolomite rich rock dolomite. Diagenesis is a likely culprit that involves volumes of water and fairly low heat, as an ionic exchange catalyst. The reaction is as follows:

2CaCO_{3(limestone)} + Mg^{2+} -> CaMg(CO_{3})_{2(dolomite)} + Ca^{2+}

=== Pyritization ===
Pyritization involves the ionic replacement by iron and sulfur atoms that combine to form the mineral pyrite.

=== Opalization ===
Opalization is the alteration of amorphous silica, often as organic remains of siliceous microfossils in lithified sedimentary rocks, into the mineraloid opal.

=== Uralitization ===
Uralitization is the process of deuteric alteration of pyroxene (most commonly augite) to form amphibole (actinolite-tremolite). The alteration occurs during either late-stages of magmatic crystallization at low temperatures (< 500 °C) or during low-grade metamorphic events (sub-greenschist facies metamorphism). The reaction is paramorphic, meaning that the structure of the mineral is modified, but its original chemistry is retained.
