= Eaton Fire =

2025 wildfire in Los Angeles County, California, USA

- Part of the January 2025 Southern California wildfires
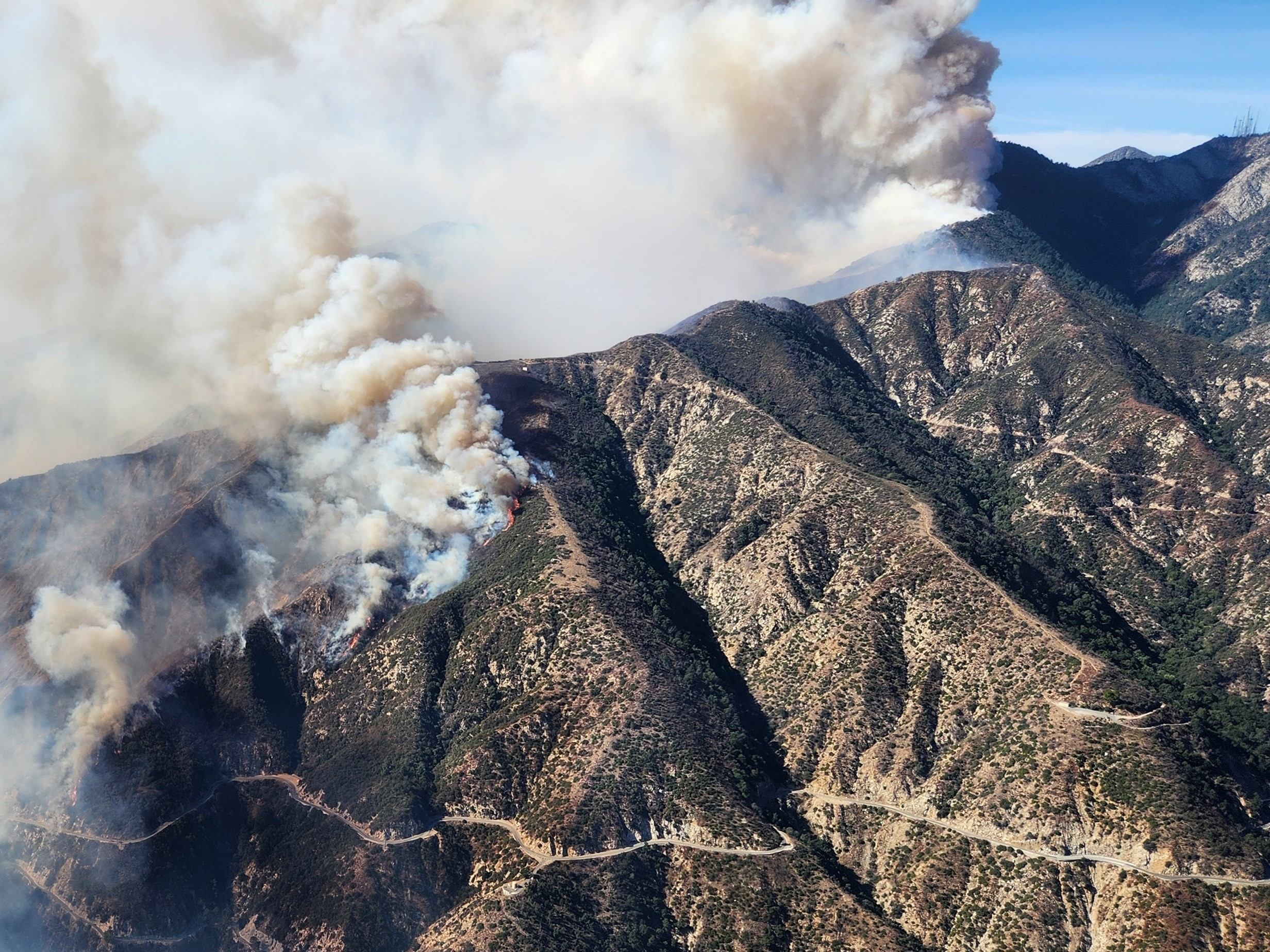
- Aerial photo of the Eaton Fire on the slopes of Mount Wilson on January 8
- Date: January 7 –; January 31, 2025; (25 days)
- Location: Los Angeles County, California, U.S.
- Coordinates: 34.205°N 118.088°W

Statistics
- Status: Extinguished
- Burned area: 14,021 acres (5,674 ha)

Impacts
- Deaths: 19
- Injuries: 8
- Missing people: 22
- Evacuated: 100,000+
- Structures destroyed: 9,418 (1,071 damaged)
- Cost: $27.5 billion (2025 USD)

Ignition
- Cause: Faulty power lines of Southern California Edison

Map
- Interactive perimeter map of Eaton Fire (map data)
- Location of the fire in Greater Los Angeles The location of the fire in southern California

The Eaton Fire was a fatal and destructive wildfire in Los Angeles County, Southern California. The fire began on the evening of January 7, 2025, in Eaton Canyon in the San Gabriel Mountains, and a powerful Santa Ana wind event drove the fire into foothill communities, particularly Altadena. The fire killed 19 people and destroyed more than 9,000 structures, becoming the fifth deadliest and the second most destructive wildfire in California history. The fire was fully contained on January 31. The Department of Justice determined the fire was caused by high voltage power lines operated by electrical utility Southern California Edison, and sued for damages.

The Eaton Fire was one of eight major wildfires in Southern California in January 2025, and burned simultaneously with the deadly and destructive Palisades Fire in the Santa Monica Mountains.

== Background ==
A strong high-pressure system over the Great Basin created a steep northerly pressure gradient across Southern California. The system triggered powerful Santa Ana winds, extremely dry katabatic winds that develop when cooler, dense inland air is funneled through mountain passes and canyons toward the warmer coastal regions.

At the same time, the Southern Coast had experienced "eight months without any measurable rainfall," and much of the region had fallen into moderate drought conditions. The Los Angeles Times quoted a battalion chief for the California Department of Forestry and Fire Protection (Cal Fire) saying that the conditions were "the perfect recipe for a large wildfire". The National Weather Service (NWS) forecast office in Los Angeles/Oxnard issued red flag warnings on the morning of Monday, January 6, effective through the following Thursday evening, for regions that included the Malibu coast, Santa Monica Mountains Recreational Area, and the San Gabriel, San Fernando, and Santa Clarita valleys.

The warnings called for a "particularly dangerous situation" in parts of Los Angeles and Ventura counties resulting from a "life-threatening" windstorm, with Santa Ana wind gusts forecast to reach 60–80 miles per hour (97–129 km/h), with some peak gusts of 90 mph (140 km/h) in mountainous areas. The NWS cautioned that "If fire ignition occurs, conditions are favorable for very rapid fire spread and extreme fire behavior, including long range spotting, which would threaten life and property...". Residents were urged to "use extreme caution with anything that can spark a wildfire" and for those near forests to be prepared to evacuate.

== Progression ==
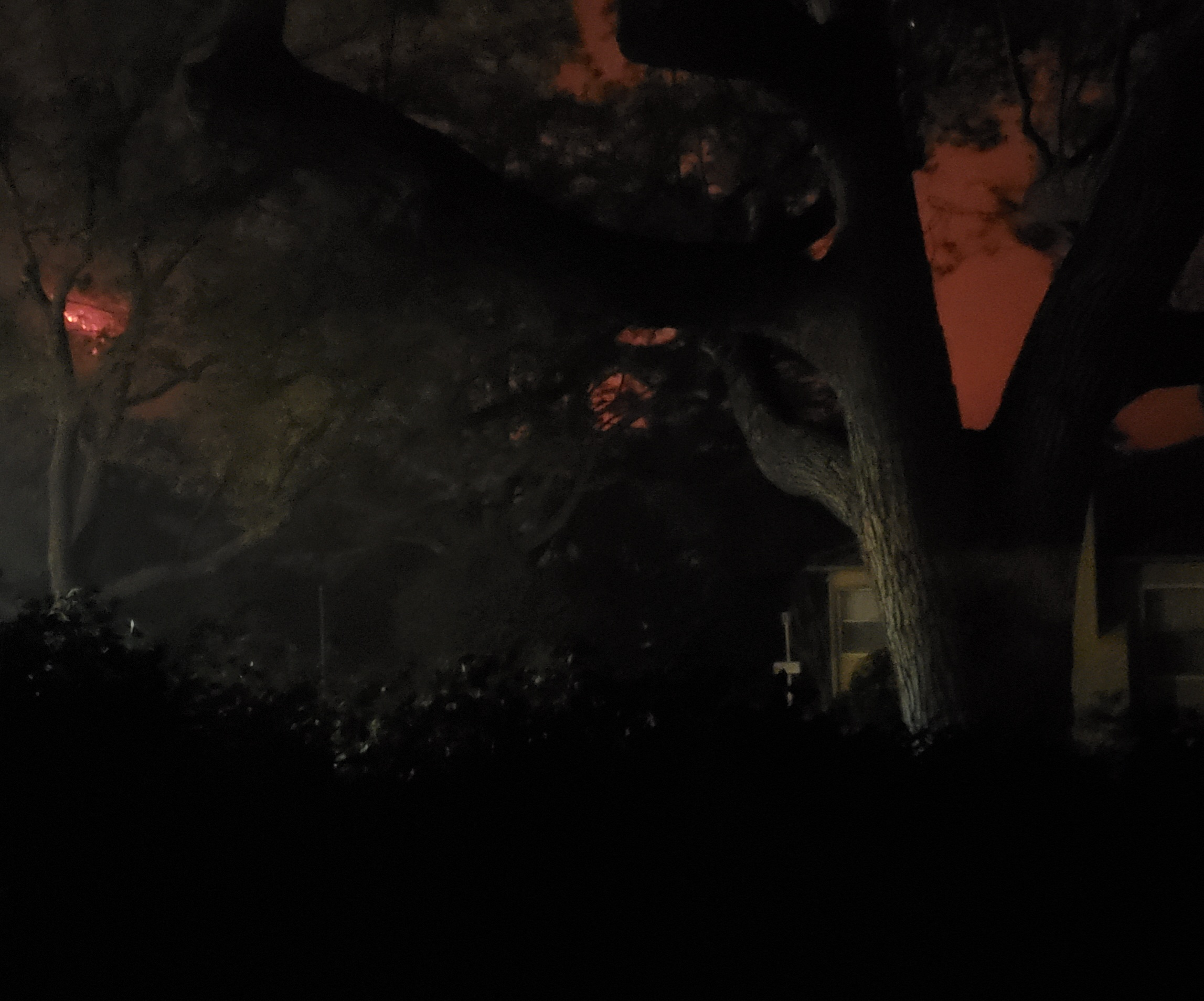
The Eaton Fire as it encroached upon Pasadena's northern limits at the East Washington Village area about six and half hours after the fire started

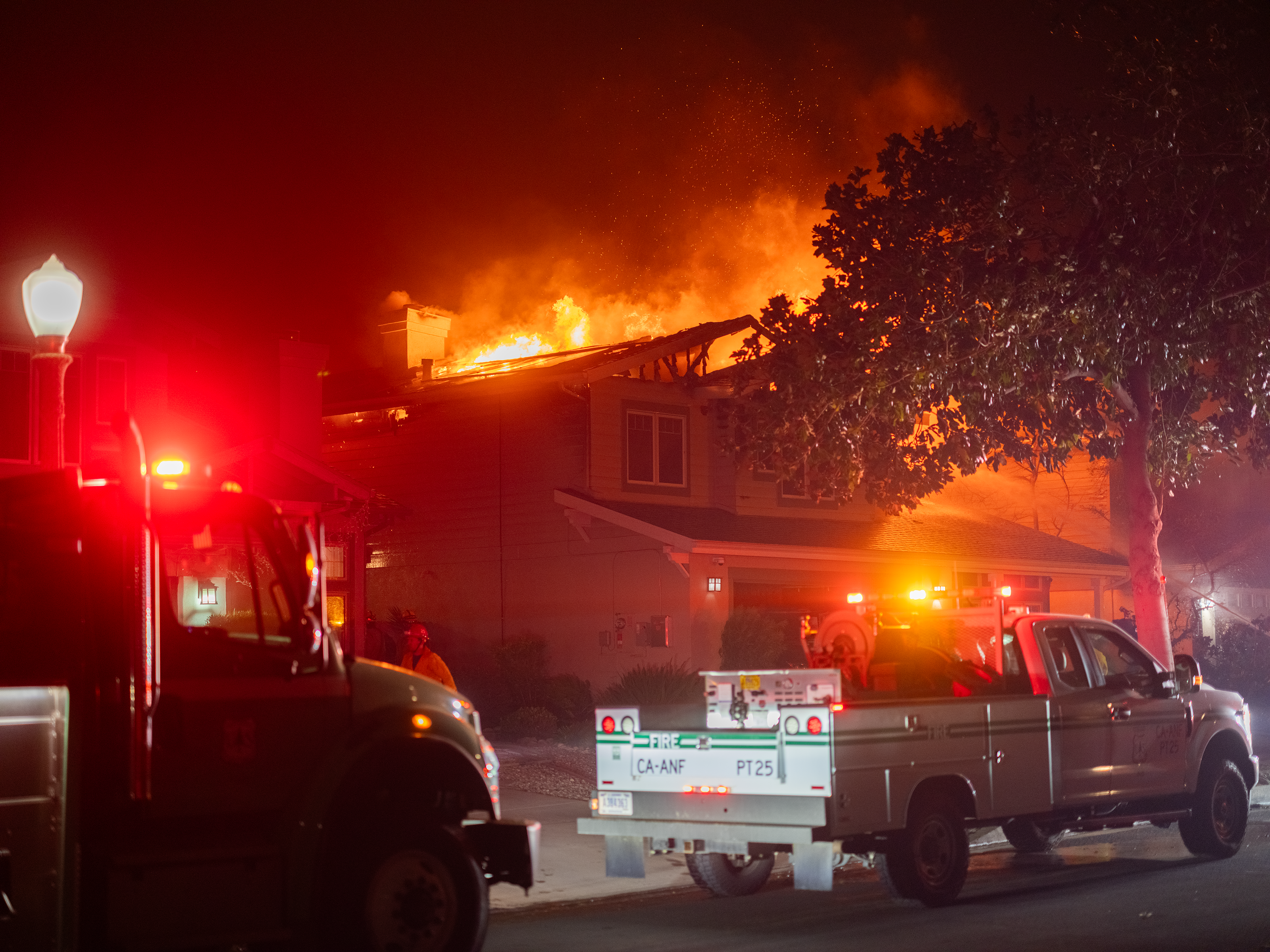
Angeles National Forest firefighters during initial attack of the Eaton Fire

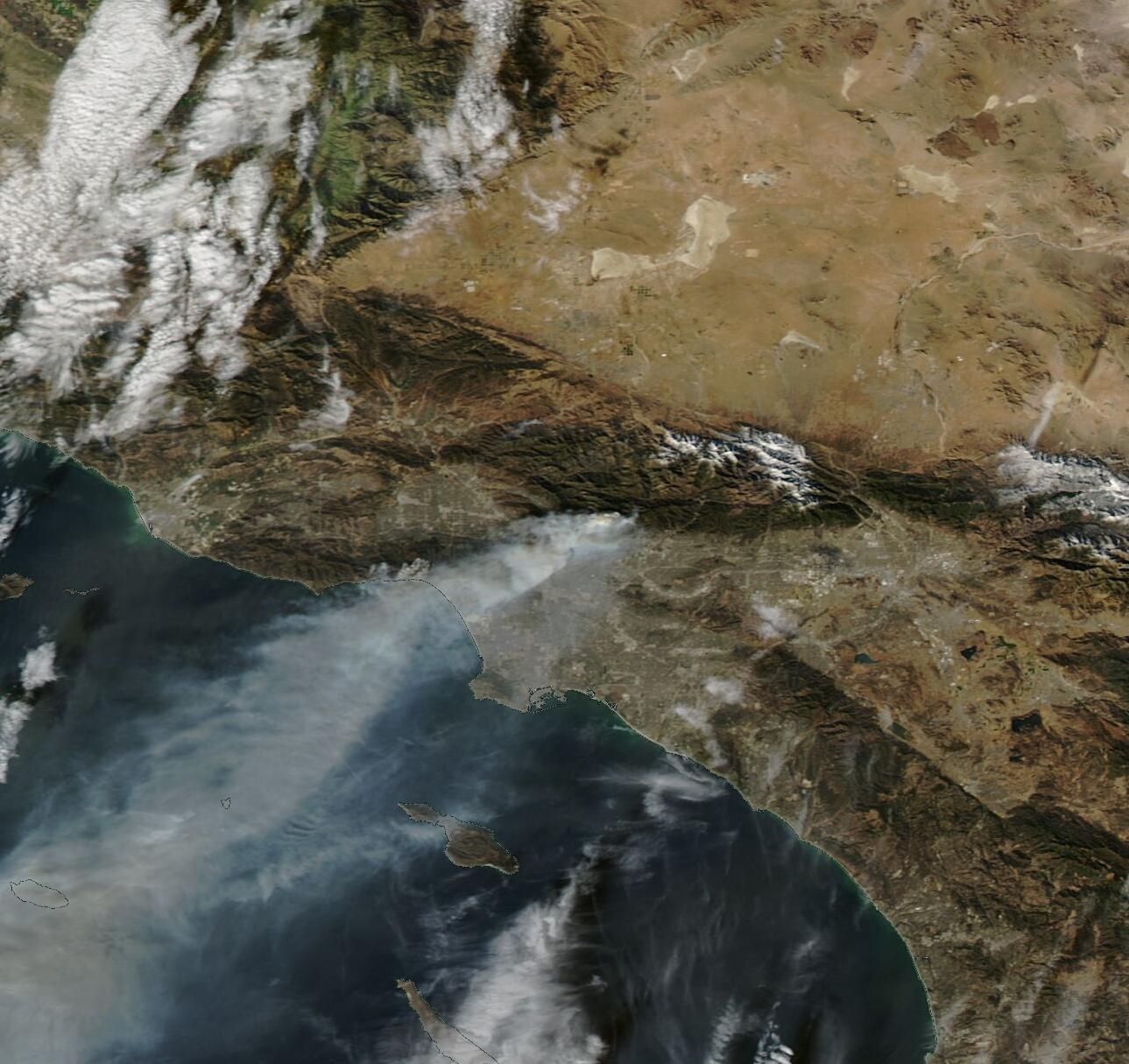
Smoke from the fire on January 8, with smoke from the Palisades Fire to the southwest

The fire began on January 7, 2025, at around 6:18 p.m. PST on the eastern hillside above Eaton Canyon Wash, across the wash from the intersection of Altadena Drive and Canyon Close Drive. By 6:26 p.m., firefighters on Canyon Close Road in Pasadena reported via radio that the fire had spread to 10 acres (4.0 ha) and was burning beneath high-tension power lines. By 6:33 p.m., firefighters there were reporting flying embers, which were setting structures on fire nearly one mile (1.6 km) distant.

Three night-flying helicopters with the Los Angeles County Fire Department (LACoFD) received orders to head to the Eaton Fire at 6:23 p.m. and arrived at about 6:36 p.m., 18 minutes after the fire was reported. They intended to drop water on the fire but, buffeted by ferocious updrafts and downdrafts, aborted the operation at 6:45 p.m. One helicopter crew remained on the scene for 39 more minutes to advise ground crews on the spread of the fire.

The fire rapidly expanded to over 1,000 acres (400 ha) by 12:07 a.m., fueled by the strong Santa Ana winds out of the northeast. Wind gusts up to 100 mph (160 km/h) were reported at the nearby Mount Lukens Truck Trail north of La Cañada Flintridge. By 6:30 a.m. on January 8, the fire had grown to over 2,227 acres (901 ha), with 0% containment. The fire continued to grow quickly, and by 10:36 a.m. was over 10,600 acres (4,300 ha) in area, remaining 0% contained. In the afternoon on January 9, the fire began to approach Mount Wilson.

By 8:49 a.m. on January 12, authorities announced the fire was 27% contained. As of 7:00 am the next day, 3,408 firefighting personnel had been assigned, along with 16 helicopters, 375 engines, 29 bulldozers, 50 crews, and 90 water tenders.

The fire reached 55% containment on January 16 at 5:52 a.m. with about 14,117 acres burned. Two days later on January 18 at 6:26 a.m., Cal Fire announced 73% containment. The fire was finally fully contained after 24 days, on January 31.

== Cause ==
Cal Fire began an investigation into the cause of the fire before it was out, which as of September 2025, was still underway. Residents of a home abutting Eaton Canyon who were among the first people to report the fire to authorities told Pasadena Now that the fire began in proximity to electrical transmission towers above the canyon. Residents affected by the fire later sued public utility Southern California Edison, alleging that eyewitnesses had observed faulty power lines and that the company failed to de-energize transmission lines despite a red flag warning issued by the National Weather Service. This alleged cause is based on photogrammetry analysis of multiple CCTV and witness videos by Sunridge law group's "LA fire justice", led by Mikal Watts. It has been reported that the power lines suspected to have caused the fire were overdue for repair.

In September 2025, the United States Department of Justice sued Southern California Edison for costs of containment and land restoration, claiming that the public utility company was at fault for the fire.

== Impact ==
=== Casualties ===
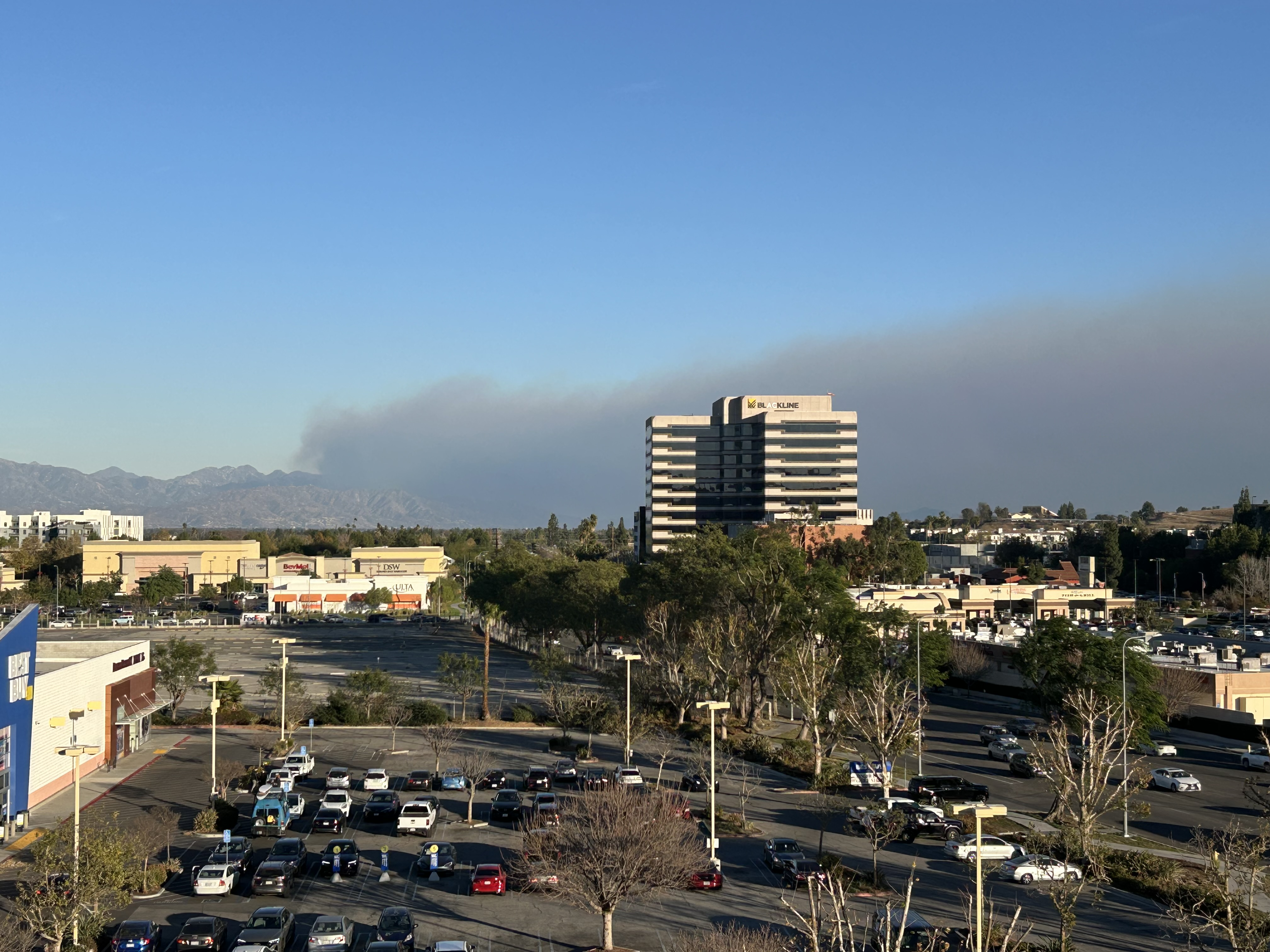
The Eaton Fire from Woodland Hills in Los Angeles

As of July 22, 2025, the death toll from the Eaton Fire included 19 people with 22 people missing. All but 1 of the 19 victims confirmed dead lived west of Lake Avenue, the predominately black neighborhood in Altadena that received emergency evacuation orders hours after those in east Altadena.

=== Evacuations and closures ===
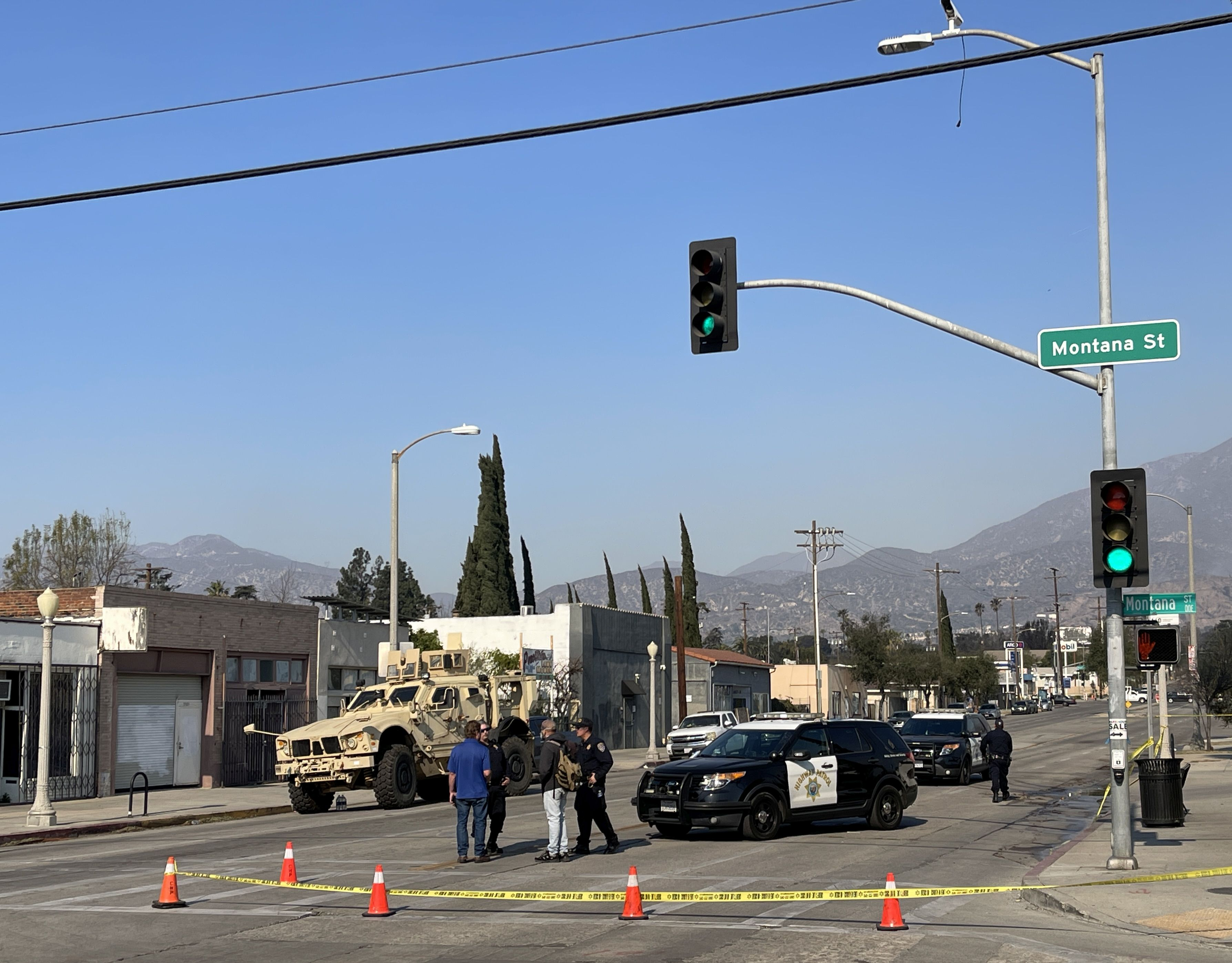
California Highway Patrol and the National Guard just south of Altadena, January 10

As of 4 a.m. PST on January 8, 52,314 residents and 20,890 structures had been placed under evacuation orders, with a further 46,847 residents and 18,051 structures placed under evacuation warnings. Numerous homes and cars in Altadena were destroyed; up to "90 to 95 percent" of Altadena residents had been evacuated as of 7 a.m. One report shows west Altadena received emergency evacuation orders at 3 a.m., hours after residents in East Altadena did. On January 8, the estimated number of evacuees increased to over 100,000. By the afternoon of January 8, over 100 animals had been received at the Pasadena Humane animal shelter, many of which had received burn injuries.

The fire and the resulting firefighting efforts contaminated the water supply of neighborhoods served by the Pasadena Water and Power Department and the Foothill Municipal Water District.

The Pasadena Unified School District, the Los Angeles Unified School District, and 23 other surrounding school districts announced the closure of all schools in those districts for Wednesday, January 8 in response to the fire. Closures for January 8 were also announced by Pasadena City College, Fuller Theological Seminary, and the California Institute of Technology. Many of these closures were extended to Thursday, January 9, and Friday, January 10.

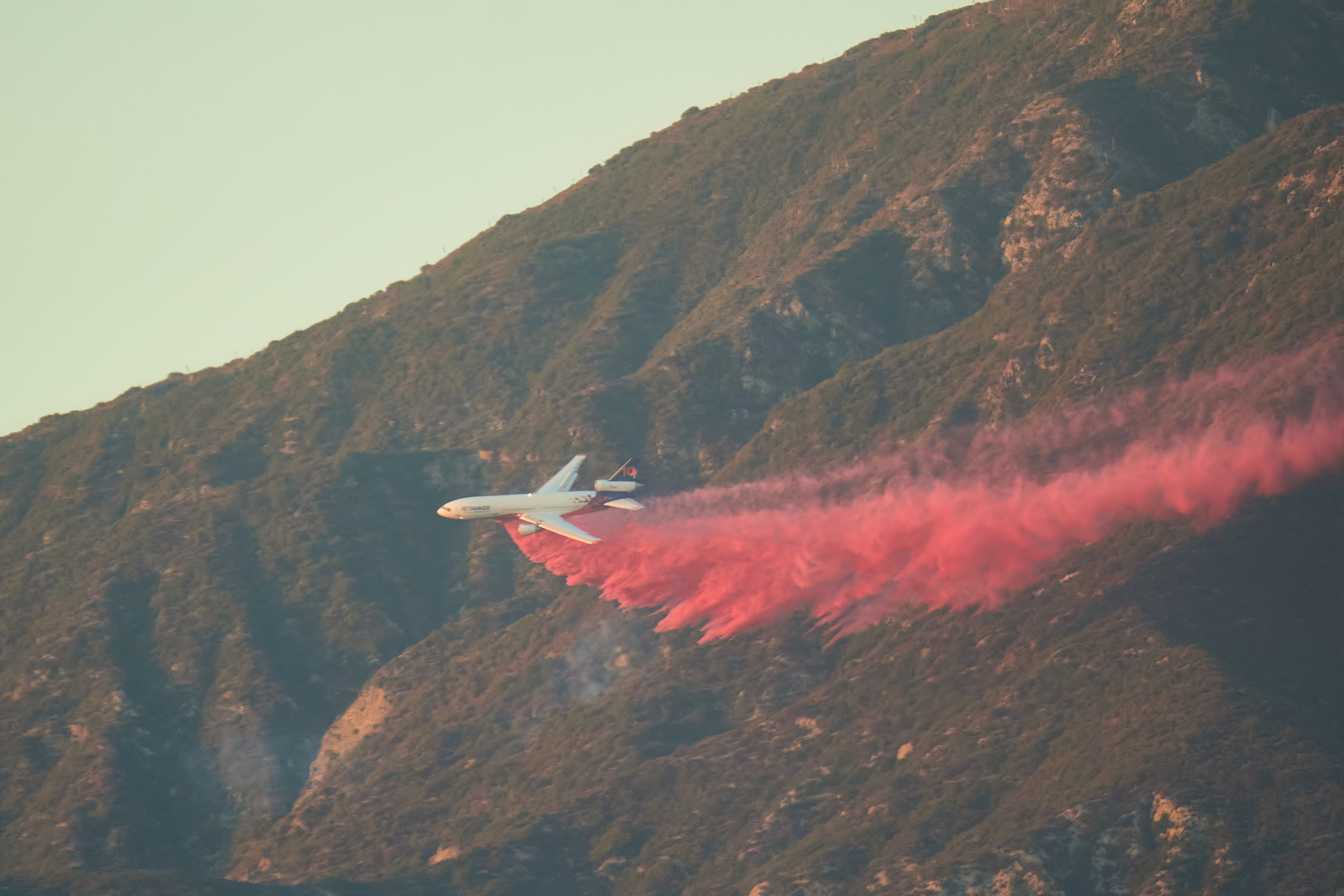
A DC-10 Air Tanker drops fire retardant, January 13

Flames on Mount Wilson may have affected local broadcast signals; Mount Wilson Observatory had to be evacuated. Local broadcasters KLOS-FM, KABC-TV, and PBS SoCal temporarily lost over-the-air signals on January 9. The Jet Propulsion Laboratory was evacuated and operations for the NASA Deep Space Network were moved to an offsite back-up command center.

By January 10, a 6:00 p.m. to 6:00 a.m. curfew was implemented for the evacuated areas of Altadena and roadblocks into the area were put in place by the California National Guard.

=== Response ===
Beginning on January 10, thousands of volunteers and donators convened at the parking lot of Santa Anita Park to assist those displaced and impacted by the fire.

Misinformation on social media regarding the fire spread was common. For instance, CalFire reported that misinformation circulating on Facebook falsely claiming individuals could come to California to join clean up crews.

=== Environmental impacts and flooding ===
The Eaton Fire left large stretches of land without vegetation, leaving soil vulnerable to landslides during period of strong rainfall. In mid-November 2025, approximately 23 million people across California were under flood or flash flood watches; several communities across Southern California near the Palisades and Eaton fires were placed under such watches, including Altadena.

== Structures destroyed ==
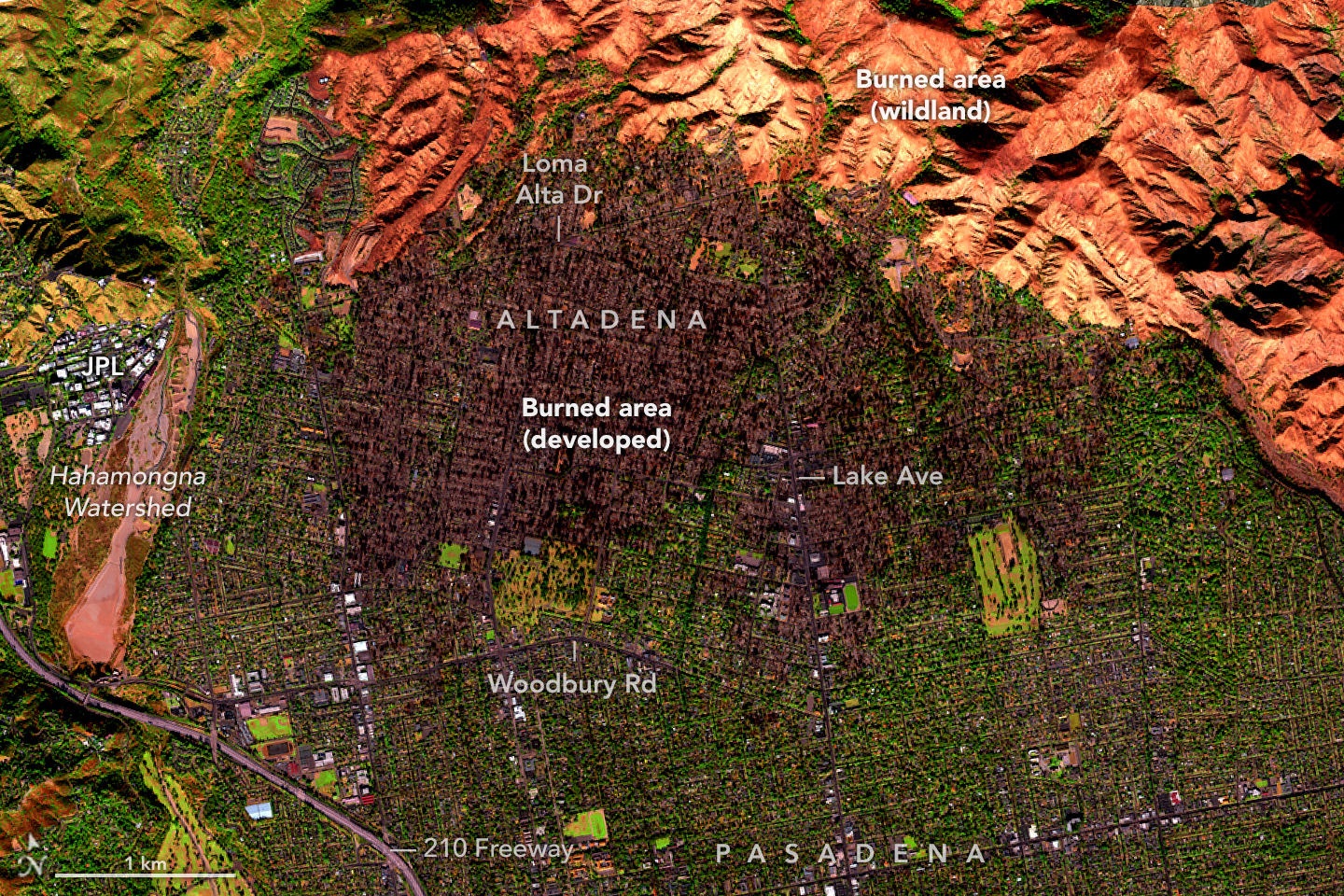
A false-color image showing areas burned by the Eaton Fire, captured by NASA's AVIRIS-3

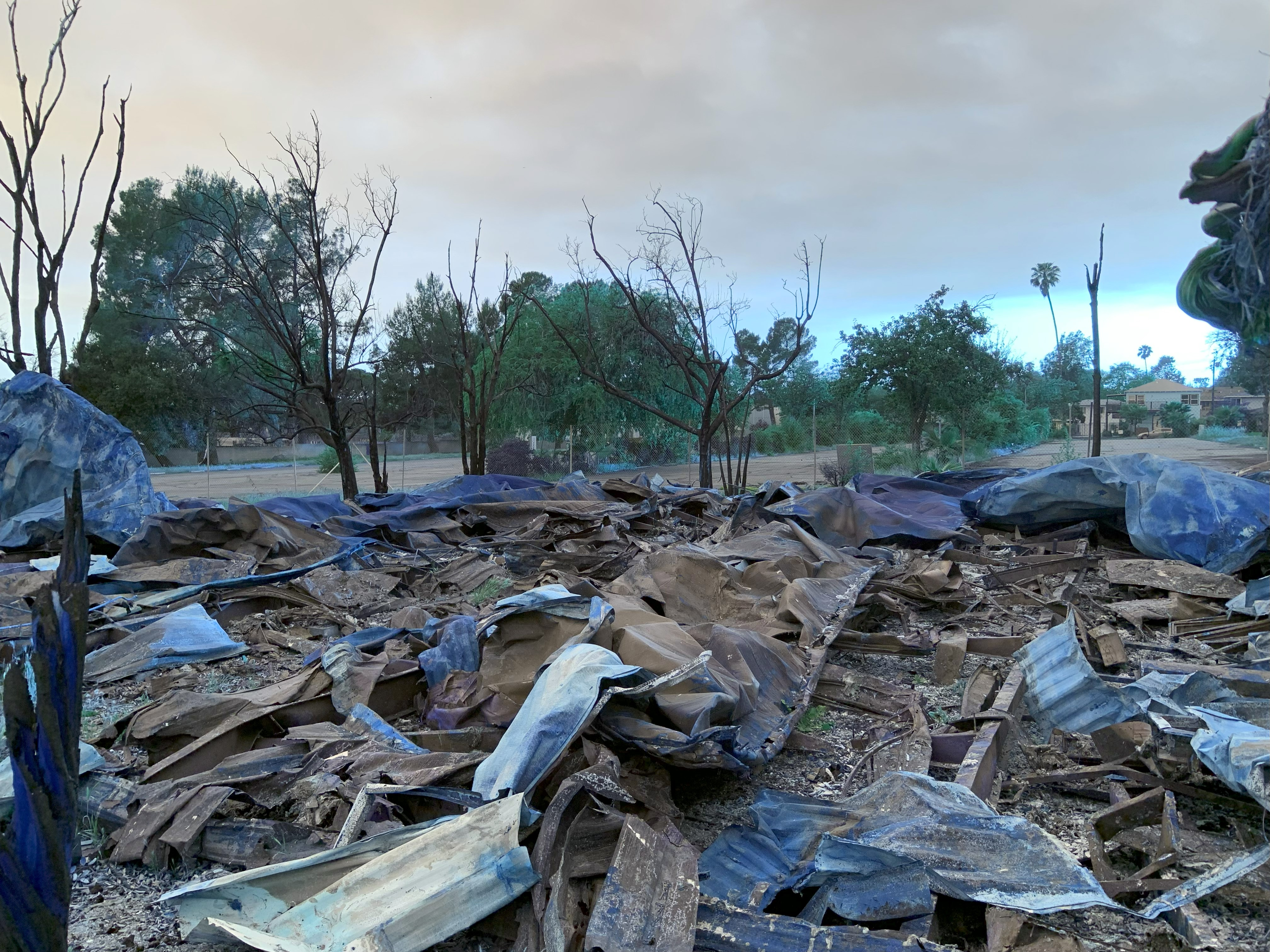
Destroyed exterior buildings at the abandoned St. Luke's Medical Center following the fires

The number of destroyed structures was reported as at least 7,500 as of January 16, including 4,356 single-family homes, 77 multi-family buildings and 123 commercial buildings. The number of structures destroyed was updated to 9,418, with an additional 1,071 structures damaged, as of January 21. The fire destroyed residential sections of Altadena which were settled by African-Americans who moved west in the 1920s and 1930s, during the Great Migration, and had created a working and middle-class neighborhood that had persisted for over a century. The fire destroyed nearly half of all Black households in Altadena.

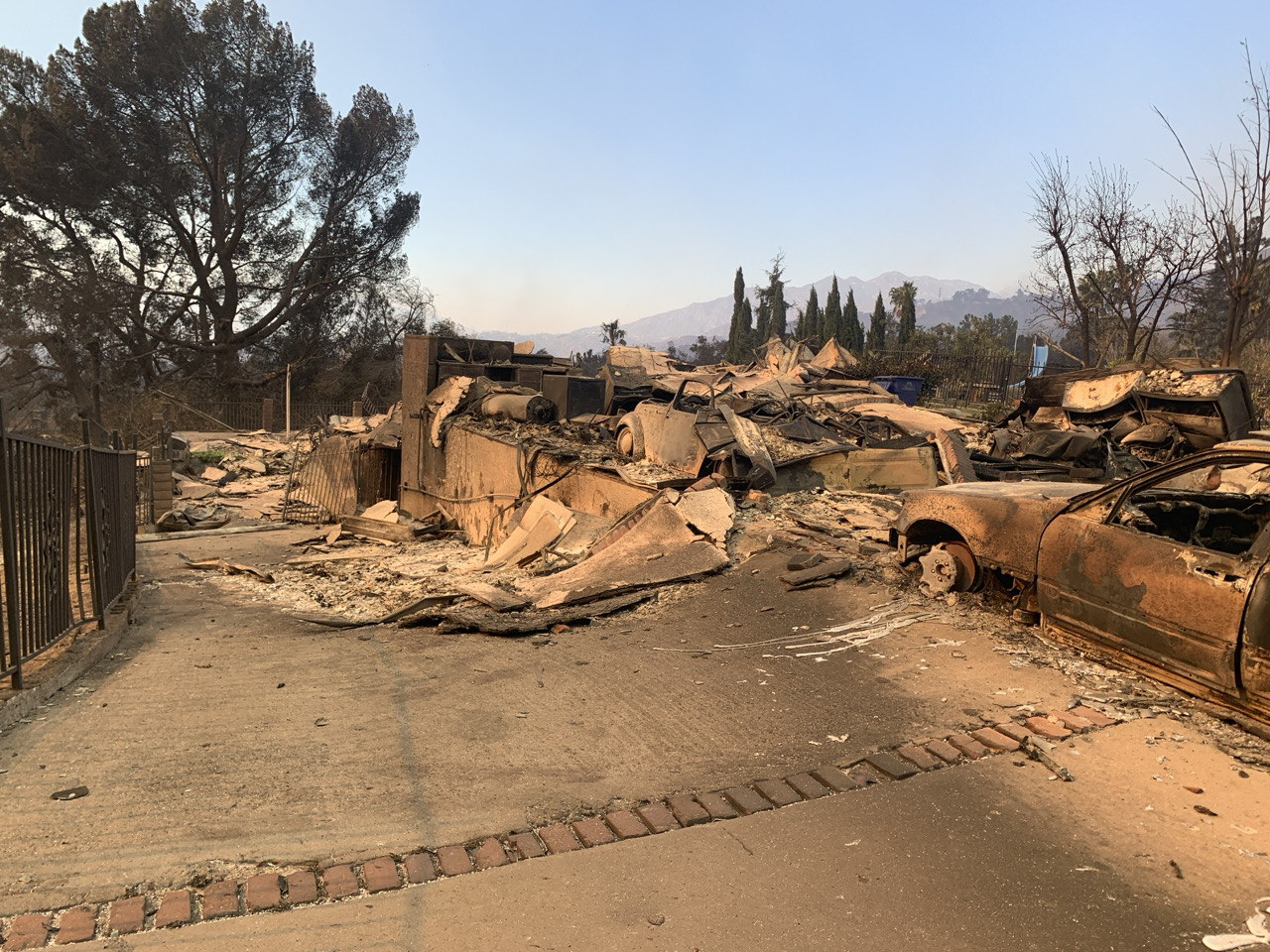
A destroyed home and vehicle in northern Altadena

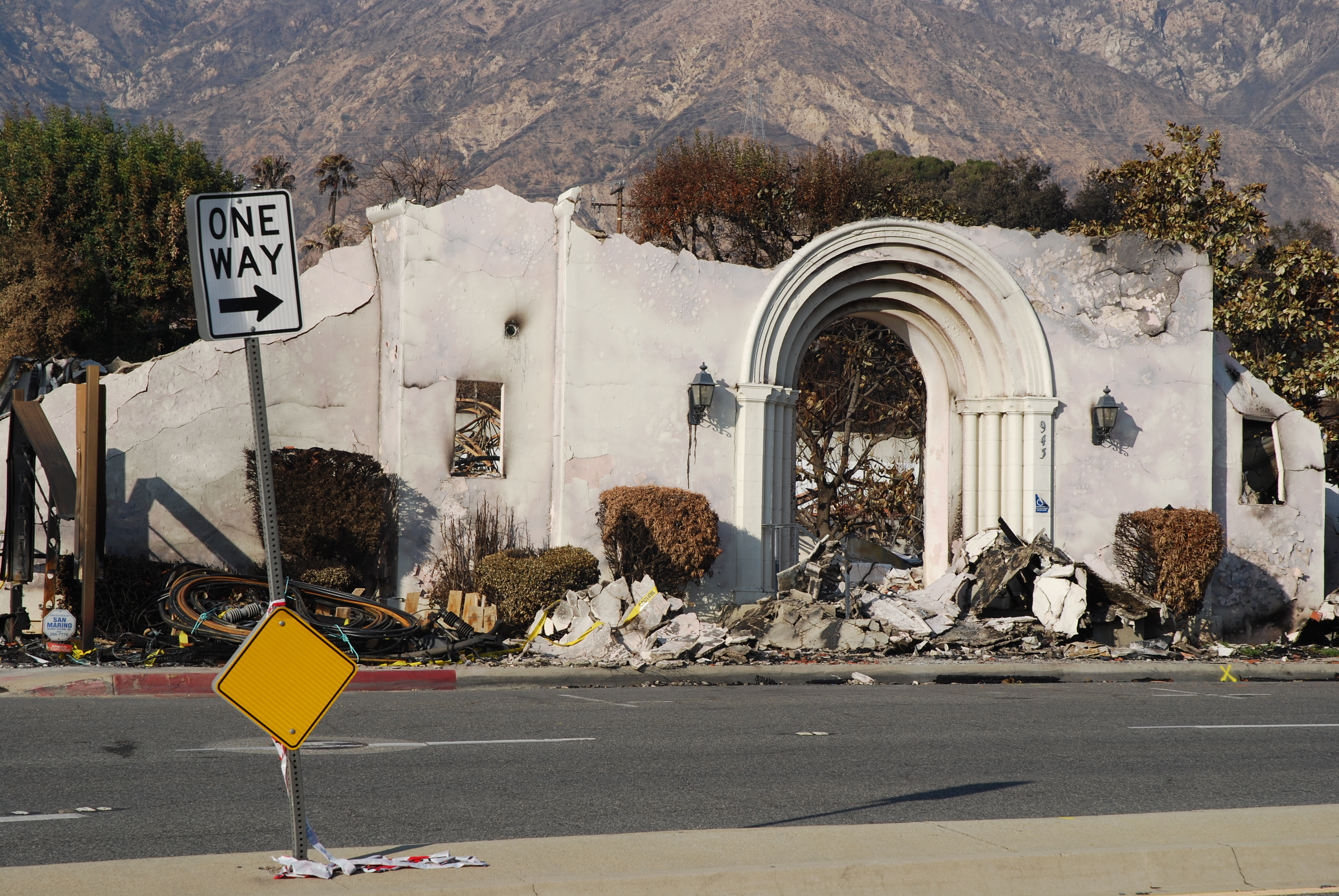
The ruins of Altadena Community Church

=== Popular structures and landmarks destroyed ===
Among the historic or culturally significant structures destroyed are:

- Altadena Community Garden
- Altadena Community Church
- Altadena Golf Course Clubhouse
- Altadena Hardware, an 80-year-old store
- Altadena Town & Country Club
- Andrew McNally House
- Aveson School of Leaders Charter School (previously Noyes Elementary)
- Bunny Museum
- Eaton Canyon Nature Center, Eaton Canyon Natural Area Park
- Farnsworth Park
- Fox's Restaurant
- Holmes House
- Jane's Cottage/Jane's Village
- Little Red Hen Coffee Shop
- Masjid Al-Taqwa Mosque
- Nature Friends Clubhouse in Sierra Madre
- Odyssey Charter School - South
- Oh Happy Day Vegan Cafe
- Park Planned Homes, a 1940s development by Gregory Ain that was one of the first Modernist housing developments in the United States
- Pasadena Church of Christ
- Pasadena Jewish Temple and Center
- Pasadena Waldorf School, including Scripps Hall
- Pauline Lowe Residence, a Modernist house by Harwell Hamilton Harris
- Sahag-Mesrob Armenian Christian School
- Saint Mark's School (except for preschool)
- St. Luke Medical Center (external buildings only)
- St. Mark's Episcopal Church
- Straub House, residence of architect Calvin Straub
- Theosophical Library Center
- The Terraces at Park Marino Senior Living Complex
- William D. Davies Memorial Building at Charles S. Farnsworth Park
- Zane Grey Estate
- Zorthian Ranch

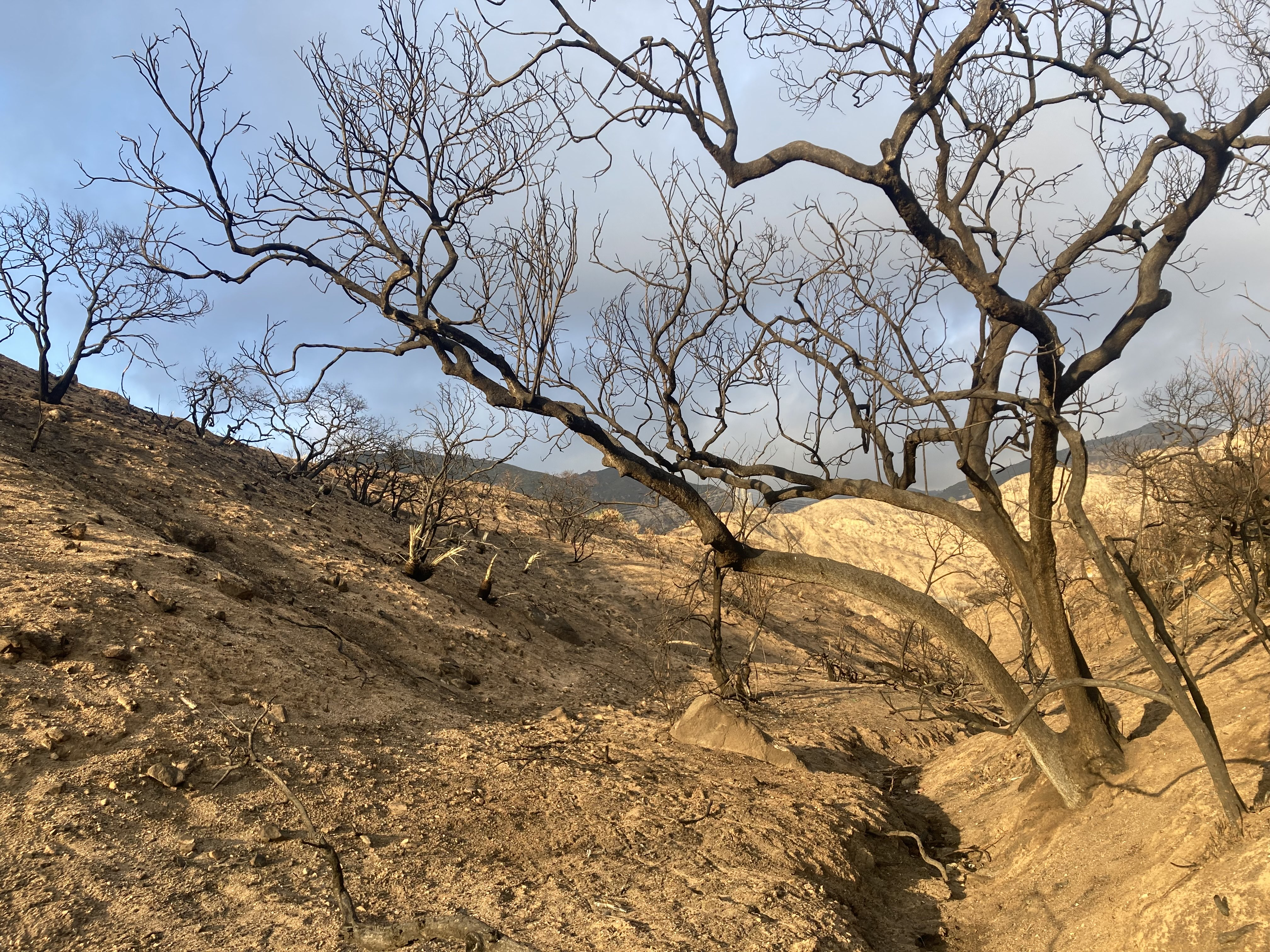
Burned chaparral on the outskirts of Altadena on February 11, approximately one month after the fire

=== Cleanup ===
LA County Public Works Department, the Environmental Protection Agency, and the Army Corps of Engineers are responsible for the debris clean up effort. Altadena Green is a group of locals trying to preserve as many trees as possible in the affected area, as Phase 2 of the debris cleanup may threaten to taken down trees that could otherwise be saved.

== Aftermath ==
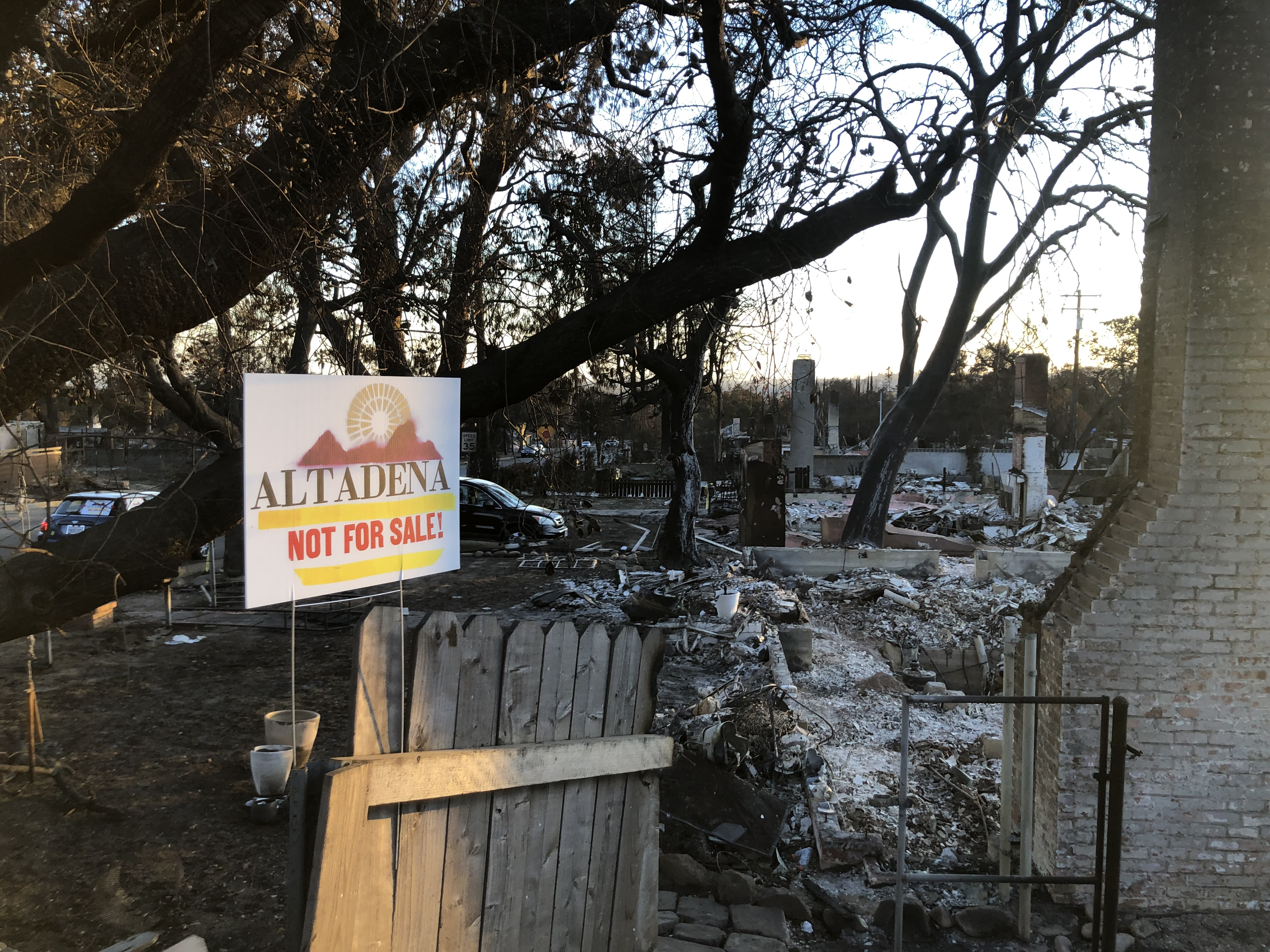
Altadena Not for Sale community group's yard sign at burnt out property

As the community of Altadena recovered from the Eaton Fire, rebuild and relief efforts began. Community centered groups like Altadena Not for Sale and Altagether, as well as the Altadena Collective and other coalitions formed in an effort to keep outside land speculators at bay and support Altadenans to restore their community. Community Land Trust efforts also got underway.

== Litigation ==
On January 13, 2025, four lawsuits were filed against Southern California Edison (SCE), alleging that the company had "violated public safety and utility codes and was negligent in its handling of power safety shut-offs" during the fire weather event, according to NPR. On January 16, the family of an Eaton Fire victim sued SCE for wrongful death, also alleging negligence in SCE's failure to deactivate utilities. On January 17, Nadrich Law Corporation filed a lawsuit against SCE on behalf of four households whose residences were destroyed in the Eaton Fire. On March 5, Los Angeles County, Pasadena and the City of Sierra Madre filed a lawsuit against SCE, seeking compensation for losses caused by the fire. In September 2025, the U.S. Department of Justice sued Southern California Edison, claiming that the public utility company was at fault for the fire.

In July 2025, Southern California Edison announced the establishment of a Wildfire Recovery Compensation Program to provide voluntary, expedited payments to individuals and businesses affected by the Eaton Fire in exchange for limiting or waiving their right to sue the utility. The program covers claims related to property destruction, smoke and ash damage, business interruption, personal injury, and wrongful death, and explicitly states that participation does not constitute an admission of liability by the company. Edison described the initiative as a way to help victims rebuild more quickly and avoid lengthy litigation. However, critics, including residents and attorneys representing fire survivors, have argued that the proposed payouts may undervalue actual damages and pressure participants to accept reduced settlements in lieu of pursuing full legal claims.

Community groups and attorneys representing Eaton Fire survivors criticized the proposed compensation framework, arguing that it excluded many affected households from eligibility and undervalued losses relative to insurance shortfalls and market rates. Some residents and advocacy organizations proposed a countermeasure known as the “Fix What You Broke” amendment, which called for expanded eligibility maps, higher base payouts, and non-economic damages for trauma and displacement. Under the amendment, adult residents affected by smoke and soot would receive $20,000 each, children $5,000, and families of deceased victims up to $1.5 million per individual, with additional benefits for surviving spouses. Critics contended that the utility’s program, by requiring participants to waive further litigation, limited victims’ leverage in seeking full accountability for the disaster’s causes and aftermath.

In an April 2026 article, Los Angeles Times state that Southern California Edison is employing aggressive legal tactics, including attorney-client privilege claims and protective orders, to withhold internal investigation data regarding the devastating Eaton Fire. Critics and victims' attorneys argue that these methods conceal safety failures and prevent public knowledge.

== Growth and containment table ==
| Date | Acres Burned | Containment | Citation |
|---|---|---|---|
| January 7 | 400 | | |
| January 8 | 10,600 | | |
| January 9 | 13,690 | | |
| January 10 | 14,117 | | |
| January 11 | 14,117 | | |
| January 12 | 14,117 | | |
| January 13 | 14,117 | | |
| January 14 | 14,117 | | |
| January 15 | 14,117 | | |
| January 16 | 14,117 | | |
| January 17 | 14,117 | | |
| January 18 | 14,117 | | |
| January 19 | 14,021 | | |
| January 20 | 14,021 | | |
| January 21 | 14,021 | | |
| January 22 | 14,021 | | |
| January 23 | 14,021 | | |
| January 24 | 14,021 | | |
| January 25 | 14,021 | | |
| January 26 | 14,021 | | |
| January 27 | 14,021 | | |
| January 28 | 14,021 | | |
| January 29 | 14,021 | | |
| January 30 | 14,021 | | |
| January 31 | 14,021 | | |

== See also ==
- January 2025 Southern California wildfires
  - Palisades Fire
- Kinneloa Fire, a destructive wildfire in the same location in 1993
