= Scripps Hall =

Scripps Hall could refer to:

- Scripps Hall (California) located in Altadena, California
- E. W. Scripps Hall located in Athens, Ohio, home of the E. W. Scripps School of Journalism at Ohio University
