= Alex Amen =

American singer-songwriter

Alex Amen is an American folk musician from Texas.

He is described by his record label ATO as "an artist untethered from time and place". After taking up piano at four (and studying with the same jazz pianist through the end of high school), Amen started playing guitar in mid-adolescence after discovering the likes of Nirvana and Neil Young. Aged eighteen, Alex moved to California with the purpose of enrolling himself in film school, aiming to make documentaries about rock climbing; one of his lifelong passions.After one semester in film school, he dropped out to focus on music full-time and, within weeks, he immersed himself in the countercultural spirit of the Dittman Family Commune, in Anaheim. It was there where he formed his first band, a psychedelic folk-rock outfit named "American Slang" in 2017.

"The commune was a crazy place to live — there were hippies, and punks, and skaters; all in this beautiful house that used to be on six acres of strawberry fields, but now it's surrounded by strip malls", says Alex. "The house was owned by a professor who’d bought it in the mid-’60s and still lived there with his family, so it had this fascinating history with the anti-war movement and renowned civil-rights/psychedelic activists from that time. We’d have these big communal meals every day and debate art, and God, and food, and politics. It was a pretty amazing place to live for a while.”

As a result of the band breaking up, Alex moved from Southern California to Vashon, an island in the Puget Sound of Washington State. The next three years he spent in relative isolation, taking up various interests in mycology, mountaineering, poetry, and wooden boat building.

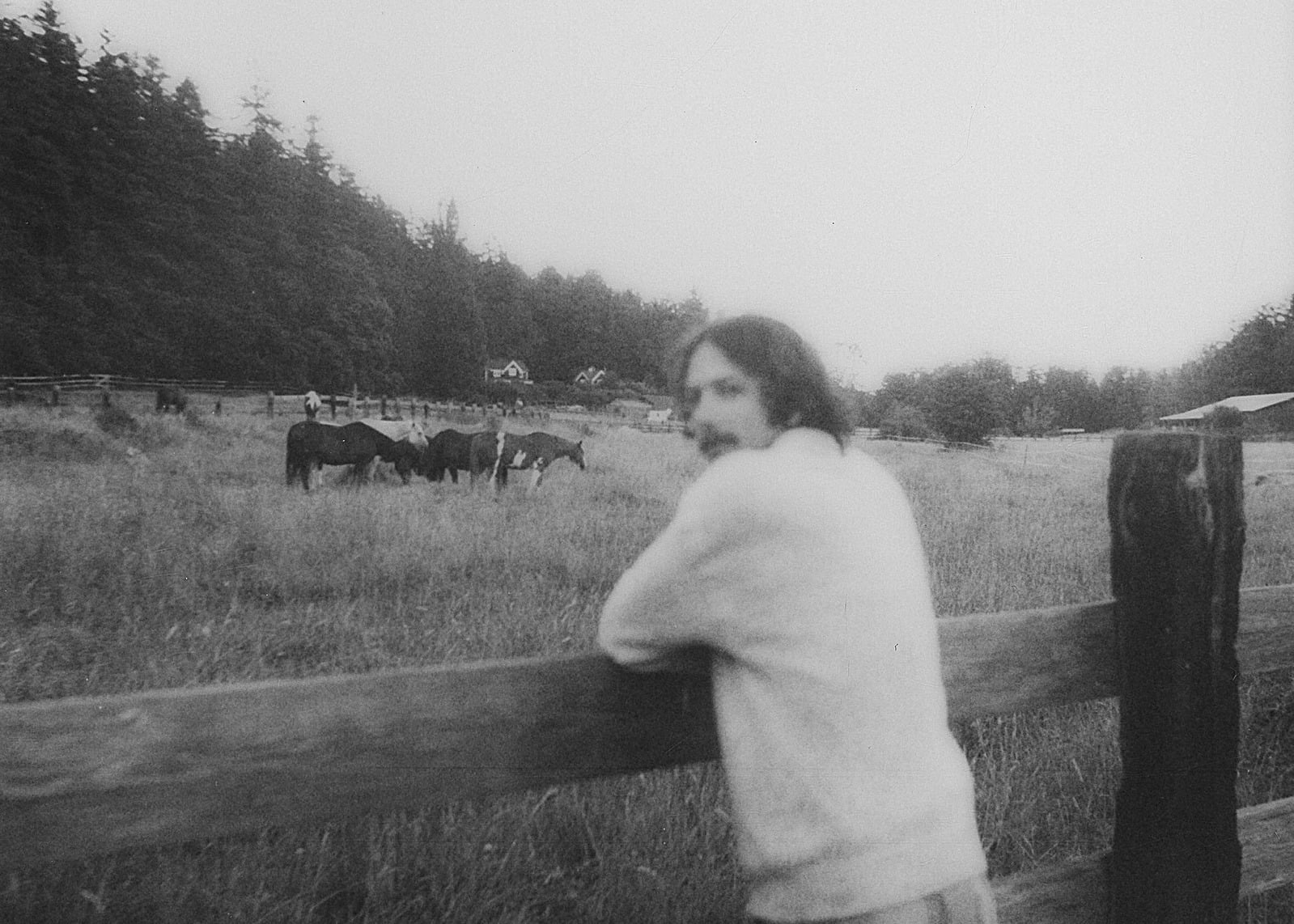
Alex Amen at the historic Zorthian Ranch, California.

With the passing of the years, Amen felt the increasing need to go back to California to pursue music.

In January of 2023, he self-produced his first EP: "The Zorthian Tapes" in a self-built studio at the historic Zorthian Ranch in Altadena. The Zorthian Tapes was later released in June 2025.

His debut album, Sun of Amen, released in June 2026 on ATO Records, was partly recorded at the legendary Valentine Recording Studios in Los Angeles, mostly using equipment older than Alex himself. The album is described by Maeri Ferguson as having "the clear-throated moan of early-career Harry Nilsson, the wistfulness of John Denver, and the sneaky heartfelt melodies of Jim Croce", and depicted by Ian C. Rothery with the words "His unashamed retro vibe is so out there you almost feel that he is unaware that he is channelling the past – it’s just who he is."

While in the studio recording Sun of Amen, Alex completed a second, forthcoming full-length album.

In the past year, Amen has toured with Folk Bitch Trio, performed at festivals such as Pitchfork London & Paris, Newport Folk, Iceland Airwaves, Austin City Limits (were he was named as an "Artist You Can't Miss"), Outside Lands, and also participated in the Americana Music Association's annual Grammy Eve concert at the Troubadour to honor Neil Young.

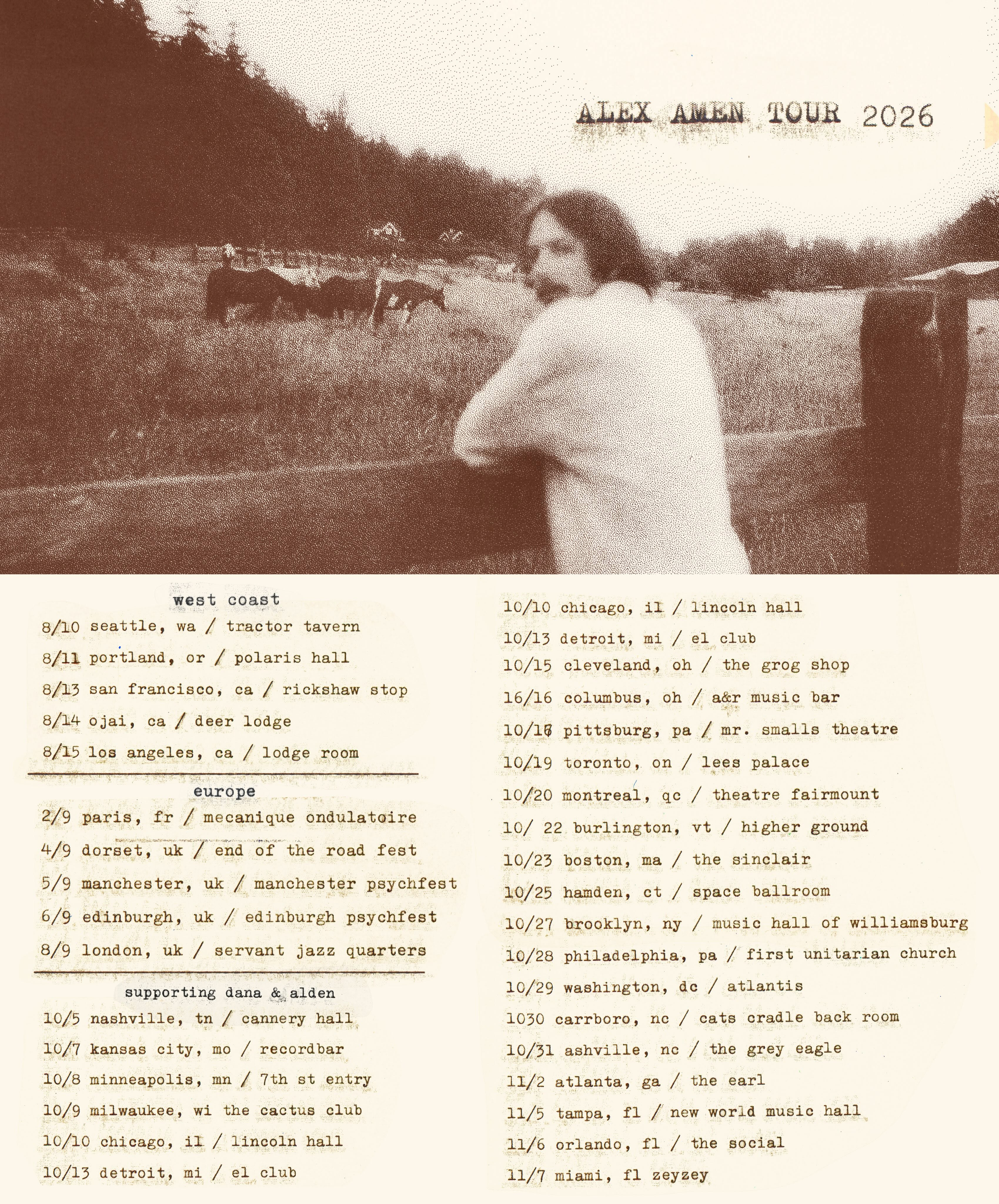
Alex Amen's 2026 Tour Poster

In 2026, Alex embarked on an international tour that included performances across the United States, Canada, and Europe. The first leg, billed as the West Coast leg, becan on August 10 in Seattle, with a performance at Tractor Tavern, and continued through Portland, San Francisco, Ojai, and Los Angeles throughout August. The tour continued in Europe, with performances in Paris, Dorset, Manchester, Edinburgh, and London between September 2 and 8.

Beginning in October, Amen returned to North America for a series of performances supporting Dana and Alden. The North American leg began on October 5 in Nashville, and continued through cities including Kansas City, Minneapolis, Milwaukee, Chicago, Detroit, Cleveland, Colombus, Pittsburgh, Toronto, and Montreal. Later in October, the tour carried on through Burlington, Boston, Hamden, Brooklyn, Philadelphia, and Washington, as well as several cities in North Carolina. The november leg includes performances in Atlanta, Tampa, Orlando, and Miami. Reaching its end on November 7th, 2026.

== Discography ==
=== Studio albums ===
- Sun of Amen (2026)

=== Extended plays ===
- The Zorthian Tapes (2025)
