= Roberta H. Martinez =

American writer (born 1952)

- Born: June 18, 1952 (age 74); Los Angeles, California, U.S.
- Occupations: Independent consultant and researcher
- Writing career
- Notable work: Latinos in Pasadena
- Notable awards: YWCA – Woman of Excellence, Adam Schiff, 29th Congressional District, Woman Of The Year, Western States Region of the Alliance for Community Media Award and the City of Pasadena, Human Relations Commission, Harry Sheldon Award, The Pasadena Magazine, The 50 Fabulous Women of Influence.
- Website: robertamartinez.com/Site/Welcome.html

Roberta H. Martinez (born June 18, 1952) is an American writer. She is probably best known for her 2009 book, Latinos in Pasadena.

== Early life and education ==
Martinez was born in Los Angeles, California. She was delivered by a Chinese doctor in what is known as Chinatown at the (then) French Hospital. She was raised in East Los Angeles, California by her parents. Her parents married at an older age and she is an only child. Martinez received her early education in the Los Angeles Unified School District. She attended Eastman Avenue Elementary School, Robert Louis Stevenson Jr. High School, and Garfield High School. She attended High School during the Chicano movement that occurred in the 1960s, otherwise known as the Civil Rights Era. She graduated from high school in January 1970. Her academic performance was not great, but that did not dismantle her love for education. Martinez still had aspirations in pursuing higher education due to her parents’ strong educational values and influences. Her parents always encouraged her to be an independent and brave woman. Her teachers also had an impact in her life due to the fact that they were supportive and dedicated to their profession. Martinez's early life provided many experiences that influenced her work as a community activist. Later on, Martinez attended East Los Angeles Community College. From there, she transferred to University of California, Riverside. She graduated with a Bachelor of Music in 1980, and in 1984 she received a master's degree in Music and History.

== Work experience ==
Community activities:

- Organization affiliations/Committee participation
  - Adelante Mujer Latina, Advisory Committee
  - City of Pasadena, Civic Center Public Art, Advisory Committee
  - City of Pasadena, Pasadena Community Access Corporation, Producer's Committee
  - Latino Heritage, Executive Director and Founder
  - Leadership Pasadena, Alumna
  - Pasadena City College, President's Latino Advisory Committee
  - Pasadena Digital History Collaborative, Advisory Committee
  - Pasadena Museum of History, Family Stories Exhibit, Advisory Committee
  - Pasadena Latino Forum, Founding Member
  - Pasadena Northwest Renaissance Committee, Cultural History consultant
  - Pasadena Unified School District, District Task Force, Committee member
  - Southwest Chamber Music, Carlos Chavez Committee, Member
- Facilitator/Teaching experience:
  - Per Diem Facilitator, A World of Difference Program, Anti Defamation League
  - Instructor, Music Introduction, Los Angeles Trade Tech
  - Substitute, elementary & middle schools, Pasadena Unified School District
  - Substitute, private schools in Altadena, Pasadena, Sierra Madre
  - Classroom teacher – Spanish as Second Language, Preschool; St. Mark's Episcopal Day School, Altadena
  - Classroom teacher – Music/Literacy focus, Washington Elementary School, Pasadena Unified School District
- Participation/Presentations
  - ArroyoFest, History of the Arroyo, Event Emcee, Panelist
  - Aztec Stories Project – CD and educational concerts, narration, percussion and vocals
  - Harvest in the Field of Grace – Moderator/Salon Participant
  - Latino Theater Company, Cathedral of Our Lady of the Angels, La Virgen de Tepeyac, coro
  - Leadership Pasadena – Quality of Life Session, Telling our Stories, Lecturer
  - Origins Arts and Culture Festival – U are Here: Roots of the Craftsman style home, panelist
- Author/Writer
  - Arcadia Publishing, Images of America: Latinos in Pasadena, 2009
  - A Pasadena Latina, Blog
  - Pasadena Now/Pasadena Hoy, contributing columnist

== Honors and awards ==
Martinez has received multiple honors and awards throughout her career years.

- YWCA – Woman of Excellence
- Adam Schiff
- 29th Congressional District
- Woman Of The Year
- Western States Region of the Alliance for Community Media Award
- City of Pasadena
- Human Relations Commission
- Harry Sheldon Award
- The 50 Fabulous Women of Influence
- “Pasadena Magazine”

== Personal life ==
She currently lives in Pasadena, California with her husband, James Grimes and with their son, Matthew. She currently serves as the volunteer Executive Director of Latino Heritage, the Chair of the Library Commission of the City of Pasadena, and a board member of the Pasadena Senior Center, serving on the Governance Committee. Martinez has kept a writing blog “A Pasadena Latina” since 2010. She will soon begin writing in one of the Pasadena's newsletter called “Pasadena Now.” She is currently employed as an independent consultant and researcher.
