= Pauline Lowe Residence =

American building

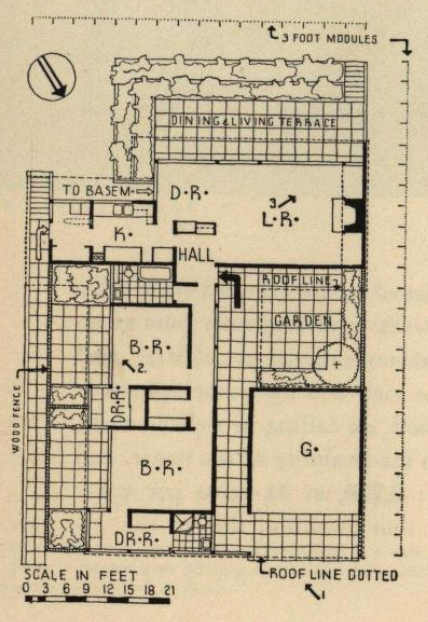
- Floor plan of Pauline Lowe Residence, from a 1934 publication

General information
- Status: Destroyed in 2025 Eaton Fire
- Architectural style: Modernist
- Location: 596 East Punahou Street, Altadena, California, U.S.
- Year built: 1934
- Owner: Pauline Lowe

Design and construction
- Architect: Harwell Hamlton Harris

The Pauline Lowe Residence or Pauline Lowe House was a private home in Altadena, California, built in 1934, designed by Harwell Hamilton Harris. It was destroyed in the Eaton Fire in 2025.

== Design and construction ==
Pauline J. Lowe (1896–1983) worked for the Bullocks Wilshire department store in Los Angeles, and later was store manager at I. Magnin's Pasadena location. She asked her friend Harwell H. Harris to design a small one-story home for her. The modernist residence built in 1934 on East Punahou Street in Altadena, California, for about $4000. It was Harris's first independent project, after leaving the Richard Neutra office. The house was considered stylish; it was featured in California Arts and Architecture and other publications. The design won honorable mention in a House Beautiful competition, and its elements were copied elsewhere. Frank Lloyd Wright "acknowledged his admiration" for the Lowe residence.

The Lowe residence was built from redwood, and noted for its efficient use of a narrow lot, strategic shade placement, and earthquake safety features. Among its distinctive features were 21 exterior doors, some of them opening onto private exterior spaces for outdoor sleeping. The distinctive doors were initially sliding doors inspired by Japanese design; these were soon replaced with hinged doors, when Lowe complained about the original installations rattling in the wind. Harris's original design called for a flat roof, but the house had a hip roof when built.

== 2025 Eaton Fire ==
In 2025, the Pauline Lowe Residence was described by The New York Times as a "midcentury landmark," and by the Los Angeles Times as one of the "architecturally significant houses" destroyed in the Eaton Fire.
