= Pasadena Waldorf School =

Co-educational school in California, US

Coordinates: 34.19250°N 118.14487°W

Pasadena Waldorf School is a closed co-educational Waldorf school in Altadena established in 1979 and whose educational system is based on the methods of Rudolf Steiner. The building burned down during the 2025 Eaton Fire, the school however has plans to rebuild and resume operations in the future.

== Overview ==
The Pasadena Waldorf School was started as a K-8 school in 1979, and has since expanded to offer Preschool through 12th Grade.

The school is situated on two campuses spanning 9 acres (3.6 ha) in Altadena, California. The Paquita Lick Machris Campus offering grades K-8 is located at 209 E. Mariposa St, and the McComb Campus offering early childhood, preschool and high school is located at 536 E. Mendocino St, just 3 blocks away.

Their religious affiliation is nonsectarian.

== Academics and faculty ==
The student to teacher ratio is 9:1 (national average is 13:1) with 25% of faculty with advanced degrees.

== Support programmes ==
They provide organizational support for high school students with IEP or 504 plan.

== Student body ==
There are 300 students, and class sizes typically range from 18 to 25.

== Financial aid ==
They provide an average financial aid of $10000 and has 28% accepting the same.

== Sports ==
They offer four sports (Basketball, Flag Football, Track and Field, Volleyball) and 16 extracurriculars. In 2017 they formed a shared high school athletics team with Judson International School with the approval of California Interscholastic Federation Southern Section (CIF).

== See also ==
- Scripps Hall (California)
