= Janes Village =

Former neighborhood in Altadena, California

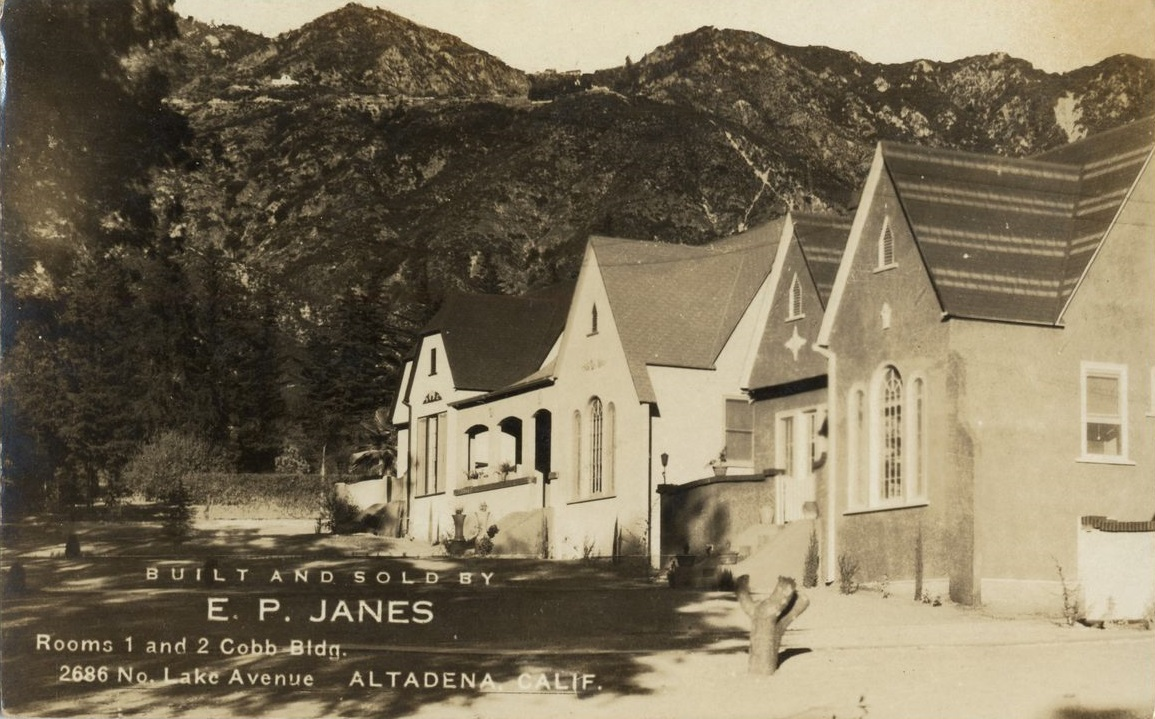
A photograph circa 1925 - 1926 shows Janes Village housing located on Lake Avenue with San Gabriel Mountains in the distance

Janes Village was a neighborhood in Altadena, California. It was characterized by the 160 cottages built by Elisha P. Janes between 1924 and 1926. It was destroyed in the 2025 Eaton Fires. In 2002, it was designated a historic Altadena Heritage Area.

== History ==
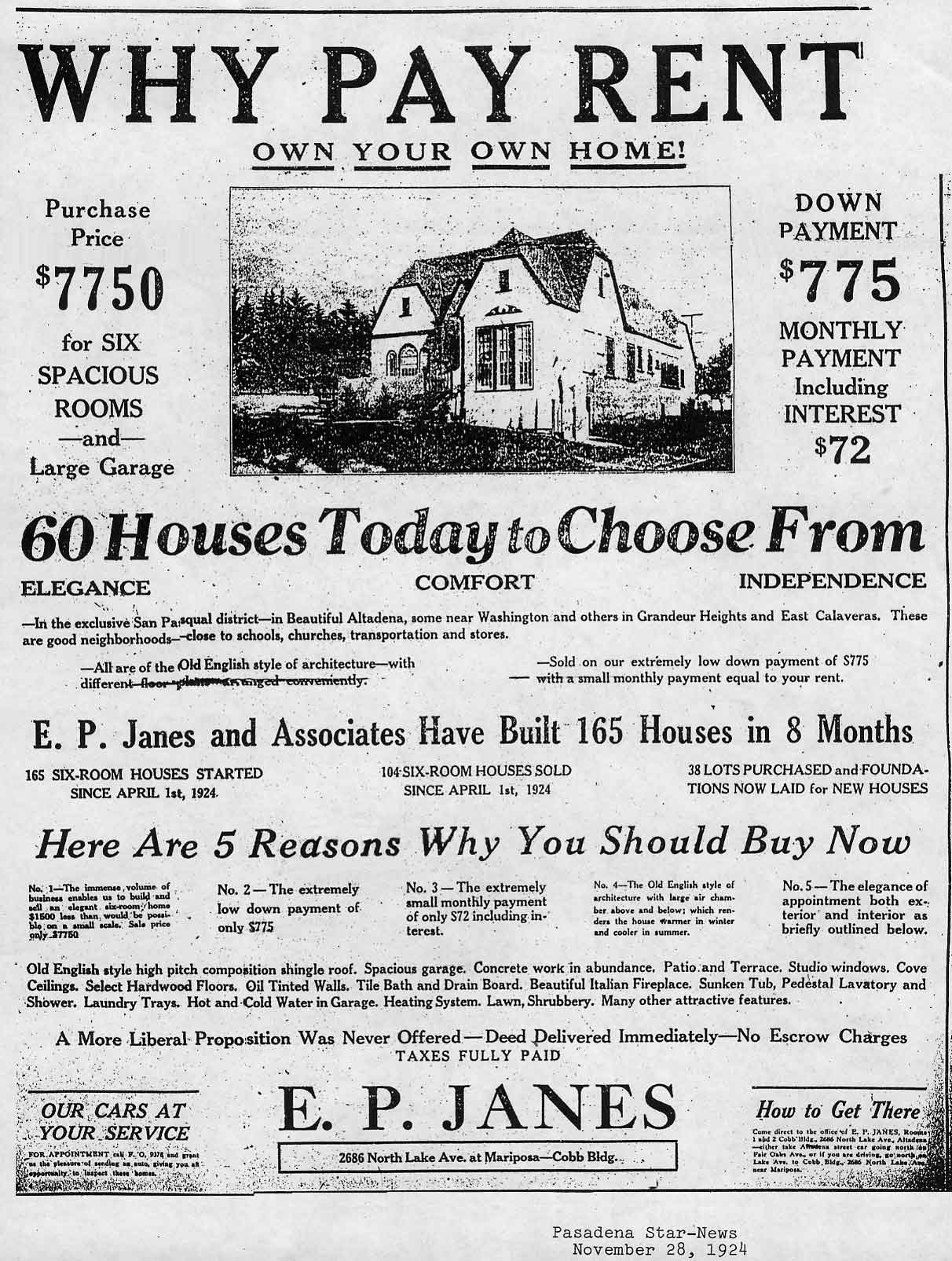
Jane's Village real estate advertisement that turned out to be a scam

In 1924, E.P. Janes began building "Homes of Distinction in Scenic Altadena," These houses featured European architectural design elements and steep gables.

=== Elisha Paul Janes ===
E.P. Janes was born in New York in 1877. He was the brother of American novelist Elizabeth Dejeans. Before the construction of Janes Village, he sold Lake Water from Soap Lake in Washington, claiming it would cure illness. After being convicted of land fraud, he left Washington and moved to Manhattan, where he conducted a mail-order scam involving flimsy tires. After his garage burnt down he moved to Altadena where he started constructing the homes that would become Janes Village.

=== 2025 Eaton Fires ===
In January 2025, many of the Janes Cottages were fully or partially destroyed by the Eaton Fires, while others remain intact. Later that year, the Altadena Collective was founded to offer rebuilding assistance for homes lost during the Eaton Fires, including Janes Cottages.
