= Altadena Town & Country Club =

Social club in Altadena, California

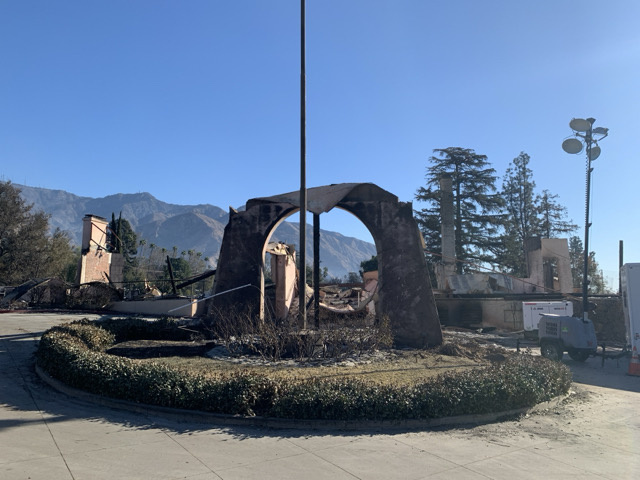
- The clubhouse shortly after the Eaton Fire in 2025
- Type: Nonprofit
- Industry: Country Club
- Founded: 1910
- Defunct: 2025
- Area served: Altadena, CA; Pasadena, CA; Sierra Madre, CA; Arcadia, CA; La Canada, CA; San Marino, CA
- Members: 1,700 (2023)
- Divisions: Splash Café; Players Lounge; Kids Klub
- Website: altaclub.com

Altadena Town & Country Club is a private social club in Altadena, California. Established in 1910, it offers a variety of recreational and social amenities. The club has historically been known for its clubhouse, scenic grounds, and a range of facilities including dining, tennis, and swimming. In January 2025, the club and its operations were heavily impacted by the Eaton Fire.

== History ==
The Altadena Town and Country Club was founded in 1910, making it one of the oldest social clubs in the San Gabriel Valley. The original clubhouse, a two-story building designed in the Craftsman style, was constructed shortly after the club's founding. Over the years, the clubhouse underwent several renovations and expansions to accommodate the growing membership and the need for modern facilities.

In January 2025, the historic clubhouse was destroyed by the Eaton Fire that greatly affected the Altadena area. The club partially reopened on August 31, 2025 following renovation of the tennis courts and pool. Replacement of the clubhouse is estimated to take around three years and over $20 million.

== In popular culture ==
=== Music videos ===
- Ed Sheeran and Justin Bieber - "I Don’t Care" (2019)
- Justin Bieber - "Yummy" (2020)

=== Television ===
- The Mentalist, Season 1, Episode 1 (2008)
- Starsky & Hutch (1975)
- The Wonder Years (1993)
- Mad Men, Season 2, Episode 11, The Jet Set (2007)
- Speechless (1994)
- Grey's Anatomy, Season 16, Episode 8 (2019)
- Lessons in Chemistry (2023)
- It's Always Sunny In Philadelphia, Season 12, Episode 2, "The Gang Goes to a Water Park" (2017)

=== Movies ===
- Dirty Dancing (1987)
- Van Wilder (2002)
- Freakier Friday (2025)
