= Altadena Not for Sale =

Nonprofit organization formed after Eaton Fire (2025)

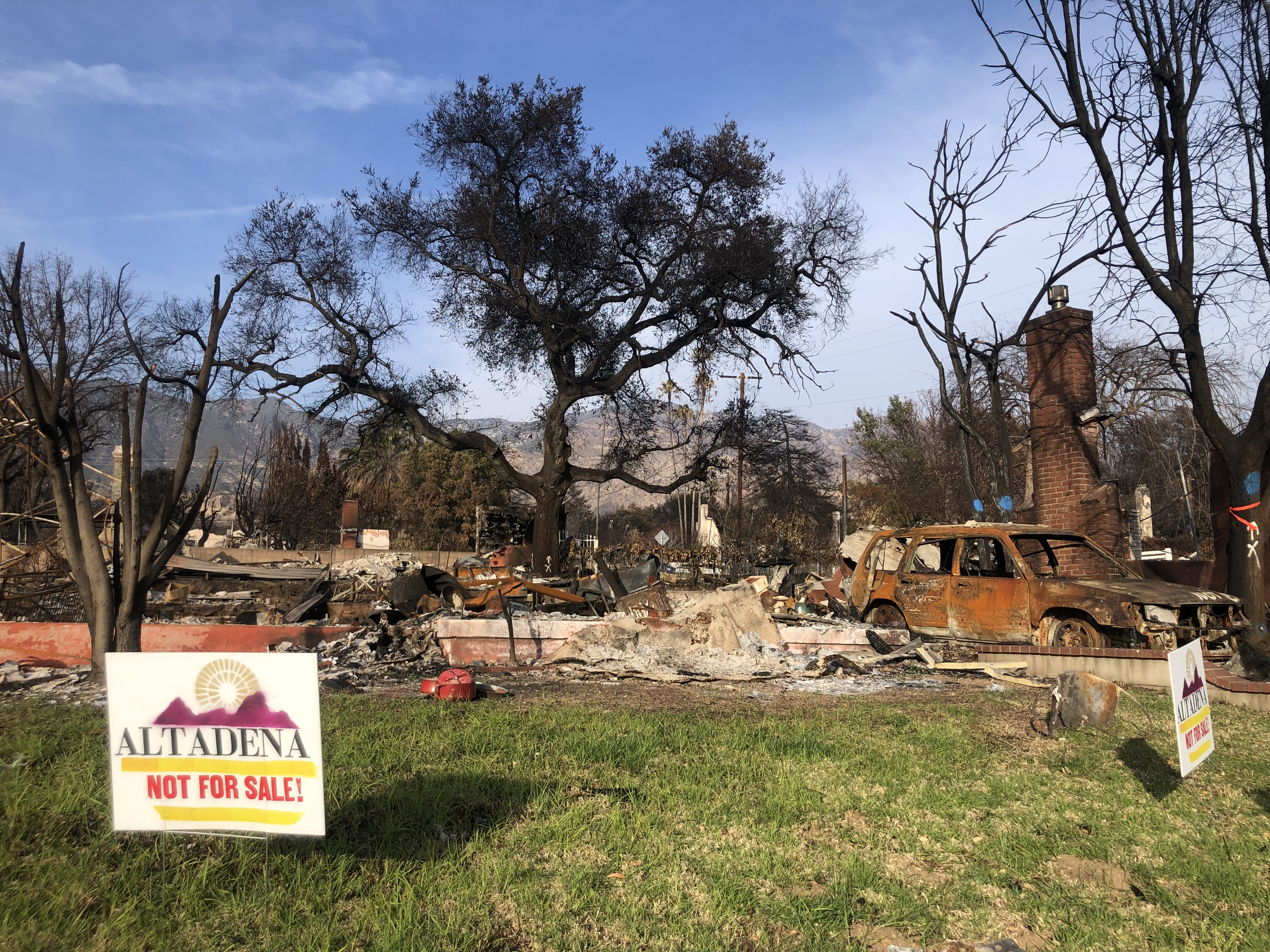
- Altadena Not for Sale yard signs in front of burnt out property and vehicle
- Formation: January 18, 2025; 22 months ago

Altadena Not for Sale is a community group of affected Eaton Fire victims and concerned residents of cities around Altadena that formed shortly after the Eaton Fire to draw attention to and advocate against land speculators and disaster capitalism in the area after the fire destroyed most of the community in Los Angeles County's San Gabriel Valley region.

A local community organizer and an Altadena screen printer that lost her home and home business in the fire co-founded the community group. Their demands to local legislators include a temporary moratorium on the purchasing of multiple properties in the same area by corporations or LLC's, and establishing land trusts to prevent Altadena from being sold off to for-profit or non-profit developers.

On January 18, 2025, the group held its first protest and car caravan in Altadena followed by another one on February 16, 2025. Local businesses and hundreds of residents started putting "Altadena Not for Sale" yard signs on their properties.

The group's work, struggles and advocacy intersects with others faced by primarily or predominantly Black communities.
