= Remote Sensing Center =

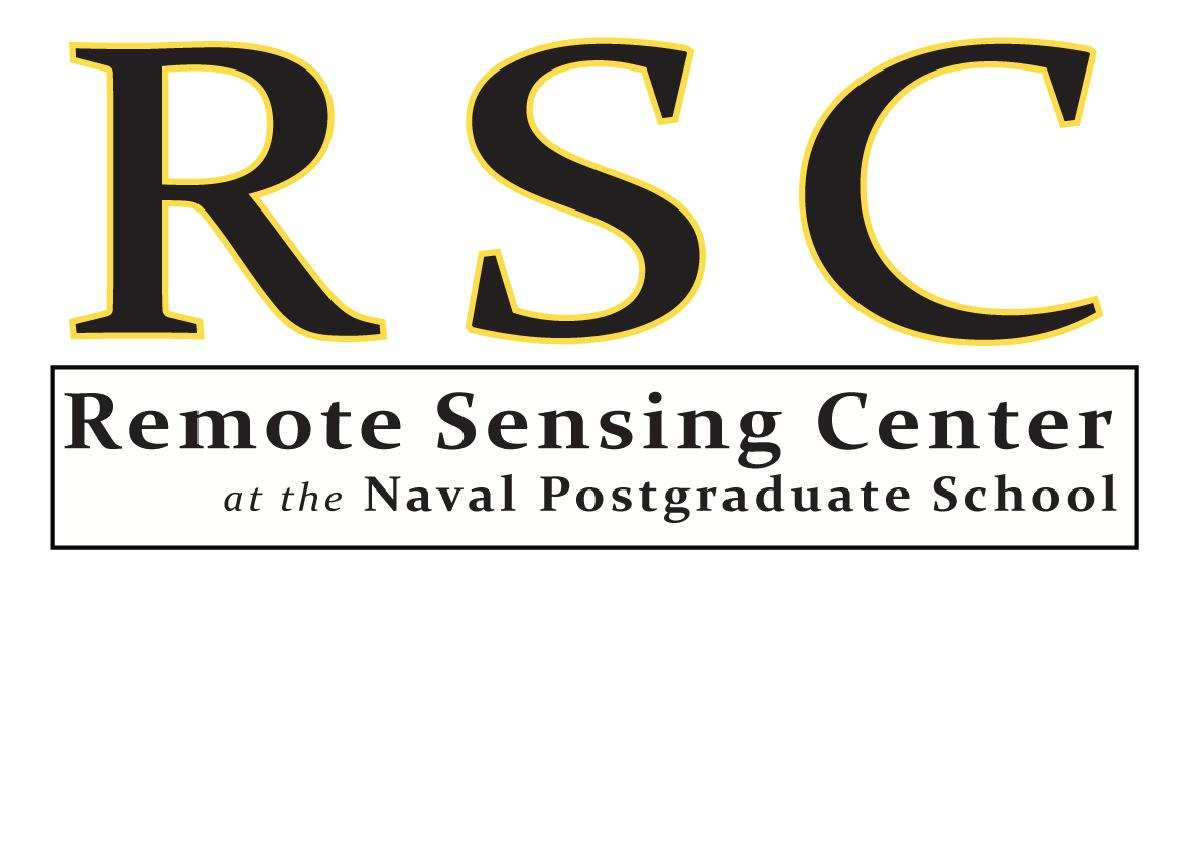
- Type: Graduate school
- Established: September 2006
- Location: Monterey, California, USA
- Website: www.nps.edu/rsc

The Remote Sensing Center (RSC) at the Naval Postgraduate School was established to bring together a range of capabilities and expertise to address problems of military and intelligence importance, as well as environmental and civil concerns. It is specialized in a variety of remote sensing technologies designed to enable people to look beyond the range of human vision in range or in spectral perception. Members of the RSC come from the physics, electrical and computer engineering, computer science, meteorology, and oceanography departments.

== Mission ==
Members of the RSC come from the physics, electrical and computer engineering, computer science, meteorology, and oceanography departments. They are collaborating to develop new remote sensing systems, as well as use and exploit current systems in air and space. It is part of a larger activity in the Monterey Bay area that provides expertise in topical areas outside the technical disciplines available at NPS.

The Naval Postgraduate School, and specifically the Remote Sensing Center, has the ability to handle classified data, as well as access to a Sensitive Compartmented Information Facility (SCIF) that is fully equipped with comms, storage, and processing capabilities. The RSC has pre-established cooperative research with government, academia, and industry in the remote sensing sector ranging from local to international partners. Highly experienced military officers, intelligence analysts, and faculty are a critical part of the NPS research staff.

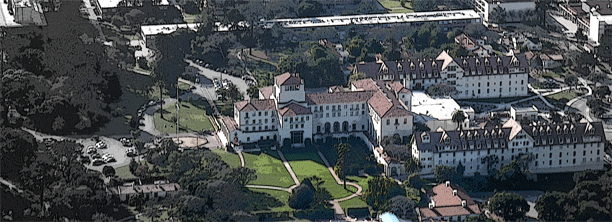

== Projects ==
=== Lidar ===
Lidar (LIght raDAR) works as an optical analog to radar in the visible spectrum of light with advantages related to the smaller wavelengths of the laser pulse. Lidar ranges in wavelength from ultra-violet (0.3-0.45 μm) to visible (0.45-0.70 μm) to the infrared (1-15 μm). Lidar can detect much smaller particles than radar in the atmosphere (which cannot detect things smaller than cloud particles), and thus can be used for aerosol detection.

The raw form of data is a set of x,y,z coordinate points. With recent advances, resolution has improved dramatically. Raw data can be processed to remove unwanted areas or features. Outputs such as topographic maps with contour lines can also be derived from lidar. Programs to manipulate lidar data include ENVI, ERDAS IMAGINE, ArcInfo, and ESRI ArcView (with 3D analyst ext.) One useful derivation of lidar data is the DEM (Digital Elevation Model). DEMs are displayed in a raster format with a matrix. The DEM has a specified cell size that corresponds to the earth’s surfaces. The cell contains the average elevation of the points within it.

The Remote Sensing Center is planning research projects that undertake the modeling and testing of analytical processing and using more fieldwork to obtain ground-truth measurements. Projects have been completed and are currently underway in terrain classification including Elkhorn Slough and hidden trail identification. Other future projects include a collaboration with the MOdeling, Virtual Environments, and Simulation (MOVES) institute on lidar standards for data structure and visualization tools and modeling new lidar analysis tools.

=== Spectral Imagery Analysis ===
Spectral imagery measures the spectral character of materials within the visible range and beyond. Two objects may appear visually identical but may be distinguished through examination of their spectral properties. Computer software can use a color scheme to make them visible.

A subset of spectral imagery, hyperspectral imaging data, is produced when "solar electromagnetic energy reflected from the earth's surface is dispersed into many contiguous narrow spectral bands by an airborne spectrometer" (Stefanou, 1997, p. 2). Our current research and projects include environmental mapping, target detection, and change detection.

The Remote Sensing Center works with airborne and satellite systems including IKONOS/Quickbird multispectral imagery (MSI), and airborne hyperspectral imaging (HSI) systems including AVIRIS, HYDICE, CASI, and HYMAP. Classification and analysis, including atmospheric compensation is performed using standard industry research tools; notably ENVI and ERDAS Imagine. The RSC has acquired a polarimetric camera for expanding experimentation in the visible spectrum.

== Intelligence ==
The Remote Sensing Center benefits from the secure facilities at NPS. Having the ability to process classified data with an on-site, fully equipped Sensitive Compartmented Information Facility (SCIF) allows students and faculty to pursue lines of research and work with technologies unavailable to the public.

The sustained efforts of fully funded graduate students, both military and civilian with an average of eight to ten years of field experience, have conducted research in an array of topics related to remote sensing.

- Current projects include:

Helicopter Brownout (terrain classification) using National Technical Means (NTM)
Maritime Domain Awareness (ASW)
Snow/Ice study with UCSB using NTM

== Degree Programs ==
The Remote Sensing Research and Education Program (RS-REP) is an interdisciplinary program to promote Remote Sensing technical education and research advancement to ensure that the Intelligence Community is fully supported for technology evolution. The curriculum is in hiatus as of 2017.

== Partners ==
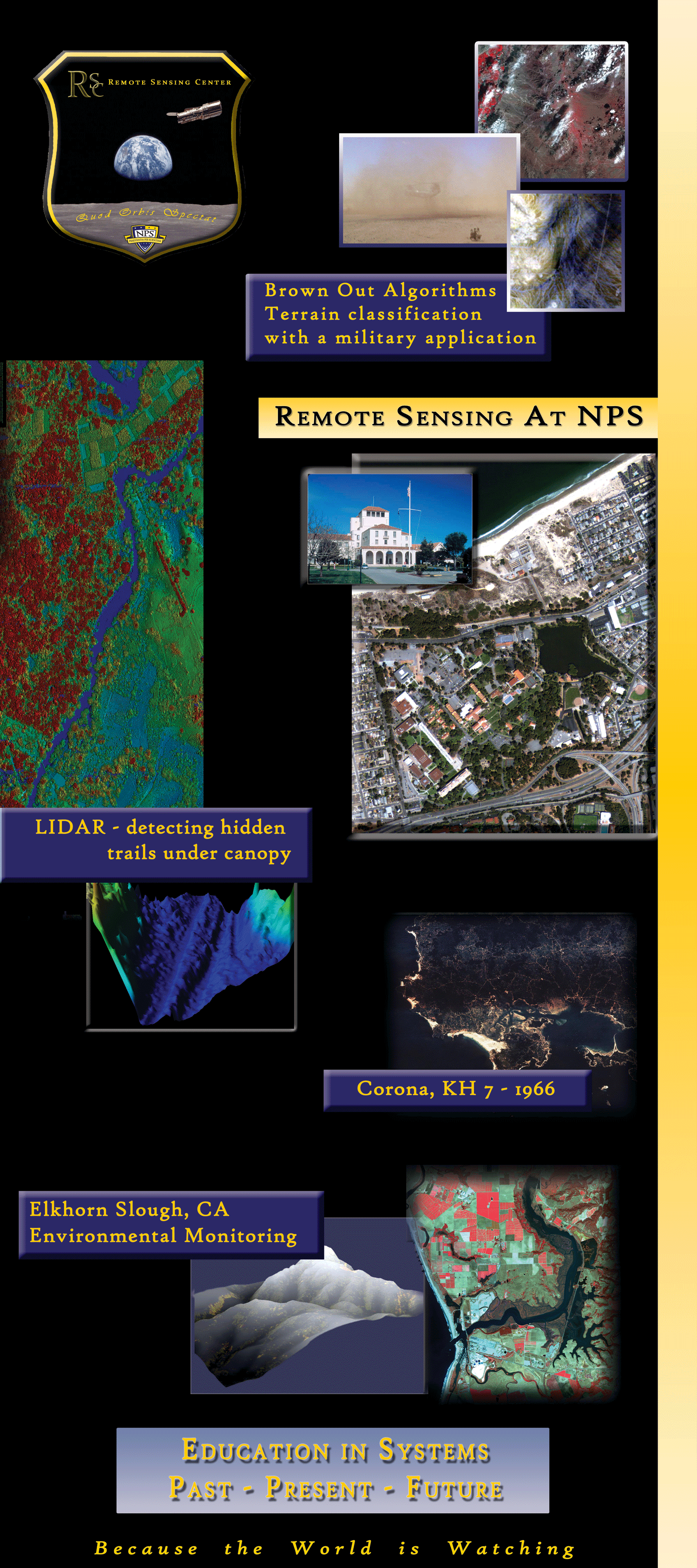

- University Partners

University of California, Santa Barbara
University of California, Santa Cruz
California State University, Monterey Bay

- Community Science Partners

Elkhorn Slough Foundation
Moss Landing Marine Laboratory
Stanford’s Hopkins Marine Institute
Monterey Bay Aquarium Research Institute
Fleet Numerical Meteorology and Oceanography Center
National Laboratories
Lawrence Livermore National Laboratory
Argonne National Laboratory

- Government Agencies

National Oceanic and Atmospheric Administration
United States Geological Survey
United States Naval Research Laboratory
DIA Advanced RADAR Center
National Geospatial-Intelligence Agency (NGA)
National Reconnaissance Office (NRO)

== Members ==
Faculty and staff

- Richard Christopher Olsen: Executive Director, Professor in the Physics Department
- David Trask: NPS MASINT Chair (Colonel, USAF ret.)

Research associates

- Jeremy Metcalf

Affiliated Faculty

- Dr. Mathias Kolsch
