= Airborne visible/infrared imaging spectrometer =

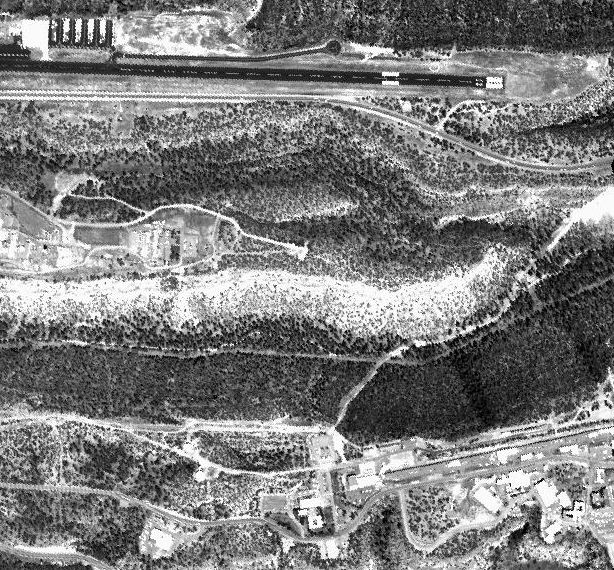
AVIRIS scene in the dLos Alamos area, taken in 2004

The airborne visible/infrared imaging spectrometer (AVIRIS) is the second in a series of imaging spectrometer instruments developed at the Jet Propulsion Laboratory (JPL) for Earth remote sensing. This instrument uses scanning optics and four spectrometers to image a 614-pixel swath simultaneously in 224 adjacent spectral bands.

== Objective ==
The main objective of the AVIRIS project is to identify, measure, and monitor constituents of the Earth's surface/ atmosphere based on molecular absorption and particle scattering signatures. Research with AVIRIS data is predominantly focused on understanding processes related to the global environment and climate change. AVIRIS research areas include ecology, oceanography, geology, snow hydrology, cloud and atmospheric studies.

== Platforms ==
AVIRIS has been flown on four aircraft platforms: the NASA ER-2 jet, Twin Otter International's turboprop, Scaled Composites Proteus, and NASA's WB-57. The ER-2 flies at approximately 20 km above sea level, at about 730 km/h. The Twin Otter aircraft flies at 4 km above ground level at 130 km/h. AVIRIS has flown North America, Europe, portions of South America, and Argentina.

== Initial design and characteristics ==
The Jet Propulsion Laboratory proposed to design and develop the AVIRIS in 1983. AVIRIS first measured spectral images in 1987 and measured the solar reflected spectrum from 400 nanometers to 2500 nanometers. AVIRIS measures upwelling radiance through 224 contiguous spectral channels at 10 nanometer intervals across the spectrum.

== Successors ==
A number of newer AVIRIS models have been developed, with improvements to signal-to-noise ratio, spatial and spectral resolution. The latest, AVIRIS-5, made its first flight in 2025.

== See also ==
- Multispectral pattern recognition
- Remote Sensing Center
- Jet Propulsion Laboratory
