= Zorthian Ranch =

Artist colony and museum in Altadena, United States

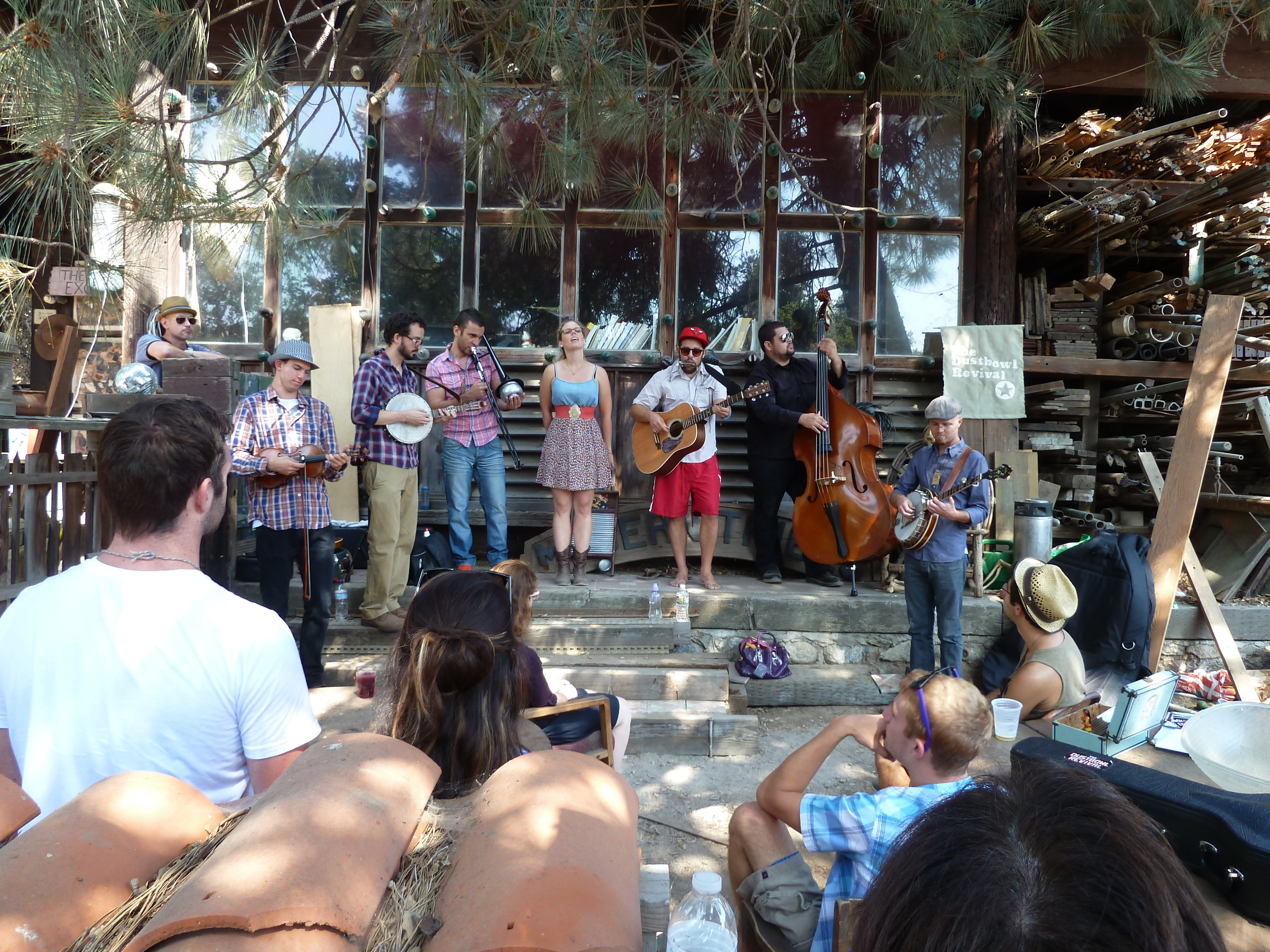
- 2012 Folk Festival at Zorthian Ranch
- Interactive map of the Zorthian Ranch area

General information
- Status: Partially destroyed
- Type: Ranch
- Location: California, 3990 N Fair Oaks Ave, Altadena, California, United States
- Coordinates: 34.039106°N 118.584093°W
- Destroyed: 8 January 2025

Zorthian Ranch is a 48-acre artist colony (19 ha) in Altadena, California established in 1946 by Armenian-American artist Jirayr Zorthian. Described as a "masterpiece of outsider architecture", much of the property was destroyed in the Eaton Fire in January 2025.

== Background ==
The Zorthian family escaped the Armenian genocide and in 1923 fled to the United States. Zorthian and his first wife, Betty, moved to Altadena to experiment with urban homesteading in 1946. Driven by his father's assessment of the US as "a wild, beautiful, abundant, rich and wasteful country", Zorthian vowed to recycle everything he could and create a self-sufficient environment on the ranch. Sculptures and built environments on the property utilized repurposed architectural fragments, construction debris, doll parts, lawn furniture, telephone poles, railroad ties, and old cars and trucks. Zorthian salvaged only materials created by hand. The first structures built, the Chardhouse and the Studio, used redwood from homes that had been demolished. The Palace, built in the 1970s, was made with railroad ties, discarded telephone poles, and insulators. The Zorthian Barn Gallery housed mural studies created by Zorthian commissioned under President Franklin Roosevelt's Works Progress Administration during the Great Depression. Associated with the assemblage movement, he viewed the entire ranch as his canvas. Waste became art, and the property became an open art gallery. Zorthian referred to the ranch as "The Center for Research and Development of Industrial Discards with Emphasis on Aesthetics." During the summers of 1958 through 1982, Zorthian and his second wife, Dabney, ran Zorthian Ranch for Children, an anarchic daily art camp for kids. Zorthian traded art classes for lessons in physics from his neighbor, Richard Feynman, a Nobel Prize laureate who spent considerable time at the ranch.

Zorthian was known as the "last bohemian," and the ranch became well known as a hub for bohemian bacchanals. In 1952 Charlie Parker led a legendary naked all-night jam session, excerpts from which were released on CD in 2006. Andy Warhol, Bob Dylan, and Andrés Segovia, among other artists and intellectuals, also attended the parties. When Zorthian died in 2004 at 92, the ranch was entrusted to his children, Alice and Alan. Alan and his daughter, Julia Zorthian, kept the ranch afloat financially by farming, Airbnb rentals, and hosting drawing and yoga classes. Ten residential buildings made of reusable, reinvented waste, were leased to artists. The property was also used for events, photography, and as a film location.

In a 2014 PBS segment, Alan Zorthian said: "The wind gets very strong here...Drainage can be an issue with rain, and then we have periods of drought and station fires." On January 8, 2025, all but two of the buildings on the property were destroyed in the Eaton wildfire. A GoFundMe campaign to rebuild Zorthian Ranch was launched on January 10.
