= Scripps Hall (California) =

Historic house in California, United States

- U.S. National Register of Historic Places
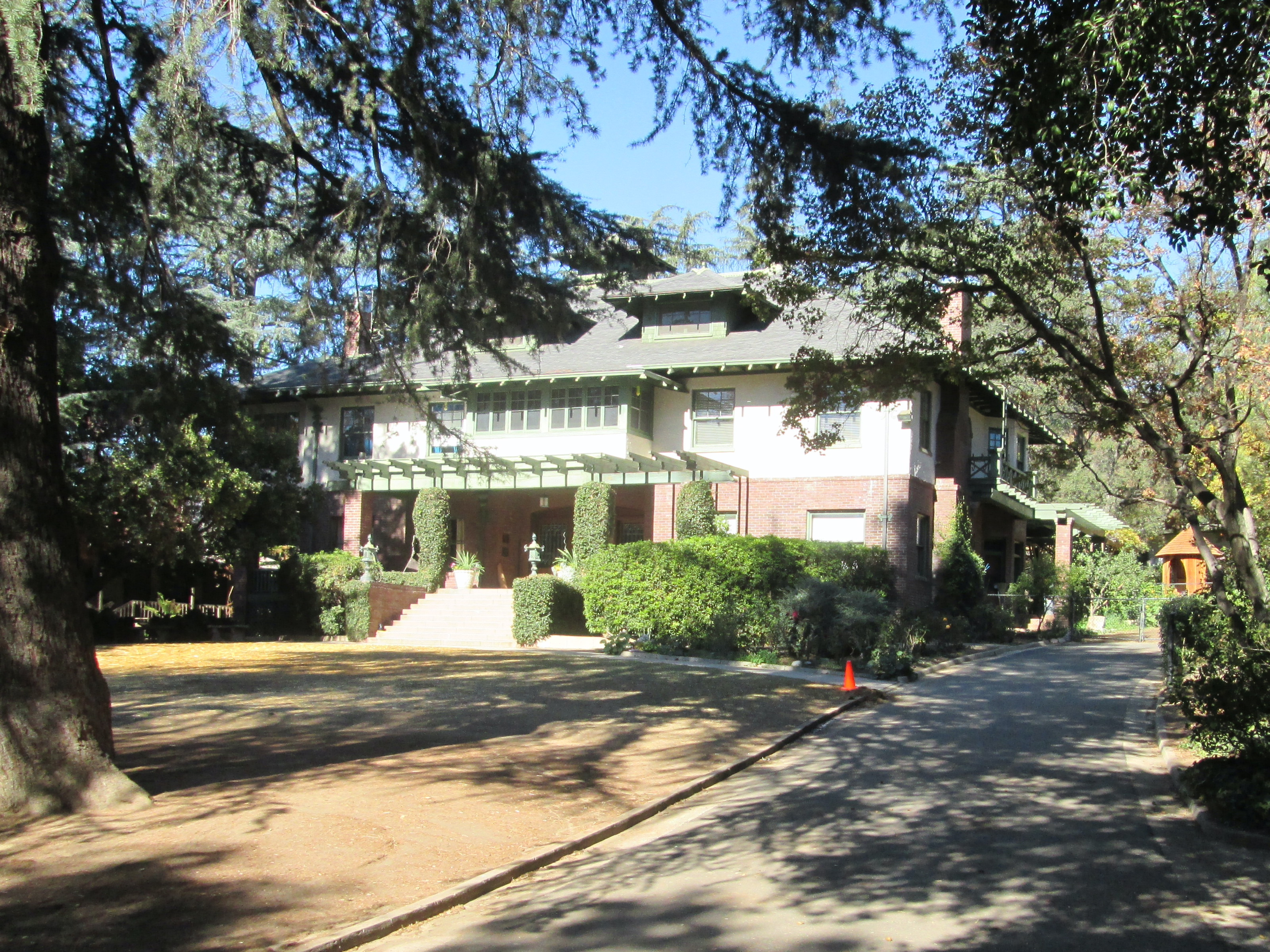
- Scripps Hall in 2014

- Location within the Los Angeles metropolitan area Location within California Location within the United States
- Location: 209 E. Mariposa St., Altadena, California
- Coordinates: 34°11′34″N 118°8′38″W
- Area: 5.3 acres (2.1 ha)
- Architect: Buchanan, Charles W.; Stanley, C.N.
- Architectural style: Bungalow/Craftsman
- NRHP reference No.: 99000893
- Added to NRHP: July 28, 1999

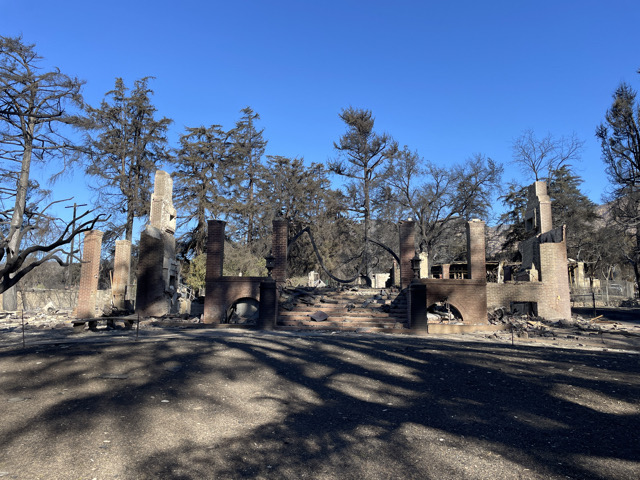
Ruins of the building shortly after the Eaton Fire in 2025

Scripps Hall, which had held part of the Pasadena Waldorf School, was a large American Craftsman or Arts and Crafts-style house located in the foothills of the San Gabriel Mountains in Altadena, California, United States. It was built in 1904 as the central feature of the Scripps Estate and is listed on the National Register of Historic Places. It was lost in the 2025 Eaton Fire, with the upper school at 209 East Mariposa Avenue completely destroyed.

== History and significance ==
Scripps Hall was built by William Armiger Scripps. The house is a three-story Arts and Crafts style residence designed by architect Charles W. Buchanan. Scripps lived in a small bungalow on his property near the intersection of Mariposa Street and Fair Oaks Avenue in 1904 while his three-story mansion was built. He planted citrus and olive groves on his 'Scripps Estate' located in the community then known as North Pasadena.

After William died, Scripps Hall was subsequently passed to his grandson. The western portion of the property was subdivided. In 1979, with the residence threatened with demolition, the Altadena Heritage Association coordinated the historic home's sale to the Pasadena Waldorf School, one of many Waldorf Schools around the world. Scripps Hall was placed on the National Register of Historic Places in 1999 under Criterion A for its representation of local history and development patterns (#99000893). The nomination notes that the property is significant for its "design by a well-known local architect, C. W. Buchanan (only one of two of his major works still standing in Altadena); its high state of integrity; its association with a regionally significant long-term original owner, the Scripps family; and its prominence within the historic context of Altadena's residential growth and development during the first decades of the 20th century. It is the most intact example of the estates that once lined Altadena's "Millionaire's Row."

== William A. Scripps ==
William Armiger Scripps was the son of James Mogg Scripps. His father was a prominent bookbinder in England and came to America in 1844 with six motherless children. Scripps grew up on a Rushville, Illinois farm, where his father remarried. William moved to Detroit, Michigan, where he and his brother George opened a print shop. His other siblings and half-siblings, such as E. W. Scripps and James E. Scripps, owned and operated major newspapers around the country. After the original print shop was destroyed by fire, William Scripps moved to Southern California, being financially supported by the family newspaper empire, the E. W. Scripps Company. Scripps spent some time with his siblings in La Jolla, California, before moving to Altadena in 1904.

William Scripps' sister was Ellen Browning Scripps, also involved with the founding of the E. W. Scripps Company, who became a prominent philanthropist in founding the Scripps Research Institute, Scripps Institution of Oceanography, Scripps College, and the Rancho Santa Ana Botanic Garden. William also became involved in community philanthropy and founded 'Scripps Home' in Altadena for the elderly.

== See also ==
- Arts and Crafts movement
- Category: American Craftsman architecture in California
