= Pasadena Now =

- Type: Online magazine
- Founder(s): James Macpherson; Candice Merrill
- Founded: 2004; 22 years ago
- Language: English
- Headquarters: Pasadena, California
- Website: pasadenanow.com/main/

Pasadena Now is an online magazine covering local news in Pasadena, California. It was founded in 2004 by James Macpherson and Candice Merrill. Most of the magazine’s content is outsourced to overseas writers.

== History ==
In April 2004 James Macpherson founded the news site Pasadena Now. Three years later, Macpherson hired two writers from India off of Craigslist to report for his website. One person living in Mumbai was offered $12,000 annually and another living Bangalore was offered $7,200 annually to watch live stream broadcasts of city council meetings and write up articles. Macpherson announced plans to hire more overseas reporters who would also re-write emailed press releases. Some local journalists and journalism professors were dismayed by the plan.

Macpherson referred to the practice of outsourcing local reporting to international workers as "glocal" part of a broader “newspaperless” strategy that is more cost-effective. By 2008, he and his wife Candice Merrill had fired his seven Pasadena staffers, including five reporters, and replaced them with Indians. One editor at The Pasadena Star-News called the practice “nutty.” A columnist at the Los Angeles Times saw the reporting as lacking nuance or depth, but harmless.

In 2012, Macpherson founded a business called Journtent, which pays writers, mostly living in the Philippines and Mexico, to watch and transcribe livestreams of community meetings for newspapers.
