= List of destroyed heritage of the United States =

This is a list of destroyed heritage of the United States. The year of demolition is marked in parentheses.

This is a list of cultural-heritage sites that have been damaged or destroyed accidentally, deliberately, or by a natural disaster, sorted by state. Only those buildings and structures which fulfill Wikipedia's standards of notability should be included. The simplest test of this is whether the building or structure has its own article page.

Cultural heritage can be subdivided into two main types—tangible and intangible heritage. The former includes built heritage such as religious buildings, museums, monuments, and archaeological sites, as well as movable heritage such as works of art and manuscripts. Intangible cultural heritage includes customs, music, fashion and other traditions within a particular culture. This article mainly deals with the destruction of built heritage; the destruction of movable collectable heritage is dealt with in art destruction, whilst the destruction of movable industrial heritage remains almost totally ignored.

== Alabama ==
- David Rinehart Anthony House
- Augusta Sledge House (circa 2010)
- Birmingham Terminal Station (1969)
- Cedar Haven (2000s)
- Daniel Payne College

== Arizona ==
- Grand Canyon Lodge (2025): destroyed by Dragon Bravo Fire
- Las Playas Intaglio in the Cabeza Prieta National Wildlife Refuge (2026): bulldozed during the construction of the Mexico–United States border wall

== California ==
- International Savings & Exchange Bank Building (1954): Demolished by the city government of Los Angeles.
- Marine Corps Air Station Tustin Hanger No 1 (2023): fire
- MGM Silent and Early Sound Film Archive (1965): A fire in one of the studio's archival vaults destroyed the only copies of hundreds of silent and early sound era MGM films.
- Richfield Tower (1969): Demolished to clear site for City National Plaza.
- Samuel and Luella Maslon House (2002) Demolished for unknown reasons.
- Andrew McNally House (2025): historic house destroyed during the 2025 California wildfires.
- Bunny Museum (2025): novelty museum destroyed during the 2025 California wildfires.
- Zane Grey Estate (2025): house of Canadian author Zane Grey destroyed during the 2025 California wildfires.
- Gen. Charles S. Farnsworth County Park (2025) historical park destroyed during the 2025 California wildfires.

== Georgia ==
- Bonaventure Plantation (1804): fire
- Georgia Guidestones (2022): bombing
- Greenwich Plantation (1923): fire
- Wetter House (1950): demolished

== Illinois ==
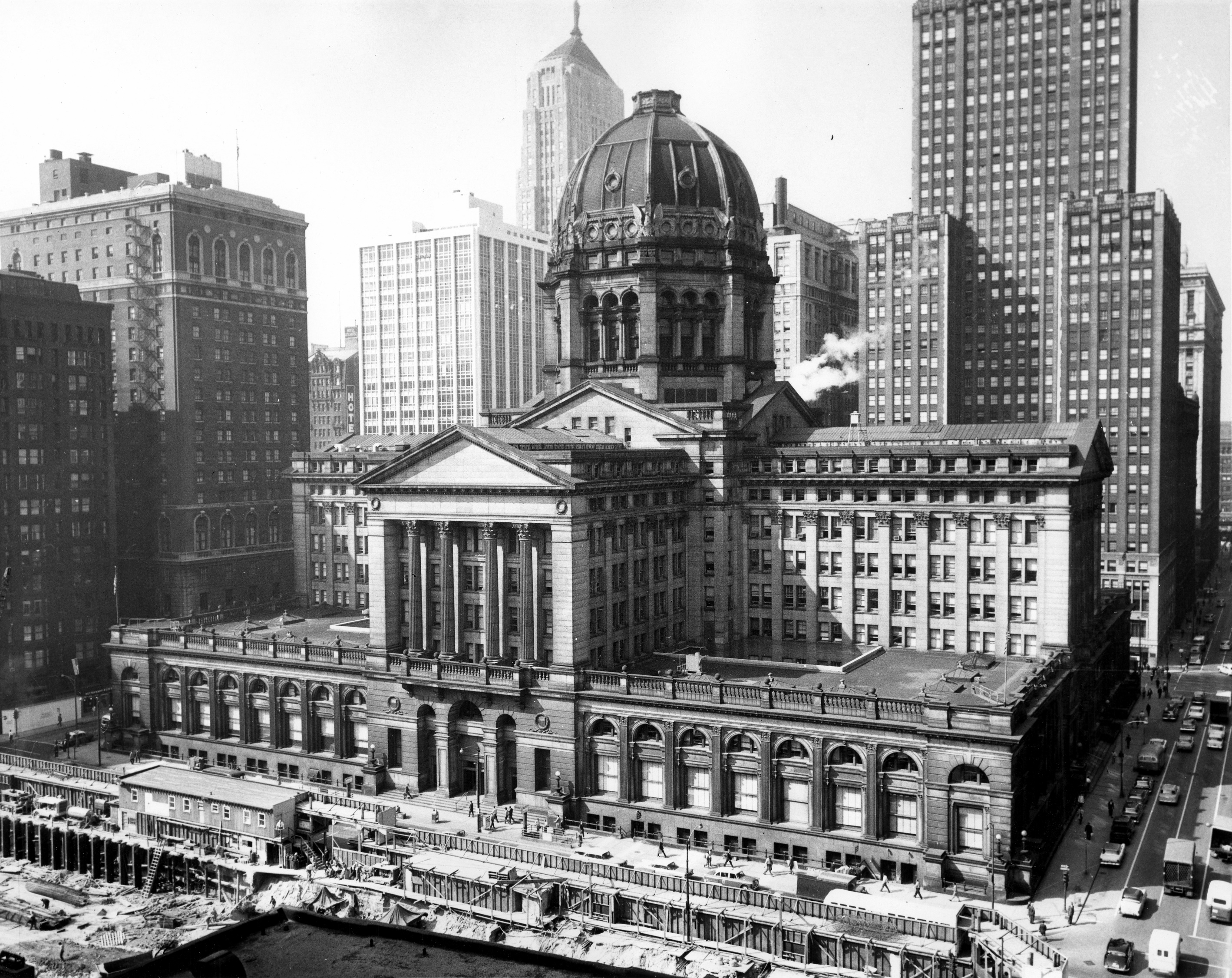
Chicago Federal Building

- Chicago Federal Building (1965)
- Garrick Theater (1961)
- Home Insurance Building (1931): Demolished to clear site for the Field Building.
- Masonic Temple (1939)

== Indiana ==
- Bridgeton Covered Bridge (2005): arson
- Bucklen Theatre (1986)
- Cadle Tabernacle (1968)
- Indianapolis Traction Terminal (1972)
- Louisville and Nashville Railroad Station (Evansville, Indiana) (1985)
- Snyderman House (2002): arson
- Terre Haute Union Station (1960)
- Tomlinson Hall (1958): fire
- Wilbur Wynant House (2006): fire

== Kentucky ==
- Mayfield Downtown Commercial District and Mayfield United States Post Office (2021): mostly destroyed by a tornado

== Louisiana ==
- New Orleans Cotton Exchange (1964)

== Massachusetts ==
- Kragsyde (1929)

== Michigan ==
- Detroit City Hall (1961)
- Franklin H. Walker House (1998)
- J. L. Hudson Department Store and Addition (1998)
- William Livingstone House (2007)

== Minnesota ==
- Metropolitan Building (1961)

== Mississippi ==
- Brierfield Plantation (1931): fire

== Missouri ==
- Kiel Auditorium (1992)

== New Jersey ==
- 20th Century Fox Silent Film Archive (1937): A fire in the studio's archival vault destroyed the only prints and original negatives of a majority of silent era films produced by the Fox Film Corporation prior to 1932, as well as the majority of the silent film negatives of Educational Pictures.
- Marlborough-Blenheim Hotel (1978): Demolished to clear site for construction of Bally's Atlantic City.
- Traymore Hotel (1972): Demolished during a downturn in economic fortunes in Atlantic City.
- Ulysses S. Grant Cottage (1963): Demolished by owners.

== New York ==
- Great Northern Elevator, Buffalo (2022)
- Larkin Administration Building, Buffalo (1950)
- Pennsylvania Station (1963)
- World Trade Center (2001)

== Ohio ==
- Heinrich A. Rattermann House (2005)
- Nasby Building
- Many mounds of the Ohio Hopewell lost throughout the nineteenth and twentieth centuries to cultivation and urban expansion. Notable examples include:
  - Marietta Earthworks - almost entirely covered by the city of Marietta.
  - Newark Earthworks - numerous probable ceremonial walkways and several large enclosures lost to urban expansion of Newark.
  - Mound City Group - Mostly destroyed during the construction of Camp Sherman. Evidence of the mounds is still present below the surface and is currently preserved by the National Park Service.

== Oregon ==
- Angell–Brewster House (2010); demolished
- Broadway Theatre (Portland, Oregon) (1988): demolished
- Centennial Mills (2026): damaged by fire then demolished
- Fox Theatre (Portland, Oregon) (1997): demolished
- The Oregonian Building (1950): demolished
- Oriental Theatre (Portland, Oregon) (1970): demolished
- Pilot Butte Inn (1973): demolished
- Portland Gas & Coke Building (2015): demolished
- Samuel Elmore Cannery (1993)
- First Sellwood Bridge (2016): demolished
- Van Buren Street Bridge (2024): demolished

== Pennsylvania ==
- Broad Street Station (1953)
- Carnegie Building (1952)
- La Ronda (2009)
- Linden Grove (2000)
- Pennsylvania Hall (Philadelphia) (1838)
- President's House (Philadelphia) (1936 - 1951)
- Wabash Pittsburgh Terminal (1954)
- Whitemarsh Hall (1980)

== Rhode Island ==
- Whitehall (1971)
- America Street School (1996)

== Tennessee ==
- Luther Brannon House (2021)
- Readyville Mill (2023): Destroyed by a tornado

== Virginia ==
- Abingdon (1930)
- Chantilly mansion (1863)
- Leesylvania (1950)

== Washington ==
- Manning-Rye Covered Bridge (2020): wildfire

== Washington, D.C. ==
- Raleigh Hotel (1964)
- Wylie Mansion (1947): destroyed partially by fire and then demolished
- East Wing of the White House (2025): partially demolished for construction of a new ballroom.

== See also ==
- Save America's Treasures
- List of destroyed heritage
- List of monuments and memorials removed during the George Floyd protests
- Removal of Confederate monuments and memorials
