= Bulgarini Vino Cucina =

Italian restaurant in Altadena, California, U.S.

- Interactive map of Bulgarini Vino Cucina

Restaurant information
- Established: 2006
- Owners: Leo Bulgarini, Elizabeth Foldi
- Food type: Italian
- Dress code: Casual
- Location: 749 East Altadena Drive, Altadena, California, 91001, United States
- Coordinates: 34°11′26.9″N 118°7′55.7″W
- Website: bulgarinigelato.com

Bulgarini Vino Cucina, previously (and still commonly) known as Bulgarini Gelato Artigianale, is a restaurant specializing in Italian cuisine. Originally established as an ice cream parlor specializing in gelato, it is located at 749 East Altadena Drive in Altadena, California, beside The Bunny Museum.

== History ==
Bulgarini was founded in 2006 by Leo Bulgarini, a Rome-born former sommelier, and his wife Elizabeth Foldi, with Bulgarini originally operating out of an ice cream cart stationed at the courtyard of the USC Pacific Asia Museum in neighboring Pasadena before opening a standalone location in Altadena. The couple later opened a second location in Culver City, which closed in 2014.

Originally serving several flavors of gelato, including a pistachio flavor made with the rare Pistacchio di Bronte cultivar sourced from Sicily, in 2018 Bulgarini started serving a small selection of handmade pasta dishes as part of a special dining menu, paired with a screening of Italian comedy films screened from the courtyard. This would lead to the pasta dishes becoming a permanent part of the menu and the ice cream parlor transitioning into a full-fledged restaurant.

The restaurant, along with the neighboring Nancy's Greek Café and an adjacent bakery, survived the 2025 Eaton Fire although much of the surrounding neighborhood, including the neighboring Bunny Museum and the owners' home a few blocks away, was destroyed. Despite surviving the fire it remains closed, with Bulgarini remarking that it is not safe for serving or eating food, and with a high probability of it needing to relocate out of Altadena to either Eagle Rock or La Crescenta-Montrose.
