= Ethelynde Smith =

American singer

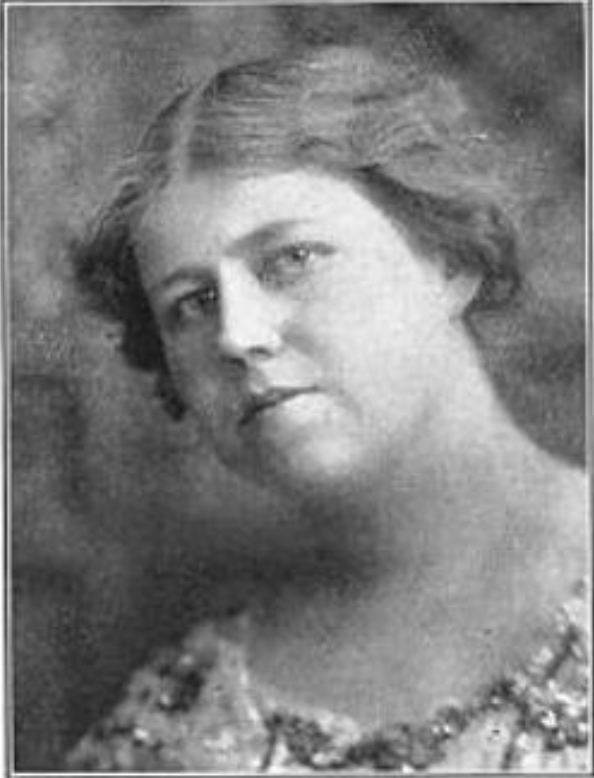
Ethelynde Smith, from a 1914 publication.

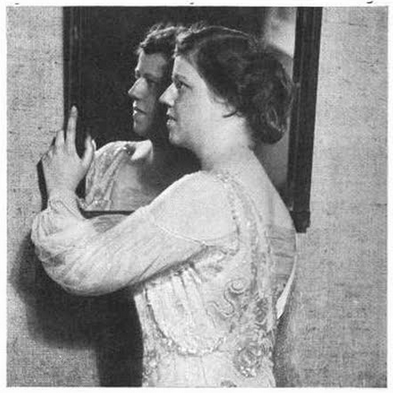
Ethelynde Smith, from a 1920 publication.

Ethelynde Smith (May 28, 1888 — February 1978) was an American concert singer and botanical painter.

== Early life ==
Ethelynde Smith was born in Portland, Maine, the daughter of Mr. and Mrs. George E. Smith. She trained as a singer in Boston and New York. After some local success, she was invited to be a soloist at the Maine Music Festival in 1916, singing alongside Geraldine Farrar.

== Career ==
Smith toured as a concert singer from the mid-1910s through the 1930s, performing as a guest soloist with orchestras in larger theatres and giving more intimate recitals to women's clubs and college audiences across the United States and Canada. She managed her own publicity, bookings, and other arrangements, and drove herself between engagements. During and after World War I, she presented a program of "old songs of the allied nations". She had restored German songs to her programs by 1928.

Smith moved to Altadena in southern California and turned to the visual arts after an illness in 1943 affected her voice. She specialized in botanical watercolors. She participated in exhibitions at the Chicago Natural History Museum in 1949 and 1957, at the Museum of Arts and Sciences in Rochester, New York in 1957, at the Los Angeles County Museum of Art in 1965, and at Descanso Gardens in California in 1966. "The magnificent flower paintings by Ethelynde Smith at the Chicago Natural History Museum remind one of Georgia O'Keeffe's enormous, perfect blossoms", raved Eleanor Jewett of the Chicago Tribune, adding that the exhibit was "informative as well as pleasing to the eye". Another critic, however, considered them more horticultural illustration than art.

Smith was awarded an honorary degree from Aurora College in 1945, for helping to build the college's music library collection.

== Legacy ==
Ethelynde Smith died in 1978, aged 89 years. Her papers are archived at Aurora University.
