= Altadena, California =

Unincorporated community in California, United States

- Unincorporated community Census designated place
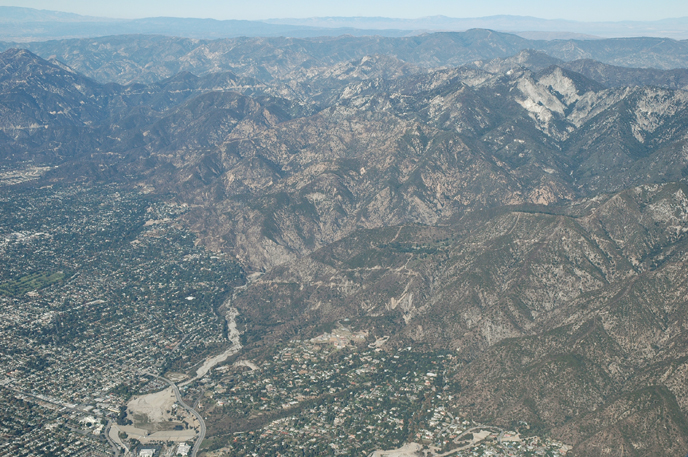
- Aerial view of Altadena and Eaton Canyon

- Flag
- Interactive map of Altadena, California
- Location in the United States
- Coordinates: 34°11′19″N 118°8′5″W
- Country: United States
- State: California
- County: Los Angeles

Area
  - Total: 8.48 sq mi (21.97 km^{2})
  - Land: 8.46 sq mi (21.92 km^{2})
  - Water: 0.015 sq mi (0.04 km^{2}) 0.19%
- Elevation: 1,358 ft (414 m)

Population (2020)
  - Total: 42,846
  - Density: 5,061.5/sq mi (1,954.26/km^{2})
- Time zone: UTC−8 (Pacific)
  - Summer (DST): UTC−7 (PDT)
- ZIP Codes: 91001, 91003
- Area code: 626
- FIPS code: 06-01290
- GNIS feature IDs: 1652662, 2407732

Altadena (/ˌɑːltəˈdiːnə/AL-tə-DEE-nə) is an unincorporated area and census-designated place in the San Gabriel Valley and the Verdugos regions of Los Angeles County, California, United States. Directly north of Pasadena, it is located approximately 14 miles (23 km) from Downtown Los Angeles. Its population was 42,846 at the 2020 census, up slightly from a 2010 figure of 42,777. In early 2025, the community was severely impacted by the Eaton Fire.

== History ==
=== Etymology ===
The name Altadena was coined by Byron O. Clark, who established Altadena Nursery in 1875. The name combines the Spanish alta, meaning "upper", with dena, a term he adapted from Pasadena. The area is adjacent to, but at a higher elevation than, Pasadena.

=== Early history ===
In the mid-1860s, Benjamin S. Eaton first developed water sources from the Arroyo Seco and Eaton Canyon to irrigate his vineyard near the edge of Eaton Canyon. This made possible the development of Altadena, Pasadena, and South Pasadena. He did the construction for B. D. Wilson and Dr. John Griffin, who jointly owned the Mexican land grant of Rancho San Pascual, about 14,000 acres (5,700 ha), that would be the future sites of those three communities. They hoped to develop and sell the land in a real estate plan called the San Pasqual Plantation. Their efforts failed by 1870, despite Eaton's irrigation ditch that drew water from the site of present-day Jet Propulsion Laboratory (JPL) in the Arroyo Seco, because the land was relatively inaccessible and few believed crops could thrive that close to the mountains.

Eaton tried to sell the land for the partners, and in late 1873, he helped broker a deal with Daniel Berry, who represented a group of investors from Indiana, to buy 4,000 acres (1,600 ha) of the rancho. That included the land of present-day Altadena, but they developed a 2,500-acre (1,000 ha) section farther south as Pasadena.

Byron O. Clark established a nursery in the foothills in 1875, which he named "Altadena Nursery", a name he coined from the Spanish alta meaning "upper" and dena from Pasadena.

In 1880 or 1881, Capt. Frederick Woodbury, and his brother, John Woodbury of Marshalltown, Iowa, purchased 937 acres (379 ha) known as the Woodbury Ranch. The land remained primarily agricultural, although several Eastern millionaires built mansions along Mariposa Street, and a small community developed through the 1890s and into the next century.

=== Development ===
Woodbury–Story House (1882), the home of Capt. John Woodbury, is extant and occupied.

John Woodbury established the Pasadena Improvement Company in 1887, with a plot plan of residential development referred to as the Woodbury Subdivision. They contacted Byron O. Clark, who had moved away, and asked if he could use the name "Altadena" for his subdivision; Clark agreed.

The newly sprouted community of Altadena immediately began to attract millionaires from the East. In 1887 Andrew McNally, the printing magnate from Chicago, and his friend, George Gill Green, had built mansions on what was to become Millionaire's Row: Mariposa Street near Santa Rosa Avenue. Newspaper moguls William Armiger Scripps and William Kellogg built homes side by side just east of Fair Oaks Avenue. A bit farther east, Zane Grey bought a home from Arthur Herbert Woodward, and added a second-floor study. The famous Benziger Publishing Company built a mansion on the corner of Santa Rosa Avenue (Christmas Tree Lane) and Mariposa. Mariposa was taken from the Spanish name for a butterfly. The grandson of Andrew McNally, Wallace Neff, became a famous Southern California architect. He started his career in Altadena with the design and construction of St. Elizabeth of Hungary Catholic Church (parish est. 1918), which was dedicated in October 1926.

From 1924 to 1926, 160 homes were built in Altadena by the fugitive conman Elisha Paul Janes, with distinctive steep roofs and multiple gables; despite his lack of qualifications, they proved popular, and the neighborhood was designated as a heritage area in 2002.

Many notable buildings followed in the 1930s, including Eliot Junior High School (1931) and Davies Community Center in Farnsworth Park (1934).

=== Later history ===
Redlining policies prevented African Americans from acquiring land or purchasing property in much of California. One of the areas exempt from these policies was Altadena Meadows, which thrived and became one of the first middle-class African American neighborhoods in the area.

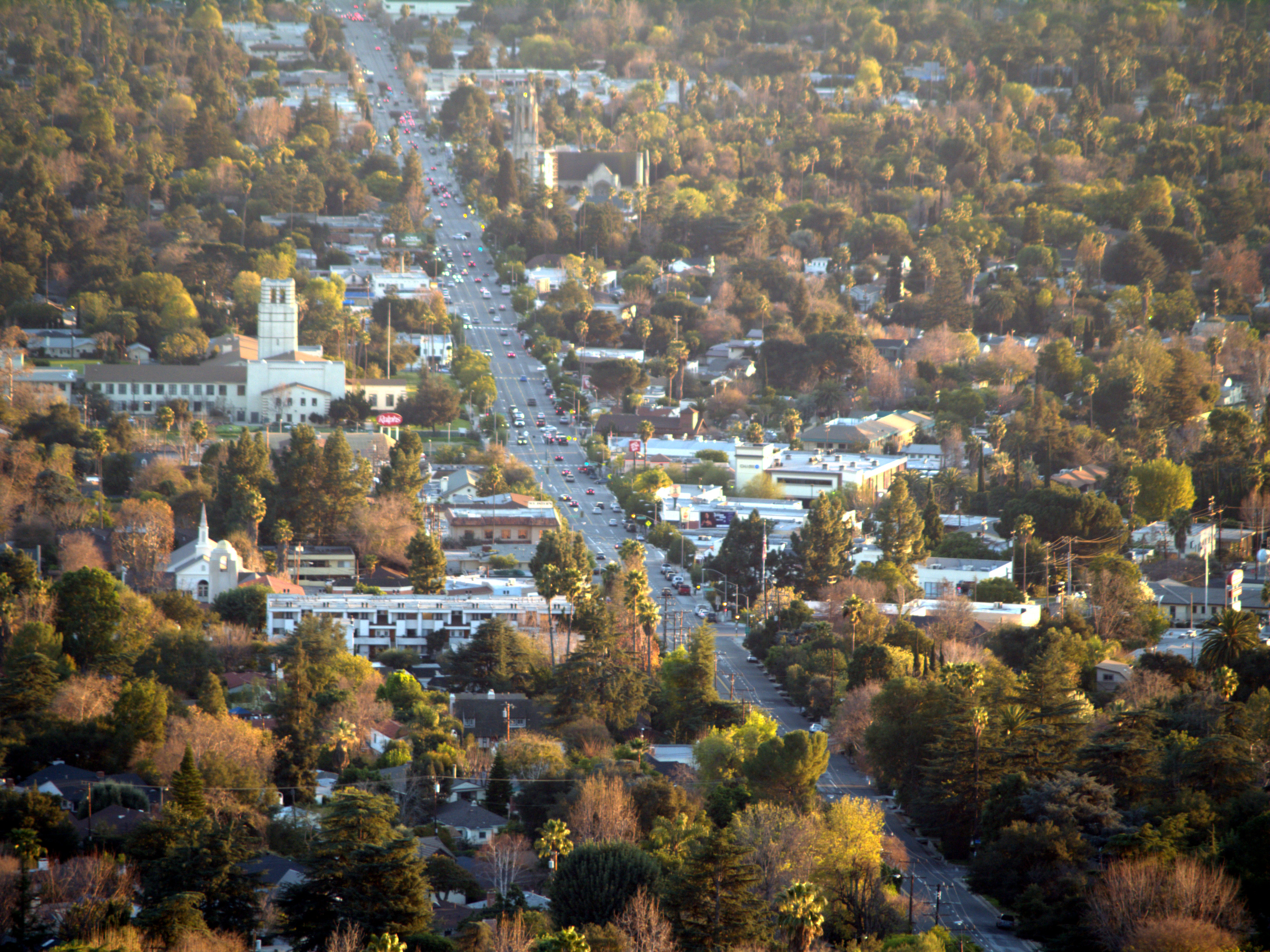
Lake Avenue in Altadena (2011).

While Altadena long refused wholesale annexation by neighboring Pasadena, the larger community nibbled at its edges in several small annexations of neighborhoods through the 1940s. Attempted annexation was stopped in 1956 by community campaigns though it has been resurrected several times since by Pasadena without success. Had the annexation succeeded, Pasadena would be the 108th largest city in the United States.

With early-1960s redevelopment in Pasadena, the routing of extensions of the 134 and 210 freeways, and lawsuits over the desegregation of Pasadena Unified School District, there was white flight and convulsive racial change in Altadena. In 1960, its black population was under four percent; over the next 15 years, half the White population left, and was replaced by people of color, many of whom settled on the west side of town after being displaced by Pasadena's redevelopment and freeway projects.

In 1993, the Kinneloa Fire, begun accidentally on the slopes above Eaton Canyon, burned dozens of homes in Altadena and neighboring Kinneloa Mesa as part of a rash of late October wildfires driven by Santa Ana winds in Southern California. One man died of complications from smoke inhalation and dozens were injured.

In 2022, Altadena gained local coverage in Los Angeles as the place of the first land return to the Tongva since the arrival of Europeans in the Los Angeles Basin area, after a resident donated her 1-acre property to the Tongva Taraxat Paxaavxa Conservancy. It was described as marking the first time in nearly 200 years that the Tongva have had land in Los Angeles County.

In 2022, a single lottery ticket was sold to Edwin Castro, which would win a world record US$2.04 billion Powerball jackpot, announced on November 7, 2022. After a few months of paperwork, on February 14, 2023, Castro publicly accepted the lump sum prize of US$997.6 million.

=== Eaton Fire (2025) ===
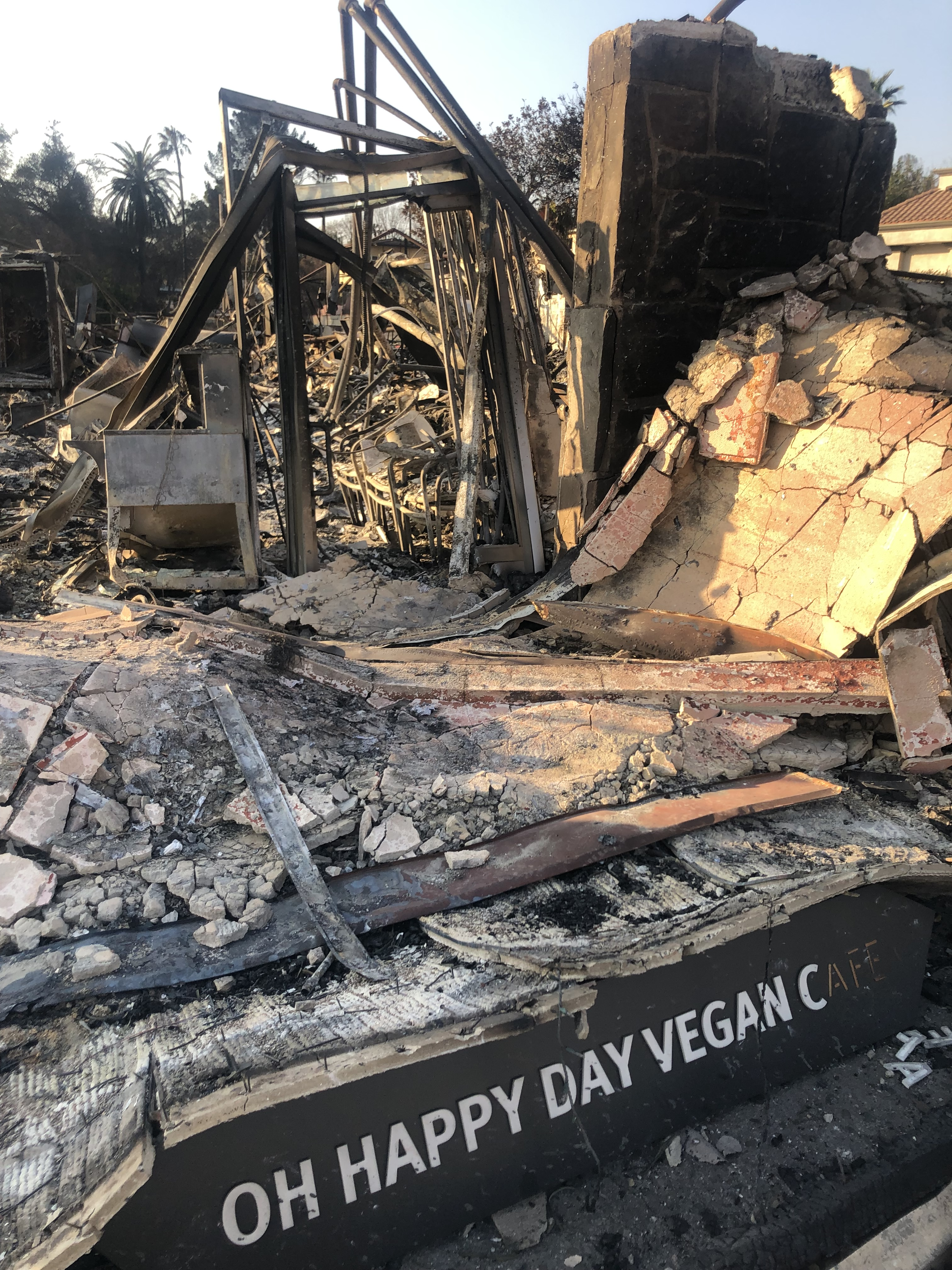
Destruction of business district on Lake Avenue.

On January 7, 2025, the Eaton Fire started in Altadena around 6:30 PM local time (PT) during powerful Santa Ana Winds. It quickly spread to 14,000 acres (5,700 ha) by January 10, with 19 confirmed fatalities.

Over 9,000 structures were damaged or destroyed, including the Andrew McNally House, Altadena Community Church, St. Mark's Episcopal Church, The Bunny Museum, and Scripps Hall, as well as much of the downtown area. The entirety of Altadena was put under an evacuation order.

In the aftermath of the fires, many homeowners struggled with high rebuilding costs, and some were forced to sell. Luxury developers and wealthy individuals scrambled to buy lots in cash at competitive prices. Community groups such as Altadena Not for Sale were quickly formed to advocate for the underinsured and uninsured to protect against land speculators.

Following the January 2025 Eaton Fire in Altadena, Powerball jackpot winner Edwin Castro began purchasing several fire-damaged lots in his hometown. Through his company, Castro announced plans to use a portion of his winnings to construct single-family homes for local residents while preserving the community’s architectural character and preventing speculative real-estate development. Castro's involvement in the rebuilding process has been met with both praise and concern from residents, who cite hopes for community recovery alongside worries about affordability and land consolidation.

== Geography ==
For statistical purposes, the United States Census Bureau has defined Altadena as a census-designated place (CDP). According to the United States Census Bureau, the CDP has a total area of 8.7 square miles (23 km^{2}), over 99% of which is land.

=== Climate ===
Altadena experiences hot and dry summers that are followed by warm and windy falls and mild winters. According to the Köppen climate classification system, Altadena has a hot-summer Mediterranean climate, abbreviated Csa on climate maps.

Climate data for Altadena, California (1991-2020 averages, 1922-2016 extremes)
Month	Jan	Feb	Mar	Apr	May	Jun	Jul	Aug	Sep	Oct	Nov	Dec	Year
Record high °F (°C)	93 (34)	92 (33)	98 (37)	105 (41)	104 (40)	113 (45)	110 (43)	107 (42)	111 (44)	108 (42)	101 (38)	93 (34)	113 (45)
Mean daily maximum °F (°C)	64.3 (17.9)	64.4 (18.0)	66.6 (19.2)	67.0 (19.4)	75.0 (23.9)	79.1 (26.2)	85.8 (29.9)	86.8 (30.4)	84.6 (29.2)	76.9 (24.9)	72.8 (22.7)	65.8 (18.8)	74.1 (23.4)
Mean daily minimum °F (°C)	42.3 (5.7)	43.9 (6.6)	44.8 (7.1)	45.9 (7.7)	50.2 (10.1)	52.9 (11.6)	57.7 (14.3)	59.1 (15.1)	58.4 (14.7)	51.8 (11.0)	48.5 (9.2)	44.6 (7.0)	50.0 (10.0)
Record low °F (°C)	21 (−6)	26 (−3)	29 (−2)	31 (−1)	32 (0)	41 (5)	45 (7)	43 (6)	41 (5)	36 (2)	26 (−3)	25 (−4)	21 (−6)
Average rainfall inches (mm)	4.80 (122)	5.74 (146)	3.19 (81)	1.29 (33)	0.74 (19)	0.21 (5.3)	0.08 (2.0)	0.01 (0.25)	0.18 (4.6)	0.91 (23)	1.18 (30)	3.04 (77)	21.37 (543.15)
Average rainy days (≥ 0.01 inch)	6.4	6.0	4.9	2.9	2.4	0.8	0.2	0.2	0.7	2.4	2.4	4.9	34.2
Source 1: WRCC
Source 2: WRCC

The wettest calendar year was 1983, with 48.47 inches (1,231.1 mm), and the driest was 1947, with 5.37 inches (136.4 mm). The most rainfall in one month was 19.70 inches (500.4 mm), in February 1980. The most rainfall in 24 hours was 7.70 inches (195.6 mm), on March 2, 1938. Altadena averages 21.09 inches (535.7 mm) of rain a year, over 6 inches (150 mm) more than nearby Los Angeles due to the orographic effect created by the San Gabriel Mountains. Because of the slope on which the city is built, sewer lines in the city's northern section have been known to overflow significantly.

== Demographics ==
Historical population
Census	Pop.	Note	%±
1960	40,568		—
1970	42,415		4.6%
1980	40,983		−3.4%
1990	42,658		4.1%
2000	42,610		−0.1%
2010	42,777		0.4%
2020	42,846		0.2%
U.S. Decennial Census; 1860–1870 1880-1890; 1900 1910 1920; 1930 1940 1950; 1960 1970 1980; 1990 2000 2010; 2020

Altadena first appeared as an unincorporated community in the 1960 U.S. census; and as a census-designated place in the 1980 United States census.

=== Racial and ethnic composition ===
Altadena CDP, California – Racial and ethnic composition Note: the US Census treats Hispanic/Latino as an ethnic category. This table excludes Latinos from the racial categories and assigns them to a separate category. Hispanics/Latinos may be of any race.
Race / Ethnicity (NH = Non-Hispanic)	Pop 1980	Pop 1990	Pop 2000	Pop 2010	Pop 2020	% 1980	% 1990	% 2000	% 2010	% 2020
White alone (NH)	18,237	18,494	16,848	17,231	17,900	45.02%	43.35%	39.54%	40.28%	41.78%
Black or African American alone (NH)	17,159	16,124	13,112	9,816	7,136	42.36%	37.80%	30.77%	22.95%	16.65%
Native American or Alaska Native alone (NH)	330	181	117	85	46	0.81%	0.42%	0.27%	0.20%	0.11%
Asian alone (NH)	1,206	1,722	1,761	2,231	2,919	2.98%	4.04%	4.13%	5.22%	6.81%
Native Hawaiian or Pacific Islander alone (NH)	1,206	1,722	49	65	47	2.98%	4.04%	0.11%	0.15%	0.11%
Other race alone (NH)	113	118	151	187	293	0.28%	0.28%	0.35%	0.44%	0.68%
Mixed race or Multiracial (NH)	x	x	1,882	1,660	2,334	x	x	4.42%	3.88%	5.45%
Hispanic or Latino (any race)	3,465	6,019	8,690	11,502	12,171	8.55%	14.11%	20.39%	26.89%	28.41%
Total	40,510	42,658	42,610	42,777	42,846	100.00%	100.00%	100.00%	100.00%	100.00%

=== 2020 census ===
As of the 2020 census, Altadena had a population of 42,846, with a population density of 5,060.9 inhabitants per square mile (1,954.0/km^{2}). The census reported that 98.3% of the population lived in households, 1.2% lived in non-institutionalized group quarters, and 0.5% were institutionalized. 99.7% of residents lived in urban areas, while 0.3% lived in rural areas.

The median age was 45.5 years; 18.6% of residents were under the age of 18, 7.1% were aged 18 to 24, 23.7% were aged 25 to 44, 30.1% were aged 45 to 64, and 20.5% were 65 years of age or older. For every 100 females there were 92.9 males, and for every 100 females age 18 and over there were 89.4 males age 18 and over.

There were 15,429 households, of which 29.7% had children under the age of 18 living in them. Married-couple households represented 50.9%, 15.0% had a male householder with no spouse or partner present, and 28.3% had a female householder with no spouse or partner present. About 22.2% of all households were made up of individuals and 10.6% had someone living alone who was 65 years of age or older. The average household size was 2.73. There were 11,055 families (71.7% of all households).

There were 16,063 housing units at an average density of 1,897.4 units per square mile (732.6 units/km^{2}), of which 3.9% were vacant. Of the 15,429 occupied units, 71.7% were owner-occupied and 28.3% were occupied by renters. The homeowner vacancy rate was 0.6%, and the rental vacancy rate was 3.0%.

Racial composition as of the 2020 census
Race	Number	Percent
White	19,785	46.2%
Black or African American	7,387	17.2%
American Indian and Alaska Native	381	0.9%
Asian	3,026	7.1%
Native Hawaiian and Other Pacific Islander	54	0.1%
Some other race	5,485	12.8%
Two or more races	6,728	15.7%

=== 2010 census ===
The 2010 United States census reported that Altadena had a population of 42,777. The population density was 4,900.4 inhabitants per square mile (1,892.1/km^{2}). The racial makeup of Altadena in the year 2010 was 22,569 (52.8%) White (40.3% Non-Hispanic White), 10,136 (23.7%) African American, 300 (0.7%) Native American, 2,307 (5.4%) Asian, 71 (0.2%) Pacific Islander, 4,852 (11.3%) from other races, and 2,542 (5.9%) from two or more races. There were 11,502 Hispanic or Latino residents, of any race (26.9%).

The Census reported that 42,276 people (98.8% of the population) lived in households, 234 (0.5%) lived in non-institutionalized group quarters, and 267 (0.6%) were institutionalized.

There were 15,212 households, out of which 5,170 (34.0%) had children under the age of 18 living in them, 7,684 (50.5%) were opposite-sex married couples living together, 2,210 (14.5%) had a female householder with no husband present, 814 (5.4%) had a male householder with no wife present. There were 661 (4.3%) unmarried opposite-sex partnerships, and 271 (1.8%) same-sex married couples or partnerships. 3,489 households (22.9%) were made up of individuals, and 1,318 (8.7%) had someone living alone who was 65 years of age or older. The average household size was 2.78. There were 10,708 families (70.4% of all households); the average family size was 3.26.

The age distribution of the city's population was as follows: 9,507 people (22.2%) were under the age of 18, 3,286 (7.7%) aged 18 to 24, 10,622 (24.8%) aged 25 to 44, 13,298 (31.1%) aged 45 to 64, and 6,064 (14.2%) who were 65 years of age or older. The median age was 41.8 years. For every 100 females, there were 93.1 males. For every 100 females age 18 and over, there were 89.2 males.

There were 15,947 housing units at an average density of 1,826.8 per square mile (705.3/km^{2}), of which 10,889 (71.6%) were owner-occupied, and 4,323 (28.4%) were occupied by renters. The homeowner vacancy rate was 0.9%; the rental vacancy rate was 4.9%. 30,319 people (70.9% of the population) lived in owner-occupied housing units and 11,957 people (28.0%) lived in rental housing units.

According to the 2010 United States Census, Altadena had a median household income of $82,895, with 10.7% of the population living below the federal poverty line.

=== Income ===
In 2023, the US Census Bureau estimated that the median household income was $129,123, and the per capita income was $65,192. About 5.3% of families and 7.4% of the population were below the poverty line.

== Government ==
Altadena has a town council that acts as an ombudsman for the Altadena neighborhoods, and provides a forum for town meetings. Altadena is formally managed by the Los Angeles County Supervisors, and is located in LA County Supervisorial District 5, under Supervisor Kathryn Barger.

== Arts and culture ==
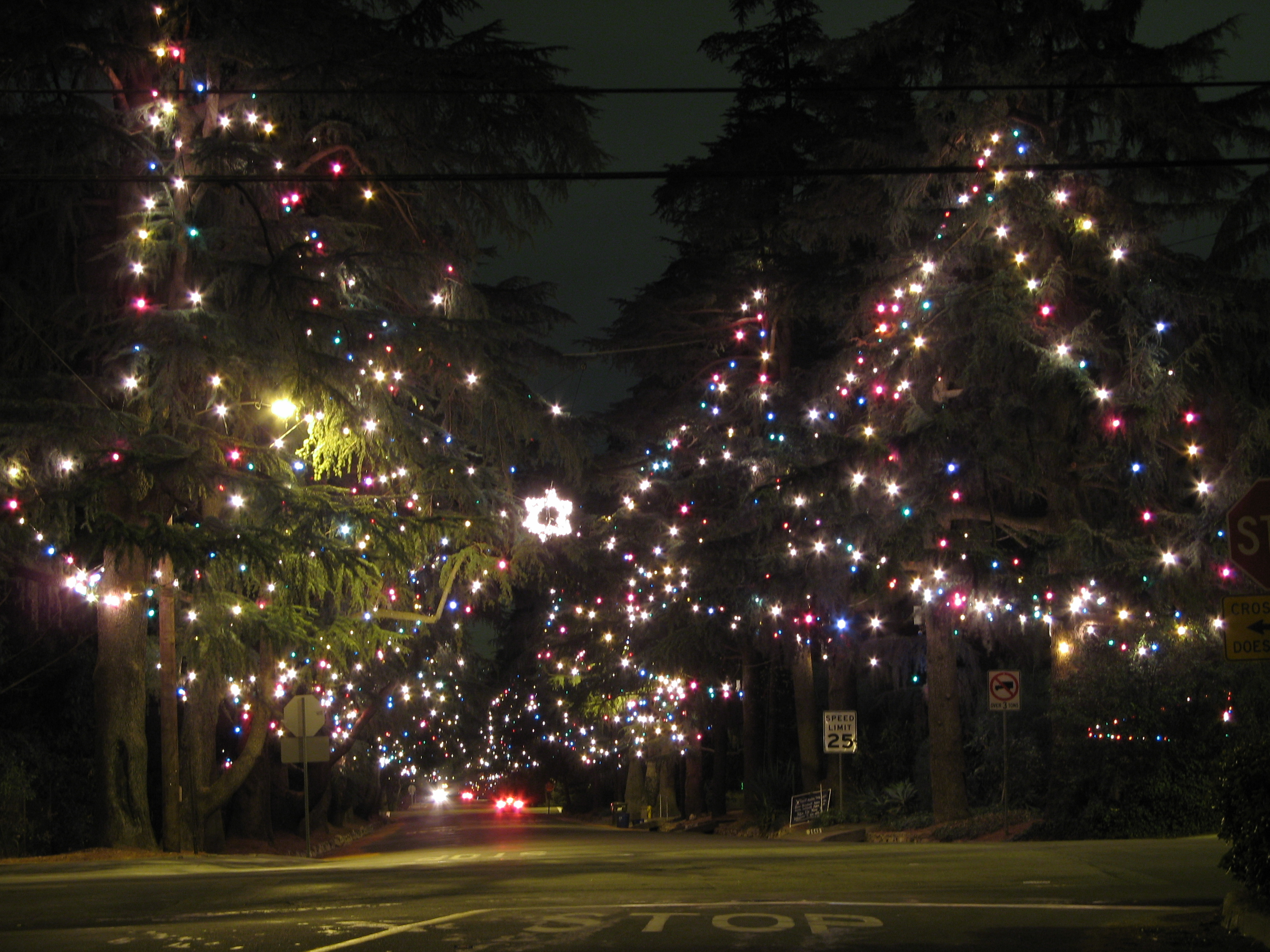
Christmas Tree Lane (2006).

Altadena is known for its community of artists and arts professionals, with artistic heritage dating back to the early 20th century.

Christmas Tree Lane is a 0.7-mile (1.1 km; 3,700 ft; 1,100 m) stretch of Santa Rosa Avenue from Woodbury Road to Altadena Drive. It has been a holiday attraction since 1920, and it is the oldest large-scale outdoor Christmas lighting venue in the world. Each December, members of the Christmas Tree Lane Association festoon the 110 still standing giant deodars that line the street with thousands of Christmas lights. Christmas Tree Lane was placed on the National Register of Historic Places in 1990, and is a California Historical Landmark.

Among Altadena's Christmas lighting attractions was the Balian Mansion, which drew people worldwide for tours of its Christmas lighting display. The Balian Mansion display was lit during the holiday season from 1955 to 2016, and is arguably the pioneer of home holiday lighting.

The historic Mount Lowe Railway was a scenic railway that once carried passengers to any of four resort hotels high in the San Gabriel Mountains above Altadena and Pasadena. The most direct trail to the sites, the Sam Merrill Trail, starts in Altadena at the top of Lake Avenue, and leads to Mount Echo, about 3 miles (5 km). Chaney Trail, just west of the intersection at Fair Oaks Avenue and Loma Alta Street, is a forestry service road leading to the old right of way. The Mount Lowe Railway site was placed on the National Register of Historic Places in 1993. Altadena has a number of hiking trails, including the trail to the Dawn Mine, which can be reached via Chaney Trail to Sunset Ridge Trail.

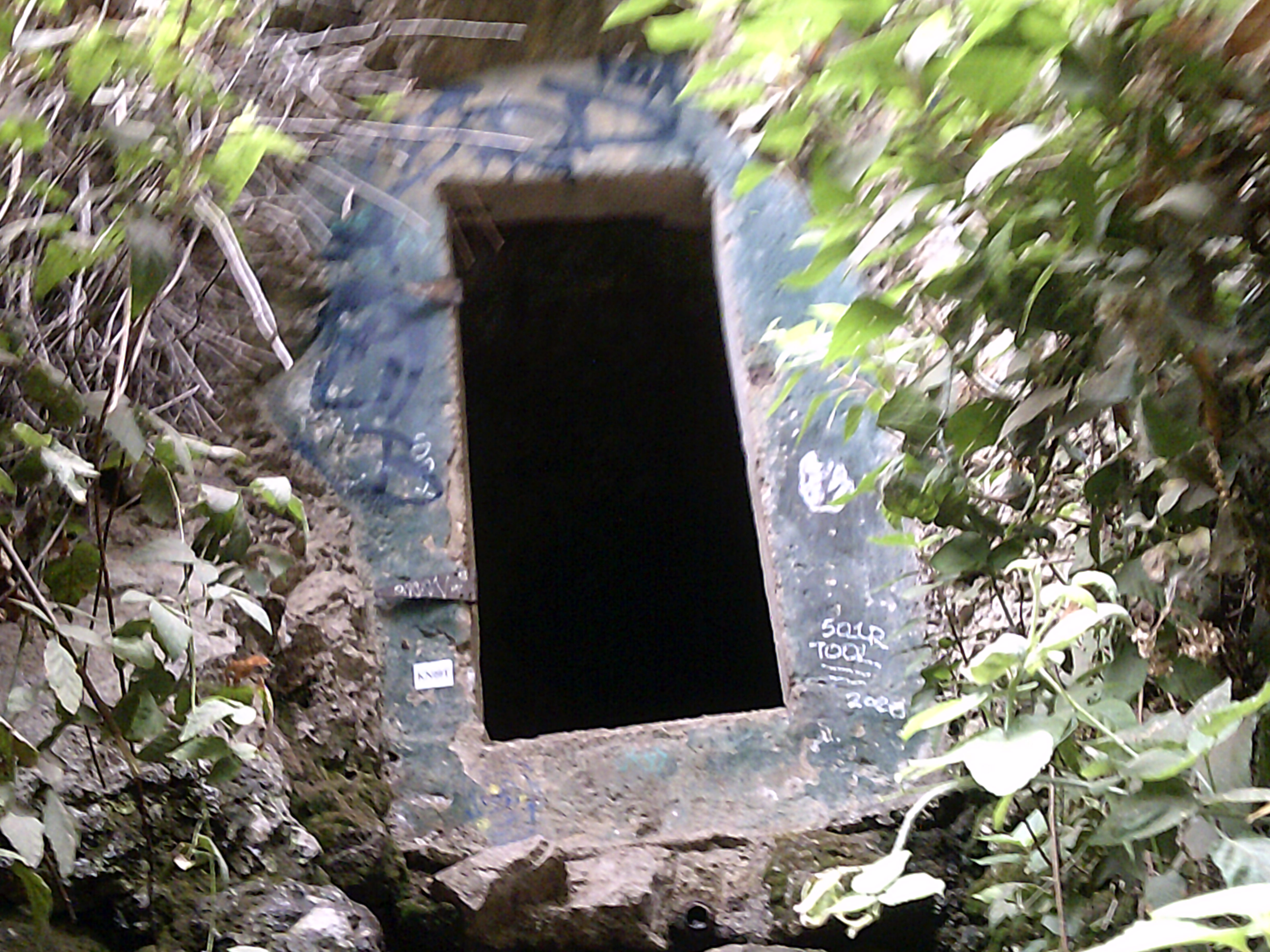
The entrance to what is likely a water hole dug for the Dawn Mine. It is located on the canyon wall somewhere along the Millard Falls Trail.

The Cobb Estate at the top of Lake Avenue is now a free botanical garden, operated by the United States Forest Service. It is guarded by its historic gates, which are easily bypassed to allow visitors and hikers to ascend its long and winding paved driveway to the site of what was once one of Altadena's premier mansions. This site is also found alongside the Sam Merrill Trail, which accesses Las Flores Canyon on the way to Echo Mountain.

Gen. Charles S. Farnsworth County Park, located on Lake Avenue, is a large county park that offers picnic grounds, play areas, and a clubhouse and amphitheater. It was placed on the National Register of Historic Places in 1997. The Rotary International chapter holds annual summer concerts in the amphitheater.

Crudely Hewn Tombstone is the final resting place of abolitionist and Harpers Ferry attack survivor Owen Brown. The Tombstone, which is the only known memorial for Owen Brown, reads: "Owen Brown, son of John Brown, the Liberator, died Jan. 9, 1889, aged 64 years." It is located on Round Top Hill near Brown Mountain in an isolated part of the Angeles National Forest.

The Bunny Museum held more than 35,000 rabbit-related items across 16 galleries in a 7,000-square-foot (650 m^{2}) space before it was destroyed in the Eaton Fire in 2025. Zorthian Ranch is a 48-acre (19 ha) artist colony that was also heavily damaged in the fire.

== Infrastructure ==
The Los Angeles County Sheriff's Department (LASD) operates the Altadena Station in Altadena.

The California Highway Patrol operates the Altadena Area Office on Windsor Dr. in Altadena.

Altadena is a shared jurisdiction where L.A. County Sheriff's Dept. handles crime-related calls and CHP handles traffic-related calls.

The Los Angeles County Department of Health Services operates the Monrovia Health Center in Monrovia, serving Altadena.

Pasadena Humane provides animal control services to Altadena.

== Notable people ==
- Claude Akins, actor
- Maria Bamford, stand-up comedian
- Ramses Barden, NFL player
- Al Boeke, architect and developer of Sea Ranch, California
- Aja Brown, former mayor of Compton, California
- Owen Brown, abolitionist
- Octavia E. Butler, author
- Ellen Garrison Jackson Clark, African American educator, abolitionist and early Civil Rights activist
- Edwin Castro (lottery winner)
- Andre Coleman, reporter and author
- Wah Chang, designer, sculptor, and artist
- Simone Cromer, internet personality
- Fannie Charles Dillon, composer
- Kenturah Davis, artist
- Nahshon Dion, writer and filmmaker
- Sterling Emerson (1900–1988), geneticist, died in Altadena
- Richard Feynman, Nobel Prize-winning physicist, was a resident
- Hollis Frazier-Herndon , musician known as 2hollis, credits spending time growing up in Altadena.
- Jonathan Gold, Pulitzer Prize-winning restaurant critic
- Zane Grey, author
- Keith Hufnagel, professional skateboarder, was a resident
- Rodney King, victim of police beating
- Otis Jackson Jr., musician known as Madlib
- Robert J. Lang, artist
- Bob Lillis, Major League Baseball player and coach
- Paul Little, adult entertainment director and actor
- Mo Martin, LPGA golfer
- Edgar McGregor, climate activist and amateur meteorologist
- Andrew McNally, businessman and publisher, died in Altadena
- Jim Merritt, Major League Baseball pitcher
- Sona Movsesian, executive assistant, author, and media personality
- Roger Nelson, Major League Baseball pitcher
- Marni Nixon, singer
- George Reeves, actor, Adventures of Superman
- Nathaniel Rosen, classical cellist
- Steve Sailer, author, blogger, and movie critic
- Michael Shermer, founder of The Skeptics Society and Editor in Chief of its magazine, Skeptic
- Ethelynde Smith, concert singer and botanical painter
- Adam Steltzner, spacecraft engineer
- Darryl Stephens, actor and author
- Jeffrey C. Stewart, Pulitzer Prize winner and professor
- Sharon Stouder, swimmer, three gold medals in 1964 Summer Olympics
- Meshach Taylor, Emmy-nominated actor, Designing Women
- Leslie Van Houten, Manson Family member serving life sentence for murder
- Mark Dean Veca, artist
- James Westerfield, actor
- Lou Wilson, actor, writer, and comedian
- Charles White, printmaker and draftsman
- Harold Zirin, solar astronomer, founder of the Big Bear Solar Observatory
- Jirayr Zorthian, artist
