= Georgia Guidestones =

Former granite monument in Georgia, US

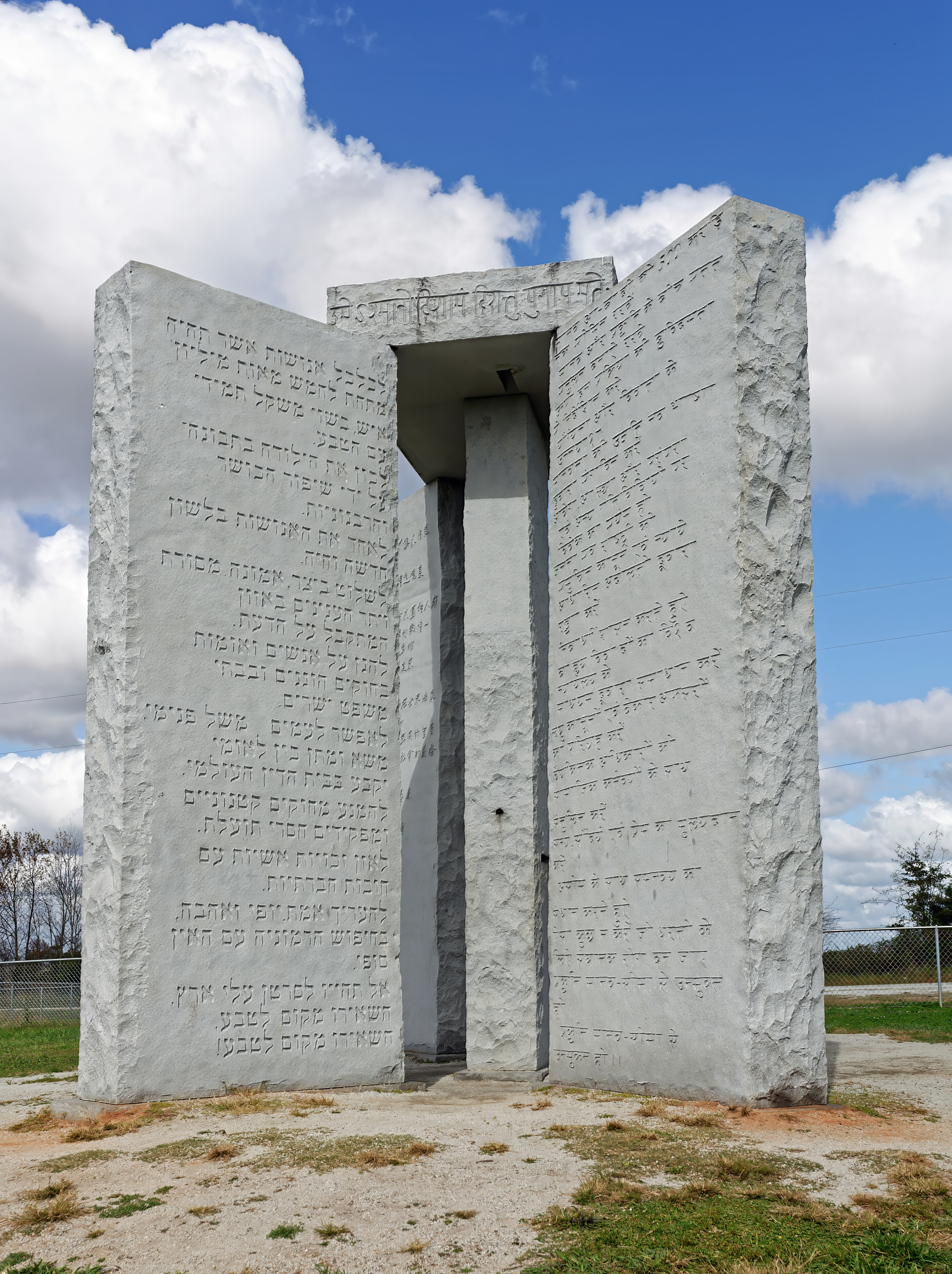
- Georgia Guidestones in 2020
- Interactive map of Georgia Guidestones
- Location: Elbert County, Georgia, US
- Coordinates: 34.23206°N 82.89440°W
- Material: Granite
- Height: 19 ft 3 in (5.87 m)
- Opening date: March 22, 1980
- Dismantled date: July 6, 2022

The Georgia Guidestones was a granite monument that stood in Elbert County, Georgia, United States, from 1980 to 2022. It was 19 feet 3 inches (5.87 m) tall and made from six granite slabs weighing a total of 237,746 pounds (107,840 kg). The structure was sometimes referred to as an "American Stonehenge". The monument's creators believed that there was going to be an upcoming social, nuclear, or economic calamity and they wanted the monument to serve as a guide for humanity in the world which would exist after it. Controversial from its time of construction, it ultimately became the subject of conspiracy theories which alleged that it was actually connected to Satanism, as opposed to Christianity as its creator claimed.

On the morning of July 6, 2022, the guidestones were heavily damaged in a bombing from a vandal, and the debris and guidestones were removed by the local government later that day. In late July, Elberton Mayor Daniel Graves announced plans to rebuild the monument. In August, the Elbert County Board of Commissioners voted to donate the remains of the monument to the Elberton Granite Association, and return the 5 acres (2 ha) of land on which the monument was erected to its previous owner.

== History ==
=== Construction ===
In June 1979, a man using the pseudonym Robert C. Christian approached the Elberton Granite Finishing Company and commissioned the structure, claiming to represent "a small group of loyal Americans who believe in God". Christian explained that the stones would function as a compass, calendar, and clock, and should be capable of "withstanding catastrophic events". The man reportedly used the pseudonym as a reference to the Christian religion. Christian said that he wanted to build a granite monument that would rival the British Neolithic monument Stonehenge, from which he drew inspiration after paying it a visit. However, he said that while it was impressive, Stonehenge had no message to communicate.

Joe Fendley of Elberton Granite believed that Christian was "a nut", and attempted to discourage him by providing a price quote for the commission which was several times higher than any project which the company had previously undertaken, explaining that the construction of the guidestones would require additional tools and consultants. To Fendley's surprise, Christian accepted the quote.

When arranging payment, Christian claimed that he represented a group which had been planning to construct the guidestones for 20 years and wanted to remain anonymous. Christian said he had chosen Elbert County because of its abundance of local granite, the rural nature of its landscape, its mild climate, and family ties to the region. The total cost of the project was not revealed, but it was over $100,000 (equivalent to $400,000 in 2025).

Christian delivered a scale model of the guidestones and ten pages of specifications. The five-acre (2.0 ha) site was purchased by Christian from a local farm owner. The owner and his children were given lifetime cattle grazing rights on the guidestones site. The monument was located off State Route 77 around seven miles (11 km) north of the city of Elberton.

On March 22, 1980, the monument was unveiled by congressman Doug Barnard before an audience of between 200 and 300 people. At the unveiling, the Master of Ceremonies read a message to the gathered audience:

In order to avoid debate, we the sponsors of the Georgia Guidestones have a simple message for human beings, now and for the future. We believe our precepts are sound, and they must stand on their own merits.

— Purported statement of Georgia Guidestones sponsors

Christian later transferred ownership of the land and the guidestones to Elbert County. In 1981, barbed wire fencing was erected around the monument to keep cattle out, as they had been using it for a scratching post.

A man who identified himself as Robert Christian published a book titled Common Sense Renewed (1986), which described the ideology of the guidestones. The author wrote:

I am the originator of the Georgia Guidestones and the sole author of its inscriptions. I have had the assistance of a number of other American citizens in bringing the monument into being. We have no mysterious purposes or ulterior motives. We seek common sense pathways to a peaceful world, without bias for particular creeds or philosophies.

— "Robert Christian" (1986)

Fendley believed that the monument would become a regional tourist attraction. In 2022, 20,000 annual visitors were reported.

Dark Clouds Over Elberton: The True Story of the Georgia Guidestones (2015) is a documentary film purporting to expose the true identity of Robert Christian. The makers of the documentary claimed to have investigated and interviewed a banker who was involved in the financial arrangements for the construction of the monument.

=== Reaction ===
The stones defaced with aerosol paint and graffiti

In 2008, the stones were defaced with aerosol paint and graffiti with slogans such as "Death to the New World Order". Wired magazine called the defacement "the first serious act of vandalism in the guidestones' history". In September 2014, an employee of the Elbert County maintenance department contacted the Federal Bureau of Investigation when the stones were vandalized with graffiti including the phrase: "I Am Isis, goddess of love." After the acts of vandalism, security cameras were installed on the site.

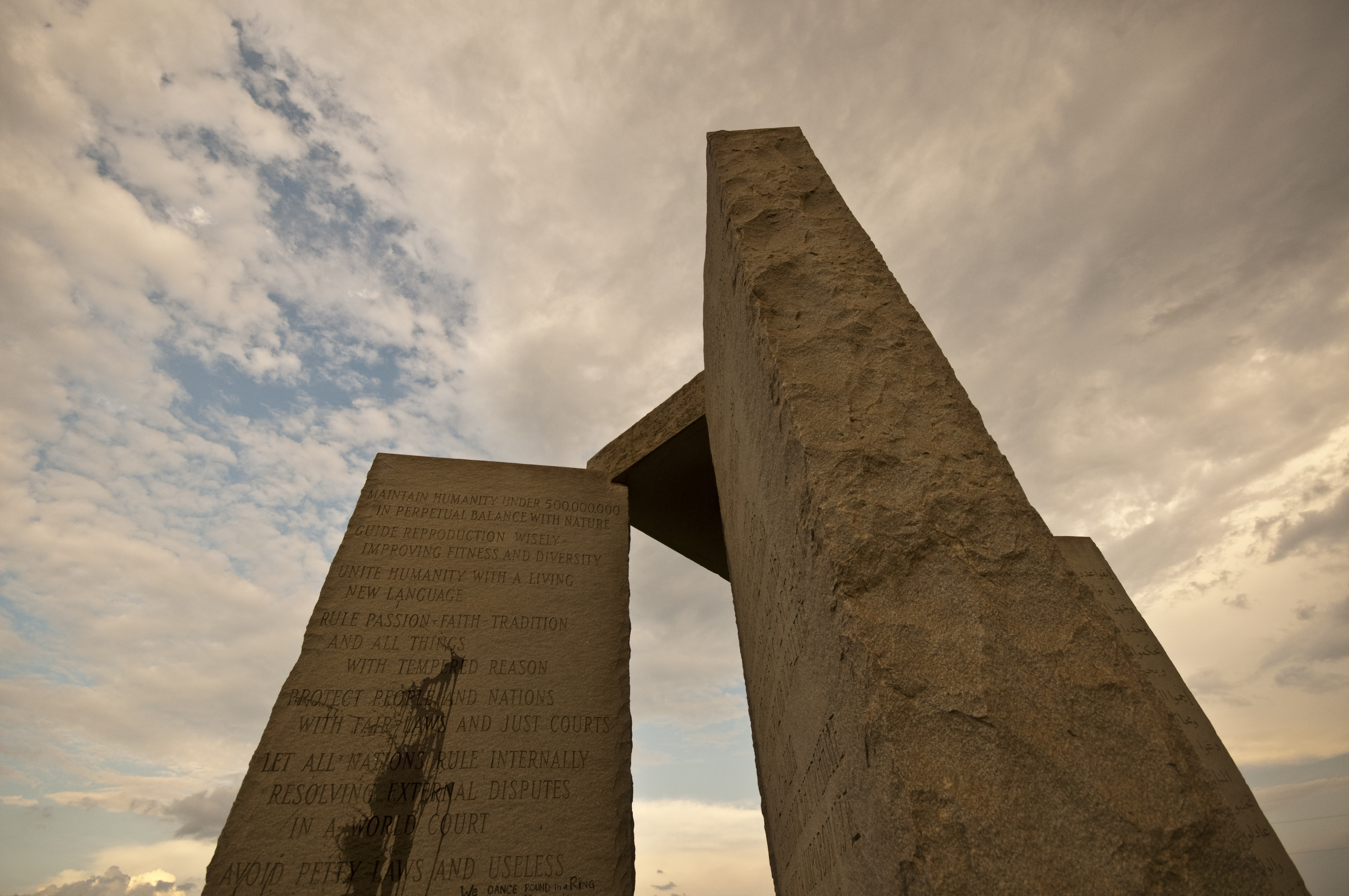
The Guidestones defaced with paint in 2009

Kandiss Taylor, a candidate in the 2022 Georgia Republican gubernatorial primary, called the Guidestones "Satanic" in a campaign ad; her campaign platform called for the monument to be removed.

=== Destruction ===
Footage of the bombing of the Georgia Guidestones monument, July 6, 2022

On July 6, 2022, an explosive device was detonated at the site, destroying the Swahili/Hindi language slab and causing significant damage to the capstone. Nearby residents reportedly heard and felt explosions at around 4:00 a.m. CCTV footage recorded a vehicle leaving the scene and police investigated the incident. The remaining stones were dismantled by authorities for safety reasons later in the day with a backhoe, according to the Georgia Bureau of Investigation (GBI). The Elberton Star reported that digging showed no evidence that there was ever a time capsule located beneath the Georgia Guidestones.

==== Aftermath ====
The Elbert County Sheriff's Office investigated the bombing, with assistance from the GBI. On the evening of the bombing, the GBI released a video showing both the explosion, and a vehicle of interest leaving the scene shortly before. No motive has been publicly shared, and no suspects publicly identified. On July 14, 2022, and again on July 25, 2022, the GBI gave an update, with no significant progress on the case being made since the bombing. Prosecutors suggested that as the guidestones were maintained by the county, they were considered a public building, thus their destruction would carry a minimum sentence of 20 years in prison.

In late July 2022, Elberton Mayor Daniel Graves said the town planned to rebuild the monument exactly as it was, adding "We're just getting geared up and excited about rebuilding them. It's going to happen. It may take us six months to a year to do it, but we are going to do it." On August 8, 2022, the Elberton city council voted to begin legal proceedings to return the five acres of land the monument had been built on to its previous owner, a local farm. The city council announced that the remains of the monument, which had been moved to a third-party location for safety reasons, would be given to the Elberton Granite Association. Both the Elberton Granite Association and the Elberton city council expressed doubt that the guidestones would be rebuilt, but expressed hope that one day it could happen.

== Description ==
=== Inscriptions ===
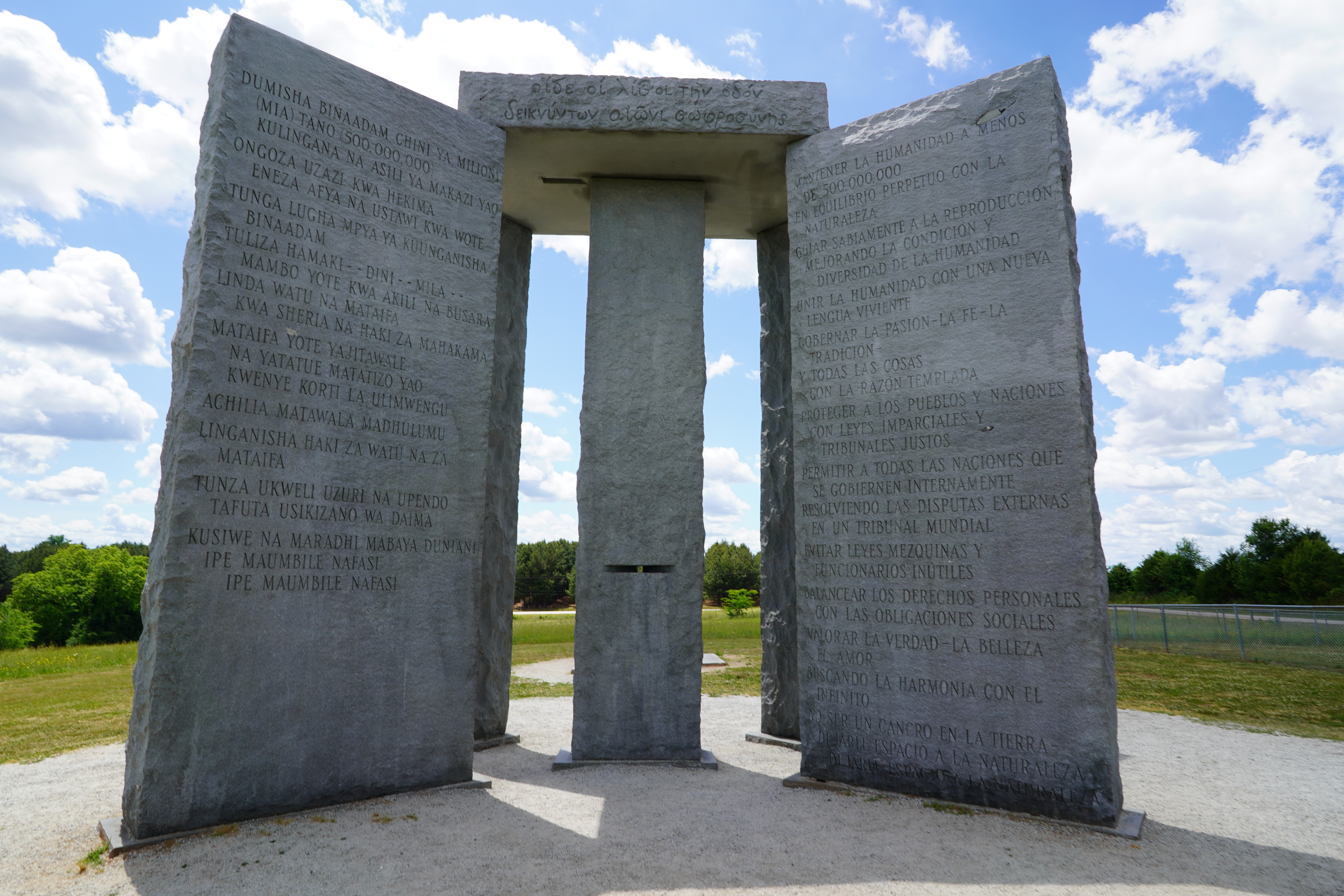
Inscriptions as laid out on the Guidestones

A message consisting of a set of ten guidelines or principles was engraved on the Georgia Guidestones in eight different languages, one language on each face of the four large upright stones. Moving clockwise around the structure from due north, these languages were English, Spanish, Swahili, Hindi, Hebrew, Arabic, Traditional Chinese, and Russian. The languages were chosen because they represented most of humanity, except for Hebrew, which was chosen because of its connections to Judaism and Christianity.

According to the monument's sponsors, the inscriptions are meant to guide humanity to conserve nature after a nuclear war, which the creators thought was an imminent threat. The inscriptions dealt with four main themes: "governance and the establishment of a world government, population and reproduction control, the environment and humankind's relationship to nature, and spirituality."

The inscriptions read:

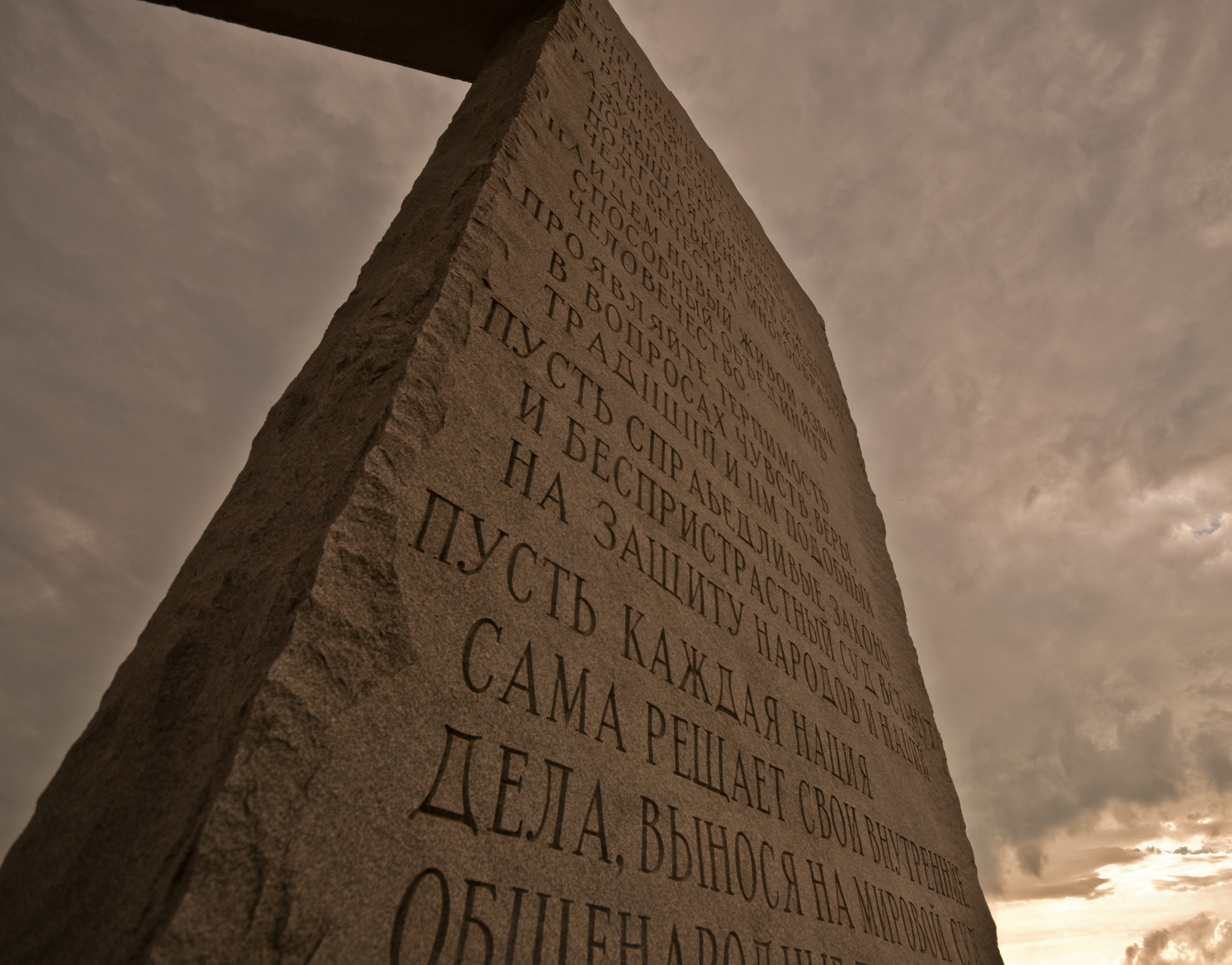
Russian inscriptions

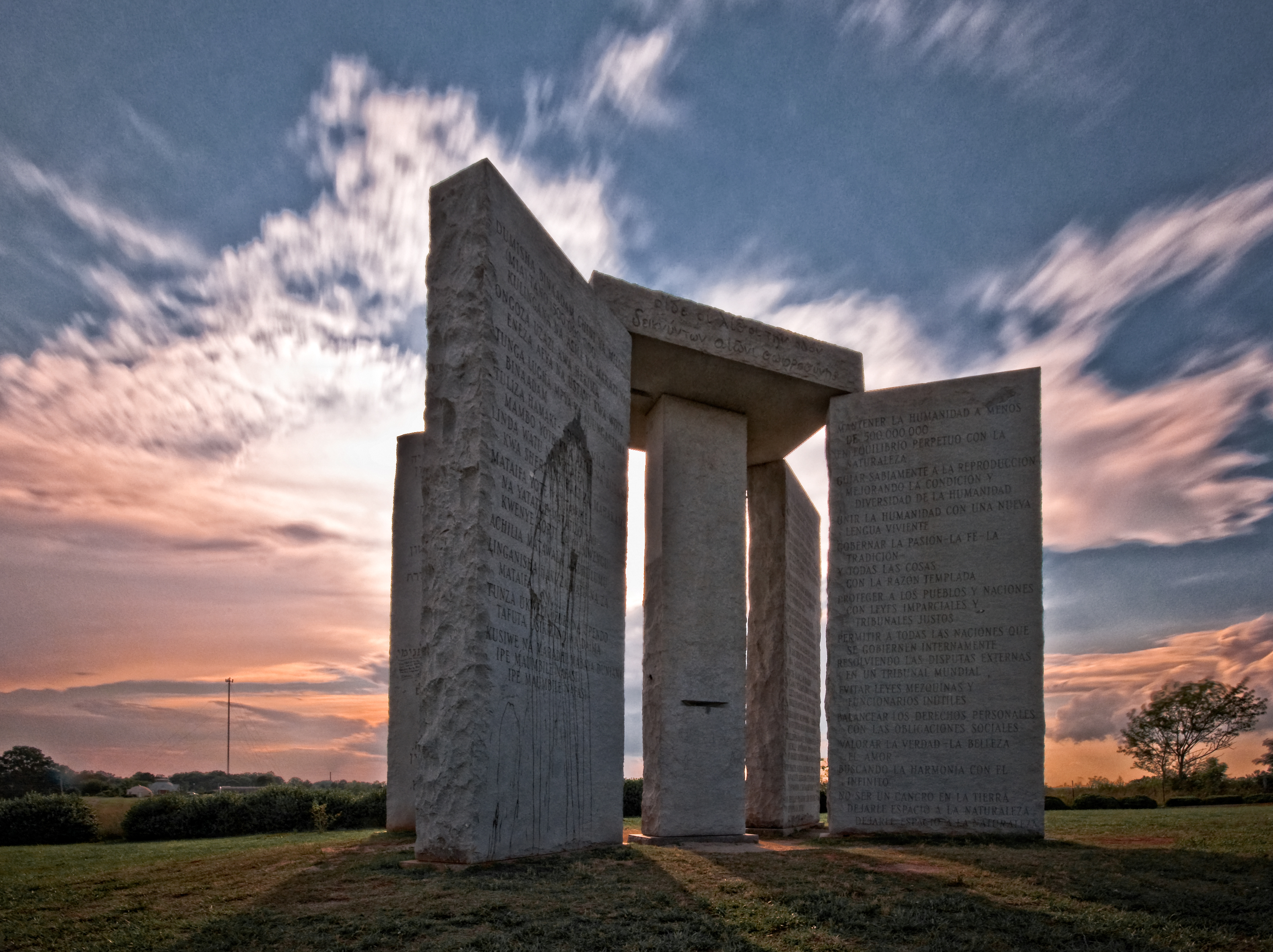
The Guidestones as they stood in 2009

Maintain humanity under 500,000,000 in perpetual balance with nature.

Guide reproduction wisely – improving fitness and diversity.

Unite humanity with a living new language.

Rule passion – faith – tradition – and all things with tempered reason.

Protect people and nations with fair laws and just courts.

Let all nations rule internally resolving external disputes in a world court.

Avoid petty laws and useless officials.

Balance personal rights with social duties.

Prize truth – beauty – love – seeking harmony with the infinite.

Be not a cancer on the Earth – Leave room for nature – Leave room for nature.

=== Explanatory tablet ===
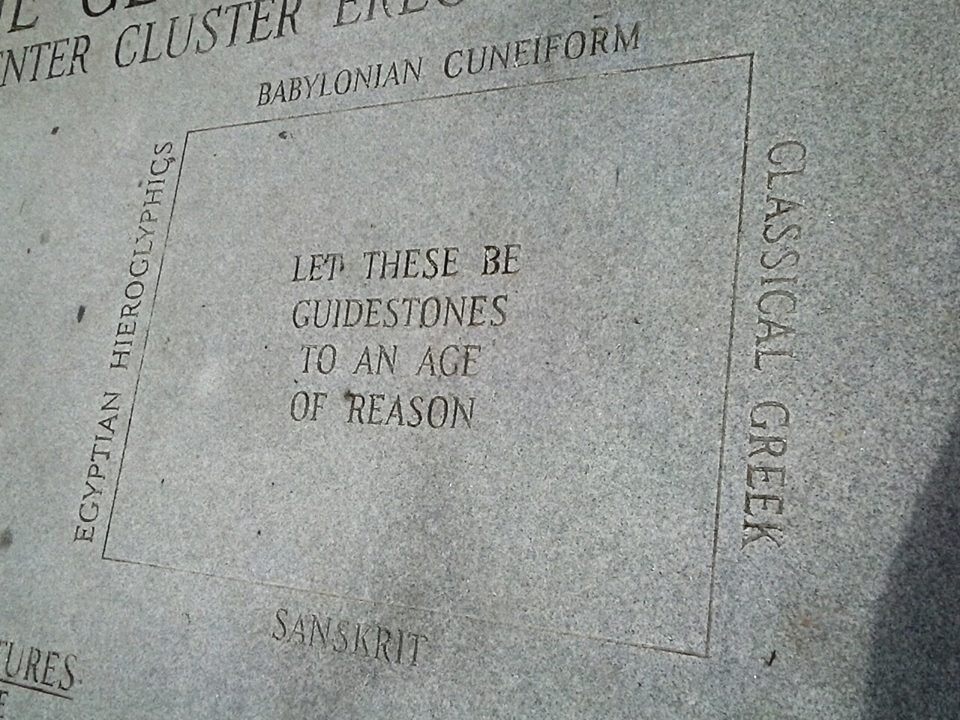
An explanatory tablet was set alongside the stones.

A few feet to the west of the monument, an additional granite ledger had been set level with the ground. This tablet identified the structure and the languages used on it and listed various facts about the size, weight, and astronomical features of the stones, the date it was installed, and the sponsors of the project. It referred to a time capsule buried under the tablet, but blank spaces on the stone intended for filling in the dates on which the capsule was buried and was to be opened had not been inscribed, so it was uncertain if the time capsule was ever actually put in place. During the removal of the monument in July 2022, county officials dug six feet down underneath this tablet to check for a time capsule, but found nothing.

The text of the explanatory tablet was somewhat inconsistent with respect to punctuation and misspelled the word "pseudonym". The original spelling, punctuation, and line breaks in the text have been preserved in the transcription (letter case is not). At the top center of the tablet was written:

The Georgia Guidestones

Center cluster erected March 22, 1980

Immediately below this was the outline of a square, inside which was written:

Let these be guidestones to an Age of Reason

Around the edges of the square were written translations to four ancient languages, one per edge. Starting from the top and proceeding clockwise, they were: Babylonian (in cuneiform script), Classical Greek, Sanskrit and Ancient Egyptian (in hieroglyphs).

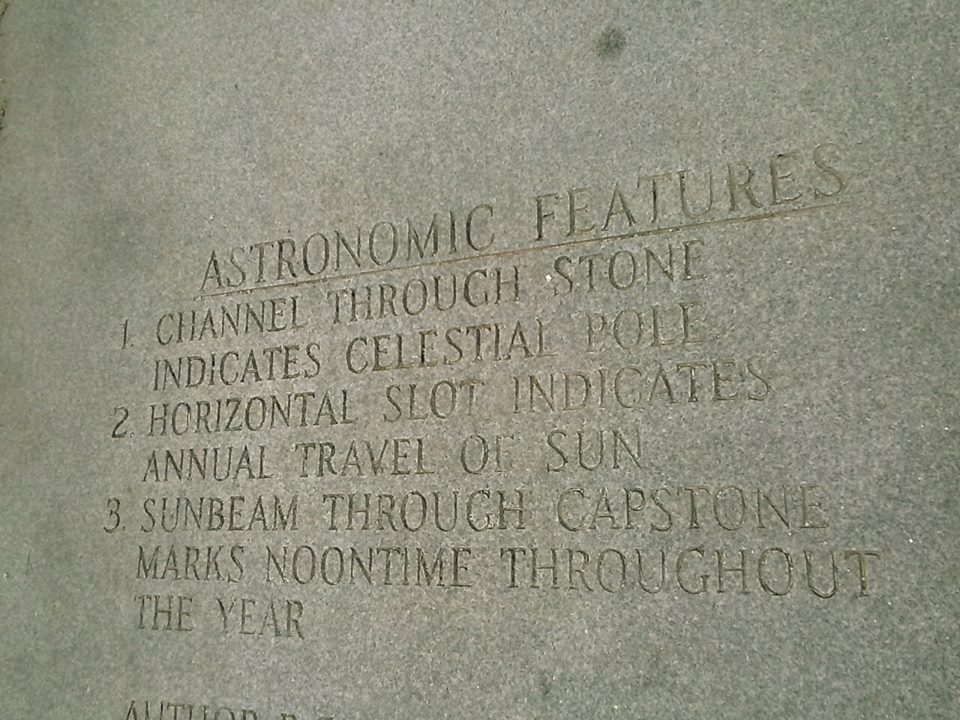
The guidestones' "Astronomic features"

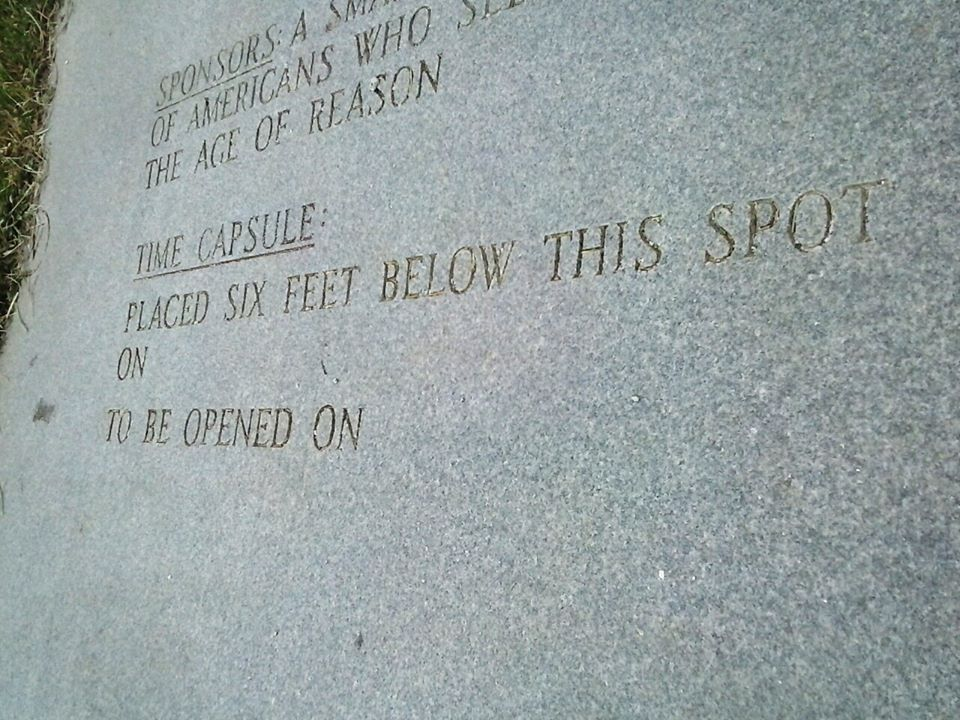
Undated instructions for the site's time capsule

On the left side of the tablet was a column of text (metric conversion added):

Astronomic features

1. Channel through stone
indicates celestial pole
2. Horizontal slot indicates
annual travel of sun
3. Sunbeam through capstone
marks noontime throughout
the year

Author: R.C. Christian
(a pseudonyn) [sic]

Sponsors: A small group
of Americans who seek
the Age of Reason

Time Capsule
Placed six feet [1.83 m] below this spot
On
To be opened on

The words appeared as shown under the time capsule heading; no dates were engraved.

=== Physical data ===
On the right side of the tablet was a column of text (metric conversions added):

PHYSICAL DATA

1. OVERALL HEIGHT – 19 FEET 3 INCHES [5.87 m].
2. TOTAL WEIGHT – 237,746 POUNDS [107,840 kg].
3. FOUR MAJOR STONES ARE 16 FEET,
FOUR INCHES [4.98 m] HIGH, EACH WEIGHING
AN AVERAGE OF 42,437 POUNDS [19,249 kg].
4. CENTER STONE IS 16 FEET, FOUR-
INCHES [4.98 m] HIGH, WEIGHS 20,957
POUNDS [9,506 kg].
5. CAPSTONE IS 9-FEET, 8-INCHES [2.95 m]
LONG, 6-FEET, 6-INCHES [1.98 m] WIDE;
1-FOOT, 7-INCHES [0.48 m] THICK. WEIGHS
24,832 POUNDS [11,264 kg].
6. SUPPORT STONES (BASES) 7-FEET,
4 INCHES [2.24 m] LONG 2-FEET [0.61 m] WIDE.
1 FOOT, 4-INCHES [0.41 m] THICK, EACH
WEIGHING AN AVERAGE OF 4,875
POUNDS [2,211 kg].
7. SUPPORT STONE (BASE) 4-FEET,
2½ INCHES [1.28 m] LONG, 2-FEET, 2-INCHES [0.66 m]
WIDE, 1-FOOT, 7-INCHES [0.48 m] THICK.
WEIGHT 2,707 POUNDS [1,228 kg].
8. 951 CUBIC FEET [26.9 m³] GRANITE.
9. GRANITE QUARRIED FROM PYRAMID
QUARRIES LOCATED 3 MILES [5 km] WEST
OF ELBERTON, GEORGIA.

=== Guidestone languages ===
Below the two columns of text were written the caption "GUIDESTONE LANGUAGES", with a diagram of the granite slab layout beneath it. The names of eight modern languages were inscribed along the long edges of the projecting rectangles, one per edge. Starting from due north and moving clockwise around so that the upper edge of the northeast rectangle was listed first, they were English, Spanish, Swahili, Hindi, Hebrew, Arabic, Chinese, and Russian. At the bottom center of the tablet was the text:

Additional information available at Elberton Granite Museum & Exhibit

College Avenue
Elberton, Georgia

=== Astronomical features ===
The four outer stones were oriented to mark the limits of the 18.6 year lunar declination cycle. The center column featured a hole drilled at an angle from one side to the other, through which the North Star could be seen. The same pillar had a slot carved through it which was aligned with the Sun's solstices and equinoxes. A 7/8-in (22 mm) aperture in the capstone allowed a ray of sun to pass through at noon each day, shining a beam on the center stone indicating the day of the year. University of Georgia Astronomer Loris Magnani referred to these features as "mediocre at best" and sees them as "an abacus compared to Stonehenge’s computer".

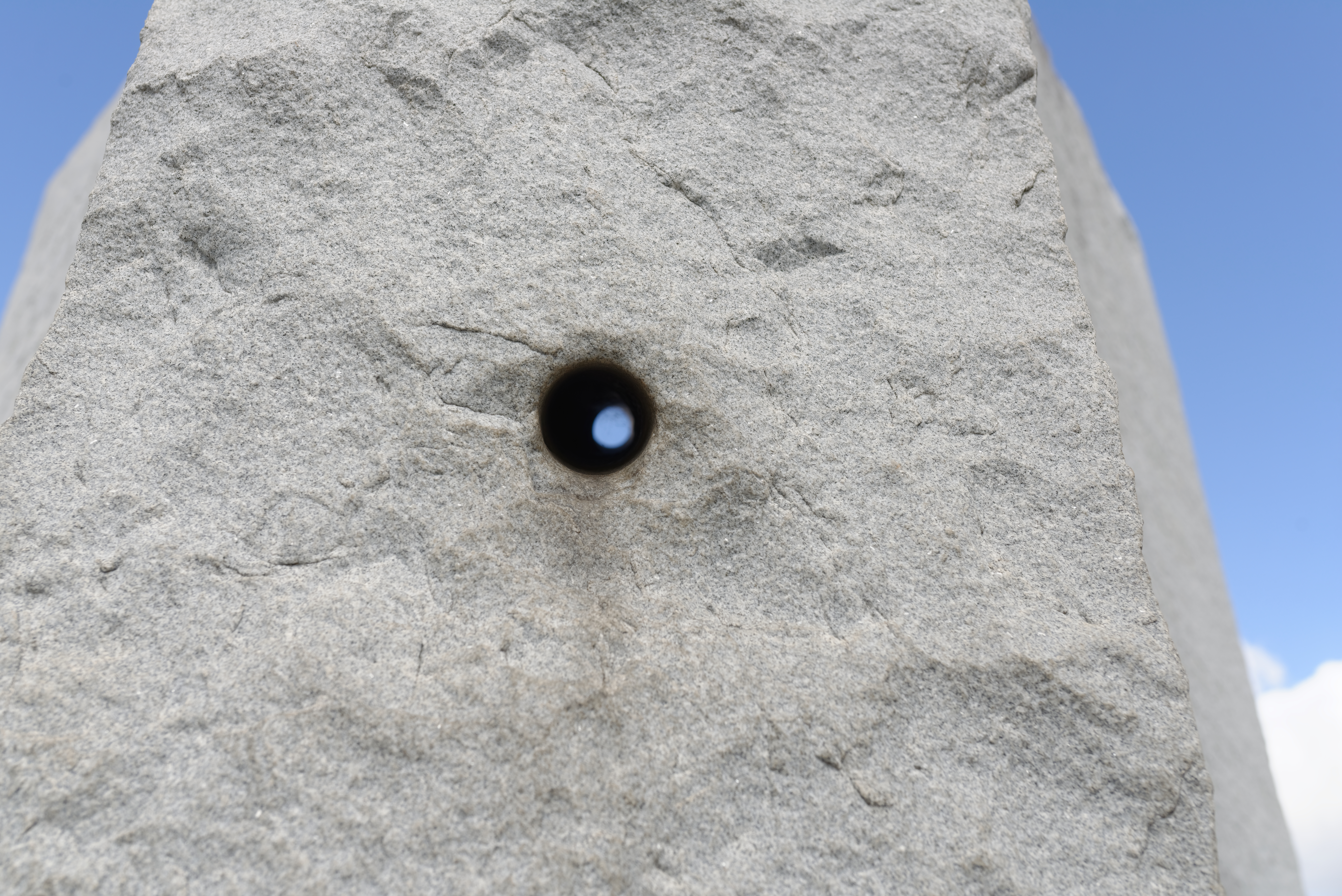
Hole

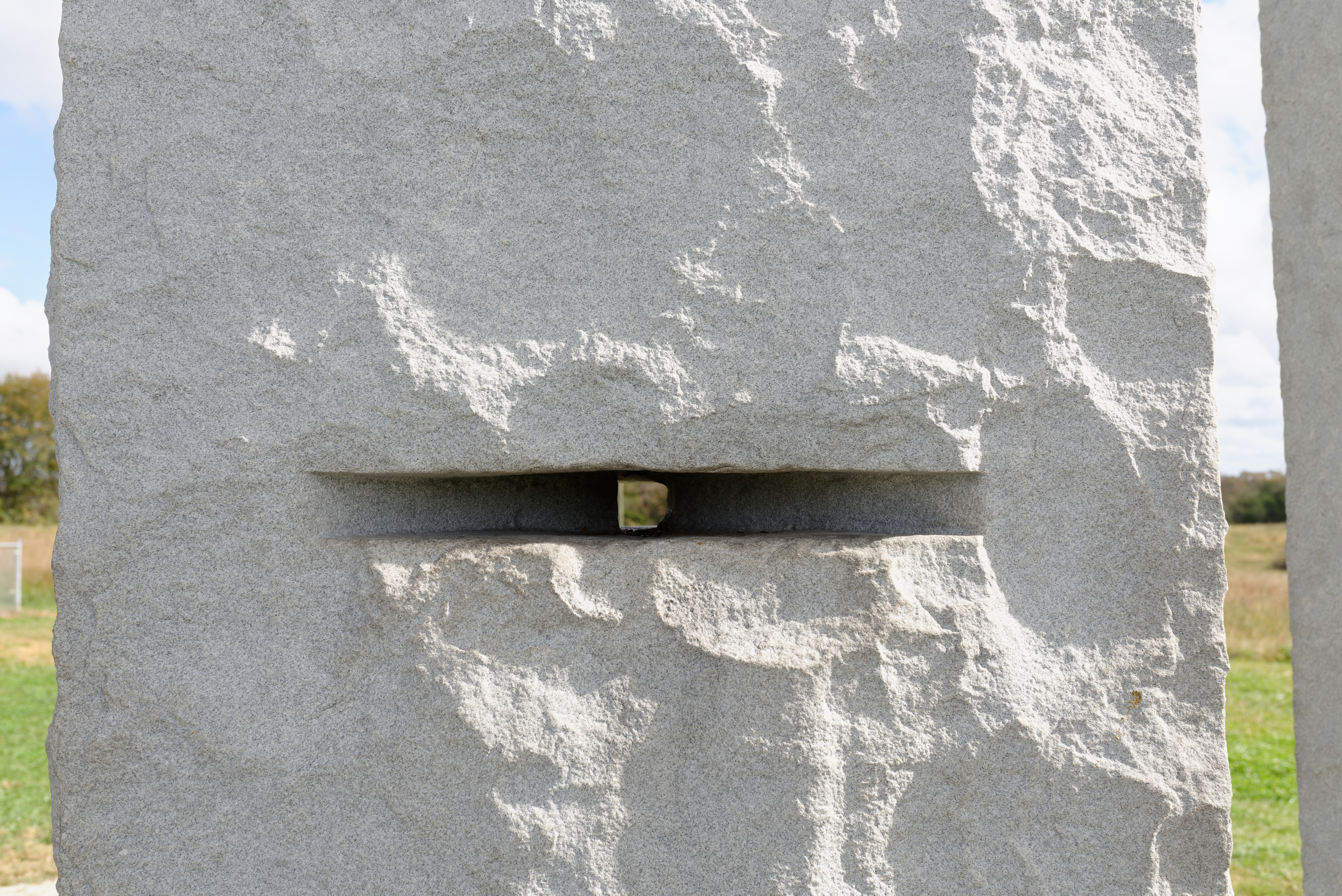
Slot

== Interpretations ==
When commissioning the guidestones, Christian described them as a guide for future generations to manage limited resources, potentially in the face of nuclear war. Yoko Ono said the inscribed messages were "a stirring call to rational thinking". However, the guidestones' inscriptions have also been accused of promoting eugenics and genocide.

=== Conspiracy theories ===
The guidestones became a subject of interest for conspiracy theorists. Wired stated that unspecified opponents have labeled them the "Ten Commandments of the Antichrist". Some conservative Christians have called the monument Satanic.

Right-wing activist Mark Dice demanded that the guidestones should "be smashed into a million pieces, and then the rubble should be used for a construction project", claiming that the guidestones are of "a deep Satanic origin", and that R. C. Christian belongs to "a Luciferian secret society" related to the New World Order. At the unveiling of the monument, a local minister proclaimed that he believed that the monument was "for sun worshipers, for cult worship and for devil worship".

Conspiracy theorist Jay Weidner has said that the pseudonym of the man who commissioned the stones – "R. C. Christian" – resembles Rose Cross Christian, or Christian Rosenkreuz, the founder of the Rosicrucian Order. Others who agree with Weidner point to the Rosicrucian's first manifesto written in 1614, which states “The word R.C. should be their seal, mark and character”. They also see similarities between the writing on the capstone, and the title of Thomas Paine's The Age of Reason.

== See also ==
- America's Stonehenge
- List of destroyed heritage of the United States
- Long-term nuclear waste warning messages
- Stonehenge replicas and derivatives
- Tablets of Stone
- Utah monolith
