= United States Post Office (Mayfield, Kentucky) =

- U.S. Post Office
- U.S. National Register of Historic Places
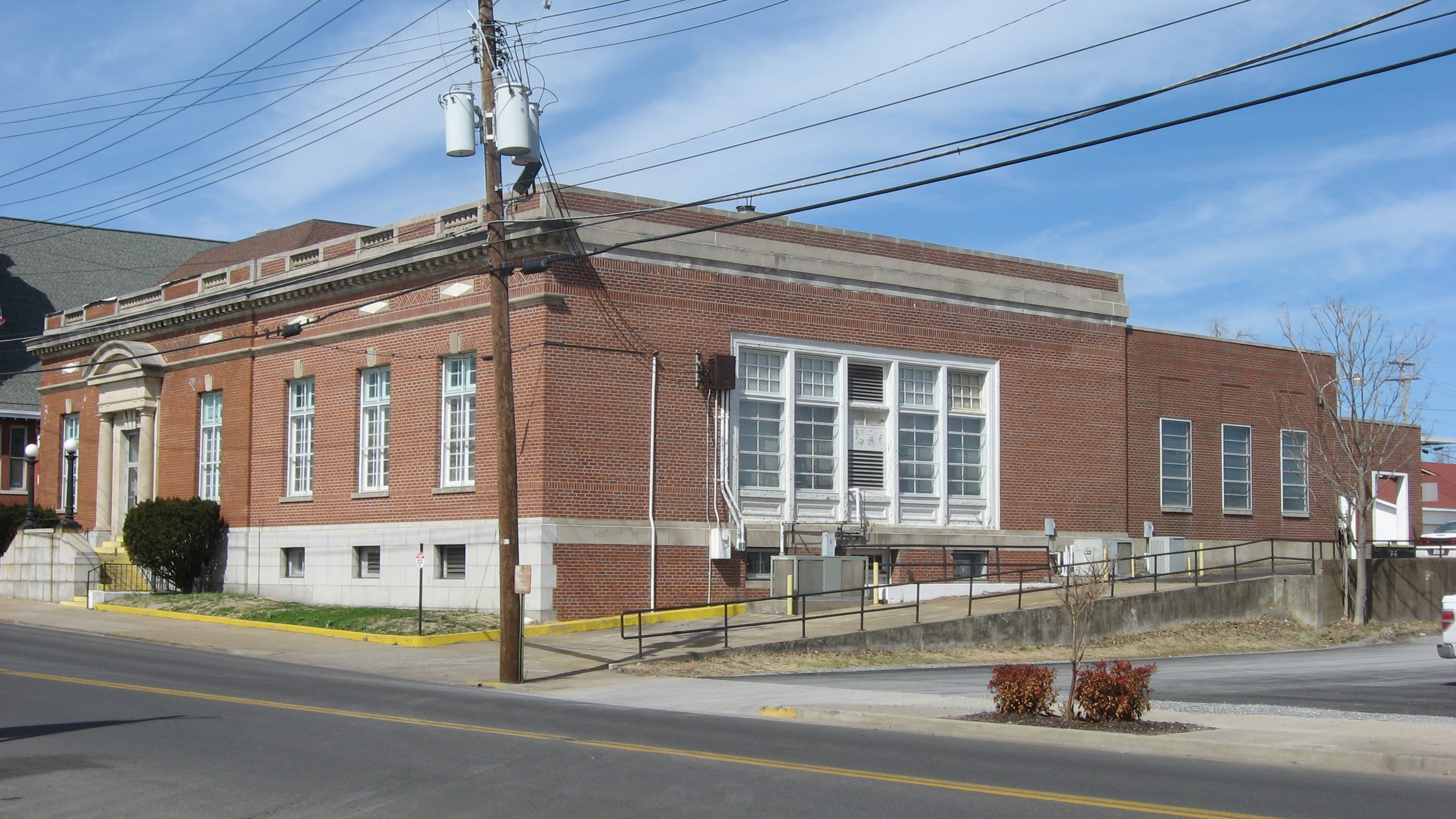

- Location within Kentucky Location within the United States
- Location: 9th St. and Broadway, Mayfield, Kentucky
- Coordinates: 36°44′31″N 88°38′18″W
- Area: 0.4 acres (0.16 ha)
- Built: 1910
- Built by: McHenry-Beatty Company
- Architectural style: Classical Revival
- NRHP reference No.: 82001566
- Added to NRHP: December 2, 1982

The U.S. Post Office in Mayfield, Kentucky was built in 1910. It was listed on the National Register of Historic Places in 1982.

The Post Office, along with much of downtown Mayfield, was destroyed by a long-track EF4 tornado on December 10, 2021.
