= Edgar McGregor =

American climate activist and amateur meteorologist

- Born: Pasadena, California, U.S.
- Education: Pasadena City College; San Jose State University
- Known for: Climate activism, meteorology

Edgar McGregor is an American climate activist and meteorologist from Pasadena, California. He works for the Los Angeles County Department of Parks and Recreation as a recreation services leader. Starting in 2019, his long-term volunteer efforts to clean up Eaton Canyon and other public parks removed thousands of pounds of trash over several years. In 2023, McGregor began providing localized weather forecasts through social media and the Altadena Weather and Climate Facebook page. His warnings during the Eaton Fire in 2025 were credited with helping residents evacuate and avoid harm.

== Early life and education ==
McGregor was born to Edgar McGregor III and Melinda McGregor in Pasadena, California. As a child, he developed an interest in weather, often walking in the rain and observing weather patterns. His fascination with extreme weather was heightened after experiencing a severe Santa Ana windstorm in December 2011, which caused substantial damage in the San Gabriel Valley.

In 2021, McGregor studied natural sciences at Pasadena City College. He attended San Jose State University, where he studied meteorology with an emphasis on climatology. During his undergraduate studies, he interned at NASA's Jet Propulsion Laboratory.

== Career and activism ==
As a teenager, McGregor joined school strikes advocating for climate action, inspired by Swedish environmental activist Greta Thunberg. In May 2019, he began a cleanup project at Eaton Canyon, a park near his home, which he initially expected to complete in 10 to 20 days. The project ultimately lasted 589 consecutive days, during which he worked daily in diverse weather conditions to remove trash from the park.

McGregor documented his efforts on social media, particularly Twitter, encouraging others to undertake similar initiatives. By 2022, he had spent nearly 1,000 days cleaning Eaton Canyon, removing over 15,000 pounds of trash, and donating proceeds from recycling to various environmental causes.

In 2023, McGregor launched the Altadena Weather and Climate Facebook page, providing localized weather forecasts for his community. During the Eaton Fire in January 2025, his real-time evacuation warnings were credited with helping residents prepare and avoid harm. As of 2025, McGregor also works for the Los Angeles County Department of Parks and Recreation as a recreation services leader.

== Personal life ==
As of 2025, McGregor lives in his childhood home in Altadena.
