= Gen. Charles S. Farnsworth County Park =

- U.S. National Register of Historic Places
- U.S. Historic district
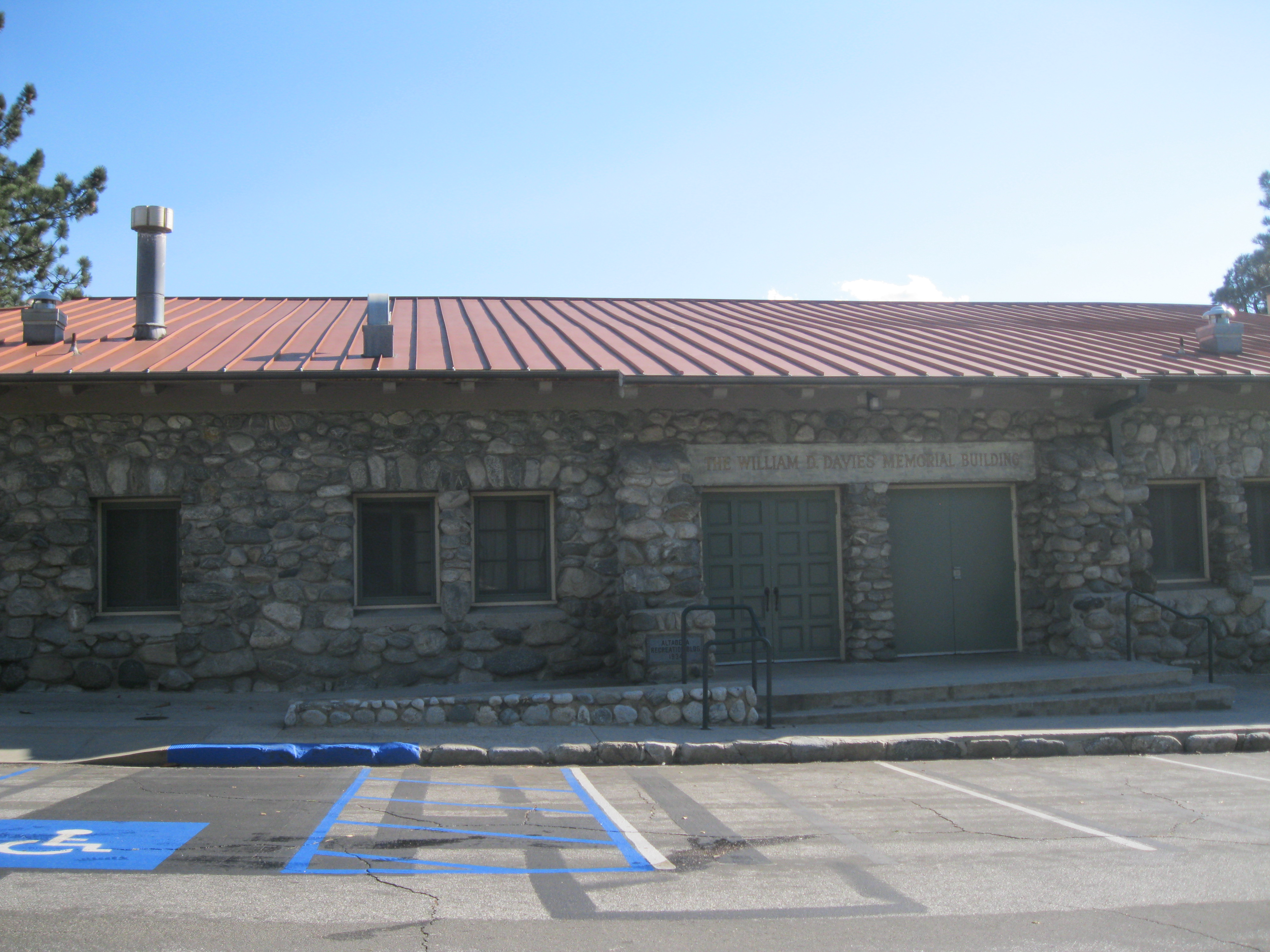
- The William D. Davies Memorial Building

- Location within the Los Angeles metropolitan area Location within California Location within the United States
- Location: 568 E. Mount Curve Ave; Altadena, California
- Coordinates: 34°12′02″N 118°07′52″W
- Architect: Charles H. Kyson
- NRHP reference No.: 97000027
- Added to NRHP: February 7, 1997

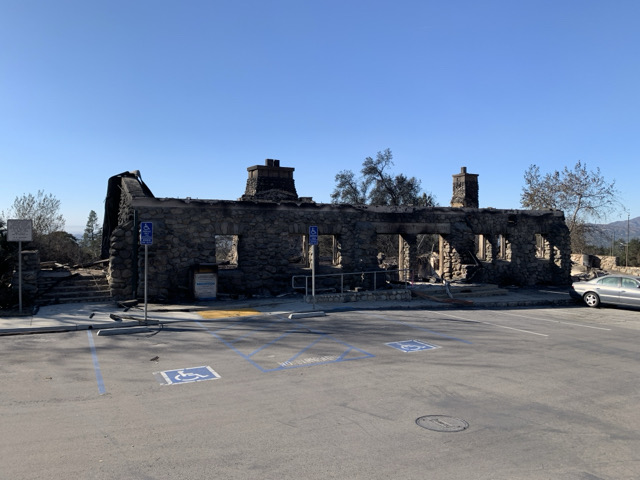
The William D. Davies Memorial Building shortly after the Eaton Fire

Gen. Charles S. Farnsworth County Park, also known as Farnsworth Park, is a Los Angeles County park and National Register of Historic Places district (site #97000027) in Altadena, California.

The land was purchased by Los Angeles County in 1921 for use as a nursery. When the County built new nurseries in the 1930s, a movement to turn the land into a county park was spearheaded by General Charles S. Farnsworth and William O. Davies. Farnsworth designed the park and supervised its grading and landscaping. Davies began planning for a community center. Funds for the construction of the community center came from grants from the Public Works Administration. The park was completed in 1934. The park was originally named Altadena Park.

The park project included a two-story arts and crafts American craftsman style building that was later christened the William D. Davies Memorial Building. The park was renamed in honor of Farnsworth in 1939. It hosted various amenities such as an amphitheater, baseball fields, tennis courts, and playgrounds.

It was placed on the Register in 1997 for its significance as a recreation and architecture site. The buildings were destroyed during the 2025 Eaton Fire.
