= The Bunny Museum =

Specialty museum in Altadena, California

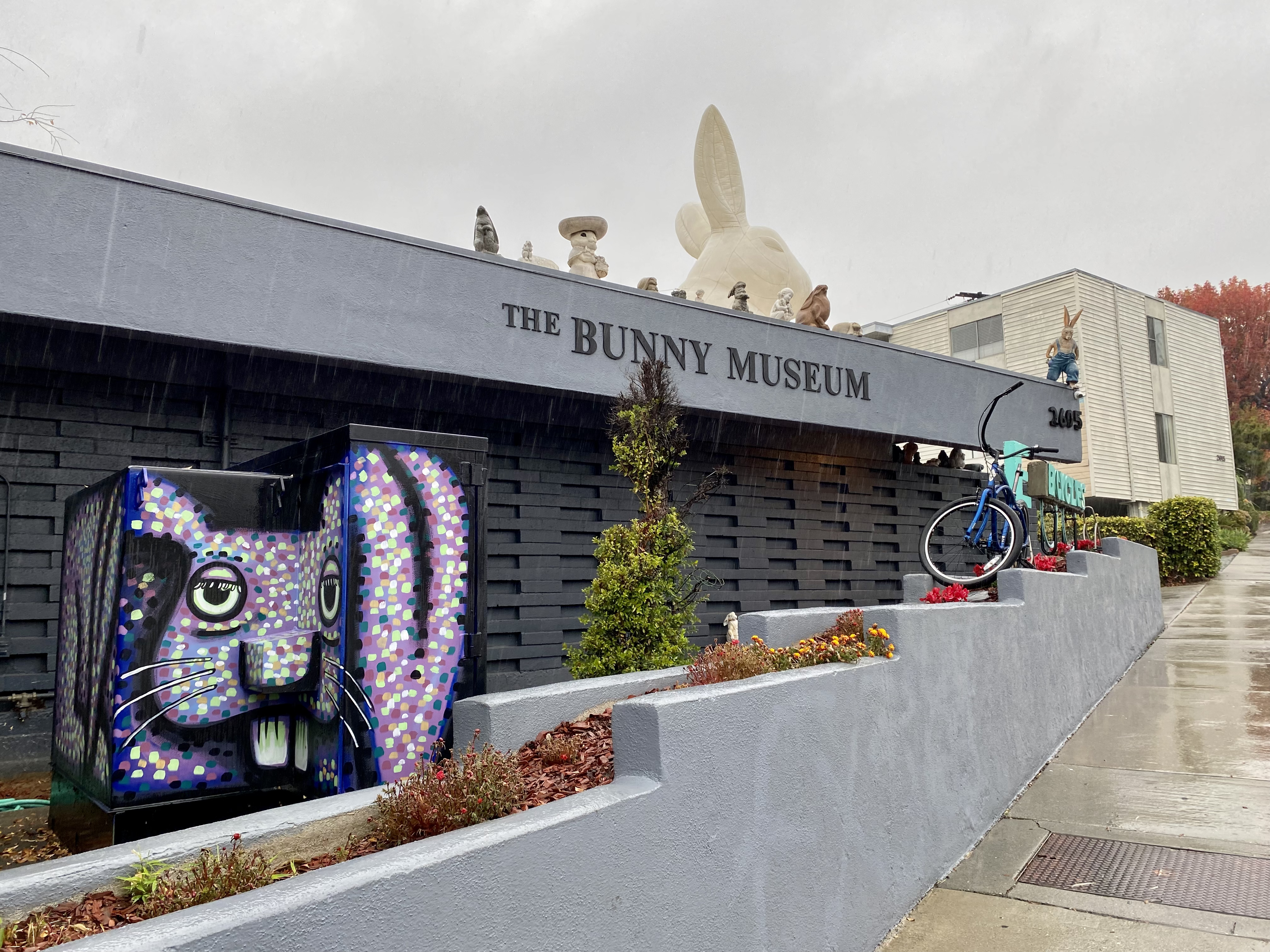
- The museum in 2021
- Established: 1998
- Location: 2605 Lake Avenue, Altadena, CA 91001
- Coordinates: 34.17036°N 118.110615°W
- Website: www.thebunnymuseum.com

The Bunny Museum was a museum dedicated to rabbits that first opened to the public in 1998, in Pasadena, California.

Prior to 2025, the museum held more than 40,550 rabbit-related items across 16 galleries in a 7,000 square foot space. The museum held the world record for the "Largest Collection of Rabbit Related Items" since 1999 when it was initially acknowledged by Guinness World Records. At that point in time, it housed 8,473 pieces of rabbit memorabilia. The slogan of the museum was "The Hoppiest Place in the World." The building was destroyed by the Eaton Fire in early 2025, but the museum plans to reopen.

== History ==
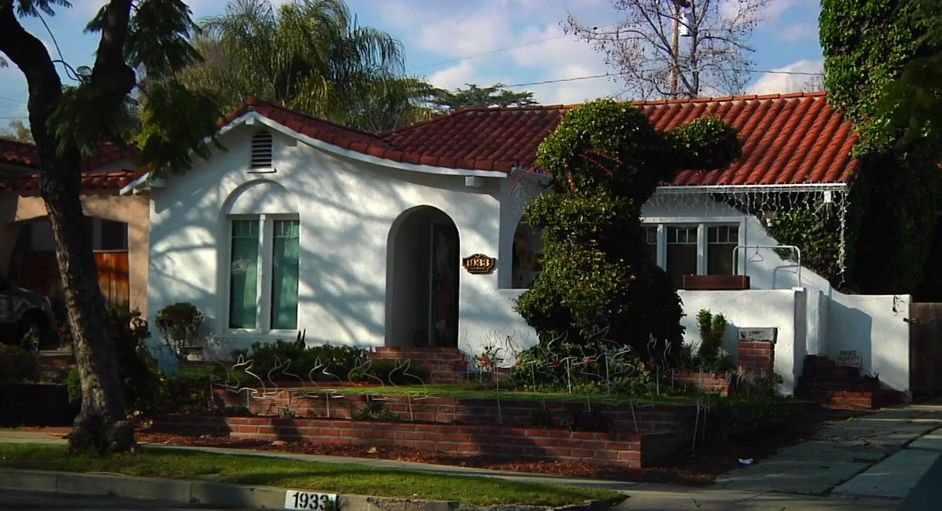
The original location of the museum in Pasadena.

The museum was co-founded by married couple Candace Frazee and Steve Lubanski, who started collecting the items after they began a tradition of giving each other new rabbit-themed gifts every day. Originally housed in the couple's home in Pasadena, the museum relocated to larger premises in Altadena in 2017.

In 2018, the Los Angeles Times wrote of the museum: "The rabbit array may seem to tilt to kitsch, but the vast stockpile harbors insight and imparts a quirky sort of gravitas."

=== Collection ===
The collection included, over 40,550 rabbit-related items including, ceramic rabbits, rabbit antiquities, stuffed rabbits, cookie-jar rabbits, 9 Rose Parade float rabbits, freeze-dried rabbits, three live rabbits, and more. Additionally, the collection included antiquities such as a Roman brooch and a rabbit-themed Egyptian amulet.

=== 2025 Eaton fire ===
The museum's building, original collection, and exhibits were destroyed by the Eaton Fire in 2025, though its live animals were safely evacuated. On the following day, Frazee and Lubanski announced their intention to rebuild the museum. On January 10, 2025 a GoFundMe campaign was created to go towards rebuilding the museum at the previous site, raising over $56,000 as of February 2, 2025.

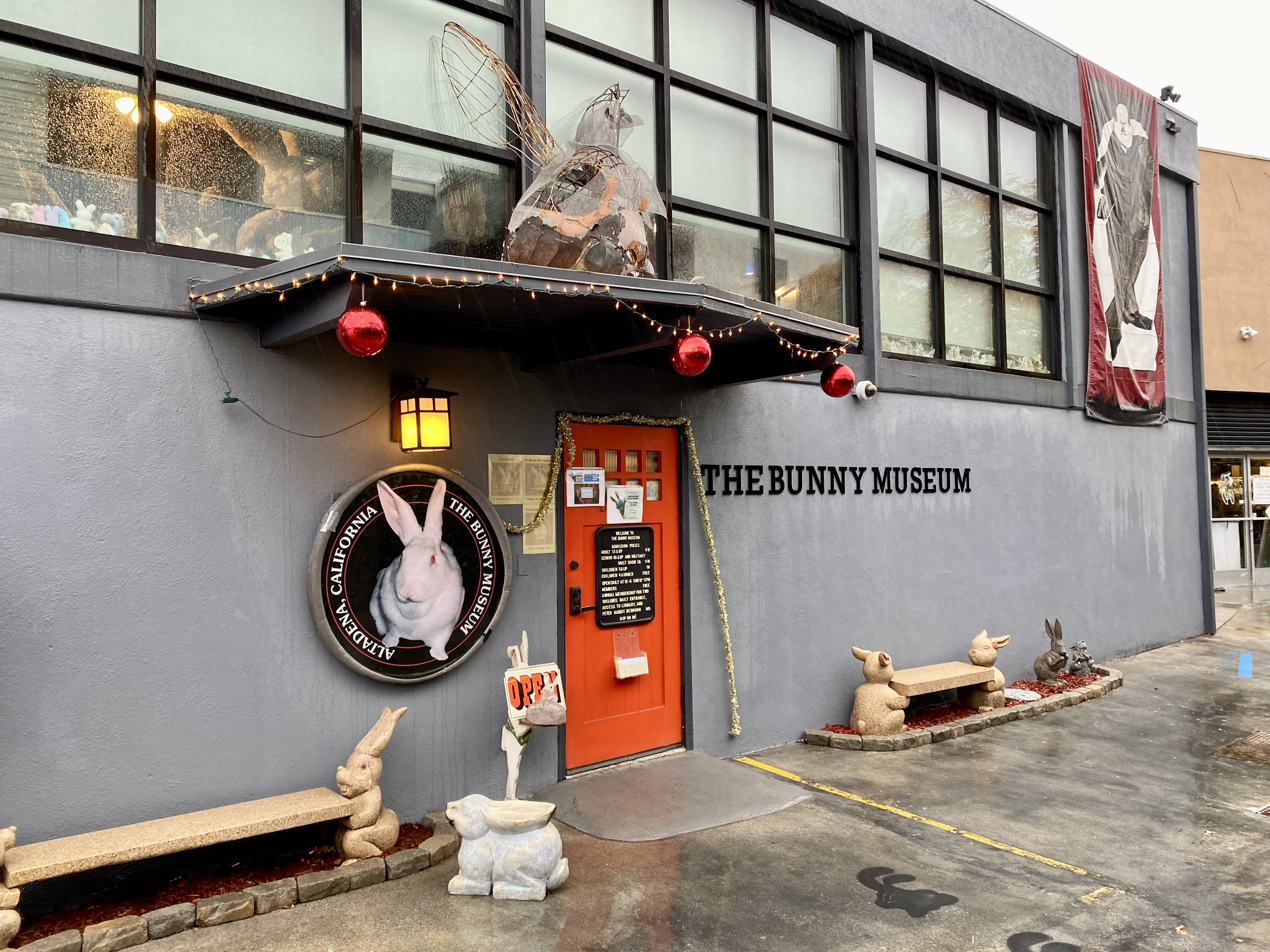

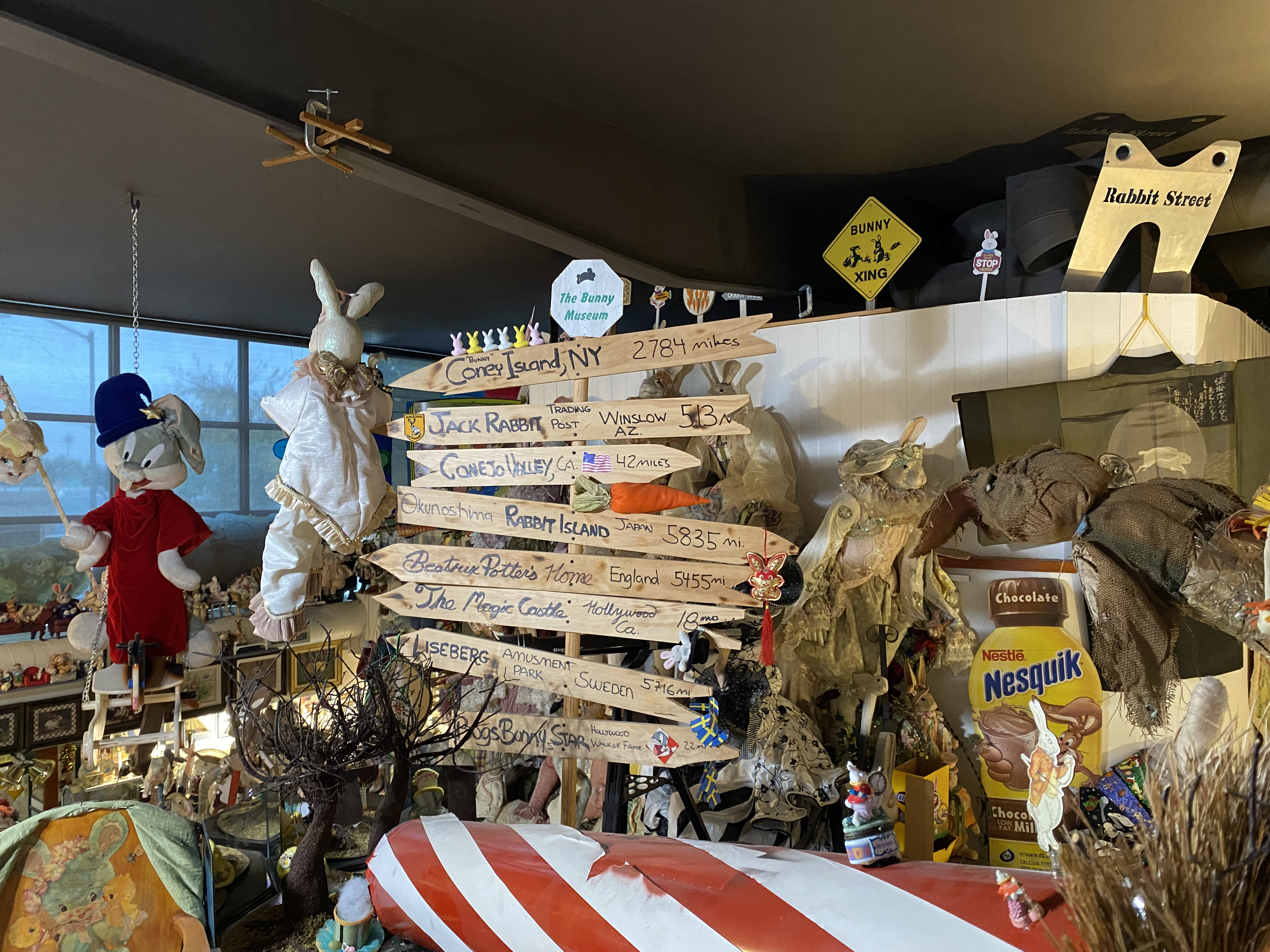

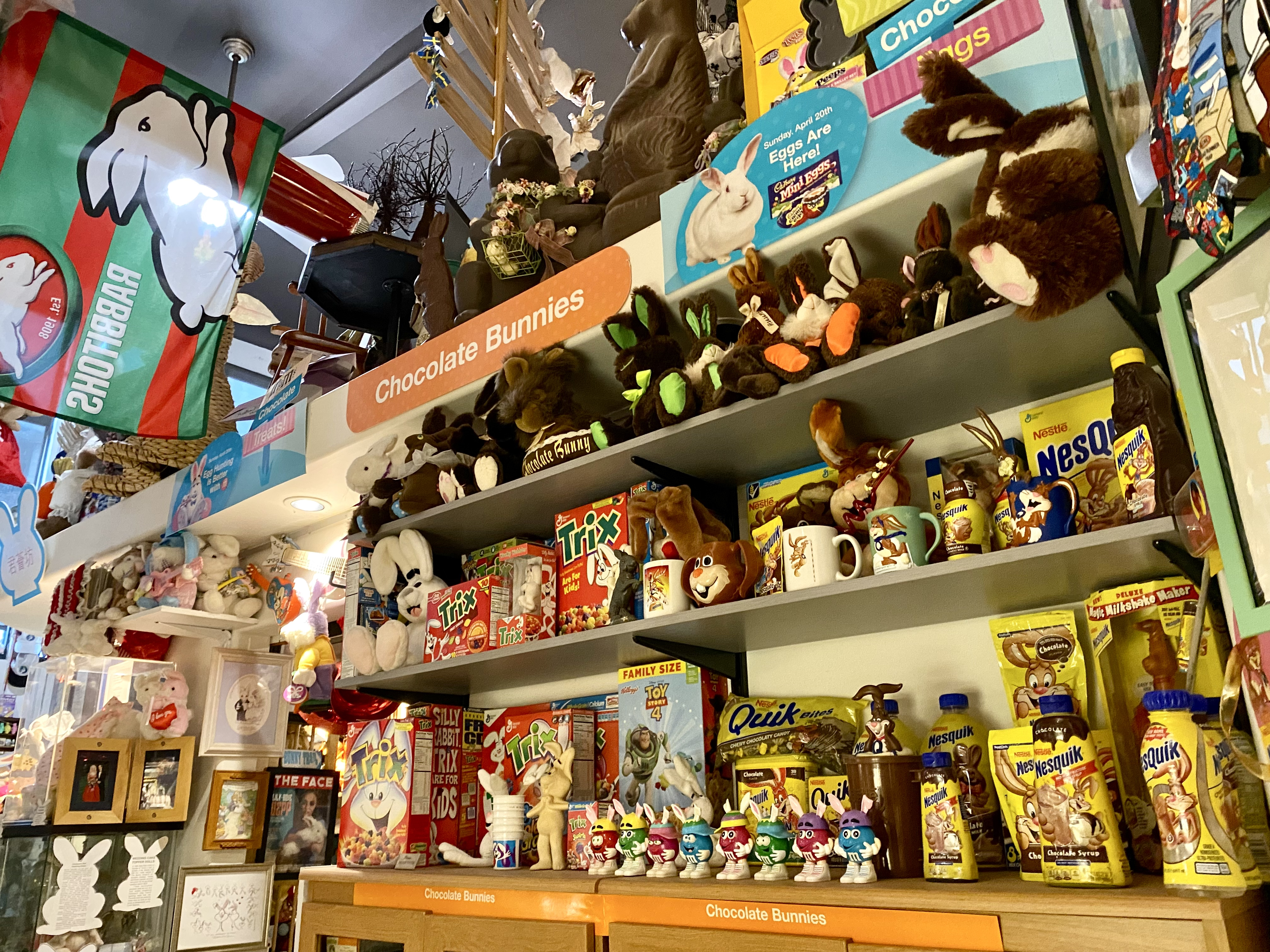

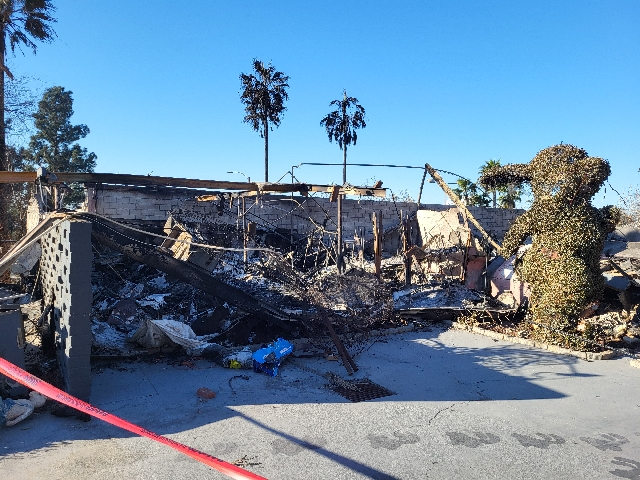
The museum shortly after the Eaton Fire

== See also ==
- House Rabbit Society
