= Meisei Electric =

Meisei Electric Co., Ltd.
- Native name: 明星電気株式会社
- Romanized name: Meisei Denki Kabushiki Kaisha
- Traded as: TYO: 6709
- Industry: Electronics
- Founded: 20 February 1938
- Headquarters: Isesaki, Japan
- Key people: Kiyoshi Ishii (CEO); Mitsuhiko Terashima (Managing board director)
- Revenue: ▼US$59.9 million (2015)
- Operating income: ▲US$2.1 million (2015)
- Net income: ▲US$1.7 million (2015)
- Total assets: ▲US$85.8 million (2015)
- Number of employees: 351 (2015)
- Subsidiaries: Meisei Management Service Co., Ltd.
- Website: www.meisei.co.jp

Meisei Electric Co., Ltd. (明星電気株式会社, Meisei Denki Kabushiki Kaisha) is a Japanese limited company which manufactures electronics and communications equipment. Founded as a radio and electrical firm in 1938, it now specialises in geological and meteorological sensors, though it has also been involved in developing avionics and spaceflight technology. It is headquartered in the city of Isesaki in Gunma Prefecture, and operates a maintenance and personnel management subsidiary in the same area. In 2012, Meisei Electric was listed among "Asia's 200 Best Companies Under a Billion" by Forbes.

== Products and operations ==
Meisei designs and manufactures a wide range of electronics, including meteorological observation systems, road visibility meters, earthquake warning networks, landslide prediction sensors, satellite-mounted monitoring cameras and aviation control systems. It also operates a maintenance and personnel management subsidiary, Meisei Management Service Co. As of 2015, the company employs over 350 people.

In 2012, Meisei Electric reported a net income of US$18 million, on revenue of $110 million. However, in 2014 the company reported a net loss of over $900,000 amid a significant fall in revenue. Meisei Electric returned to overall profitability in 2015, despite a further fall in revenue.

=== We-Wish CubeSat ===
In 2012, Meisei Electric designed and built its first satellite, the We-Wish CubeSat. We-Wish, a miniature infrared monitoring satellite built using the standardised CubeSat architecture, was developed with the assistance of amateur radio operators, and its data was made available to Japanese high school students. It was carried to orbit along with several other CubeSats aboard Japan's Kounotori 3 spacecraft in July 2012, and was launched from the International Space Station on 4 October 2012. The CubeSat destructively deorbited as intended on 11 March 2013, after over 150 days of successful operation.
