= F-1 (satellite) =

Vietnamese satellite

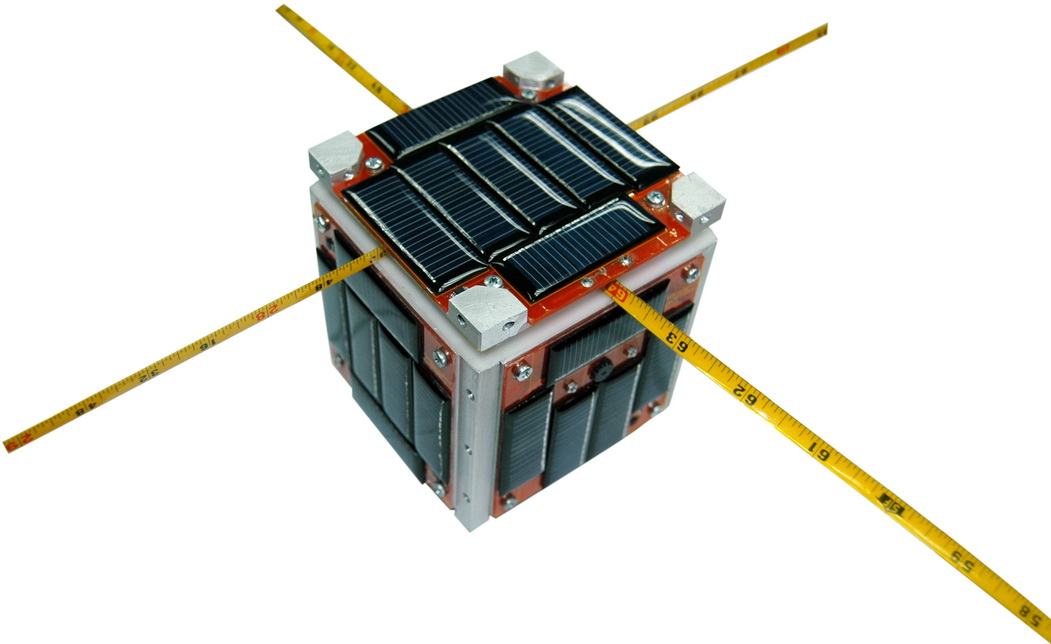
- Flight model of F-1
- Mission type: Technology demonstration
- Operator: FPT University/Uppsala University
- COSPAR ID: 2012-038E (1998-067CR)
- SATCAT no.: 38855
- Mission duration: Failed to contact ground stations 100 days (planned)

Spacecraft properties
- Spacecraft type: CubeSat
- Manufacturer: FPT University
- Launch mass: 1 kg (2.2 lb)
- Dimensions: 10 × 10 × 10 cm (3.9 × 3.9 × 3.9 in) (1U)

Start of mission
- Launch date: 21 July 2012, 02:06:18 UTC
- Rocket: H-IIB F3
- Launch site: Tanegashima, Yoshinobu LC-Y2
- Contractor: Mitsubishi Heavy Industries
- Deployed from: ISS Kibō; Delivered by Kounotori 3
- Deployment date: 4 October 2012, 15:44:15.297 UTC
- Entered service: Failed to contact ground stations

End of mission
- Decay date: 9 May 2013

Orbital parameters
- Reference system: Geocentric orbit
- Regime: Low Earth orbit
- Inclination: 51.65°
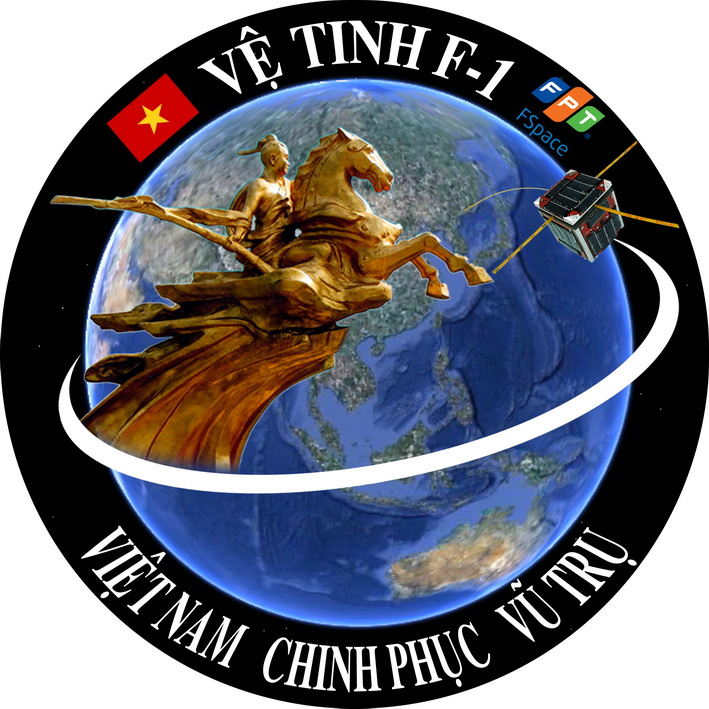
- F-1 mission patch

F-1, formally known in Vietnam as Vệ tinh nano F-1 (lit. 'Nano satellite F-1'), was a Vietnamese CubeSat built by FSpace laboratory, FPT University in partnership with Angstrom Space Technology Center (ASTC), Uppsala University, Sweden and Nanoracks, an American company.

== The satellite ==
=== Hardware ===
- Structure: aluminium alloy T-6061
- Power supply: body-mounted solar cells, rechargeable Li-Polymer battery
- PIC16 and PIC18 micro-controllers
- Yaesu VX-3R handheld transceivers
- C328 low-resolution camera
- Temperature sensors
- Three-axis magnetometer (ASTC)
- 2-meter band and 70-cm band dipole antennas

=== Specifications ===
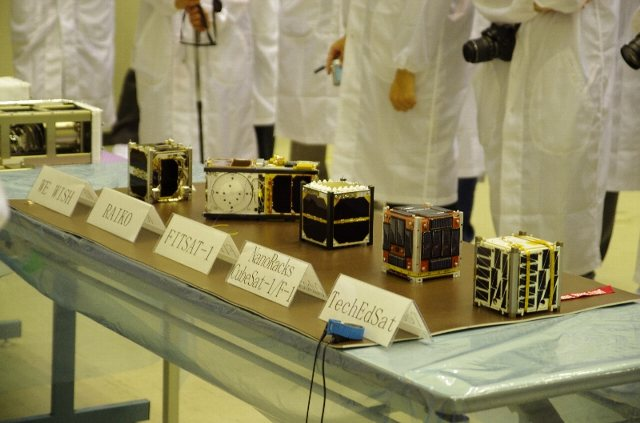
F-1 and companion CubeSats at Tsukuba Space Center, June 2012

- Size: 10 × 10 × 10 cm (3.9 × 3.9 × 3.9 in) (1U CubeSat)
- Mass: 1 kg (2.2 lb)
- Communication: 2 independent radios using amateur radio Very high frequency (VHF) and Ultra high frequency (UHF) bands, transmission speed 1200 bit/s; AFSK and PWM Morse code modulation, KISS protocol
- Payload: low resolution C328 camera (640 × 480 maximum resolution, 8 bit color)
- Sensors: temperature sensors and three-axis magnetometer
- Targeted orbit lifetime: at least 3 months on orbit (depend on release altitude from the ISS)

=== Communication subsystem and packet format ===
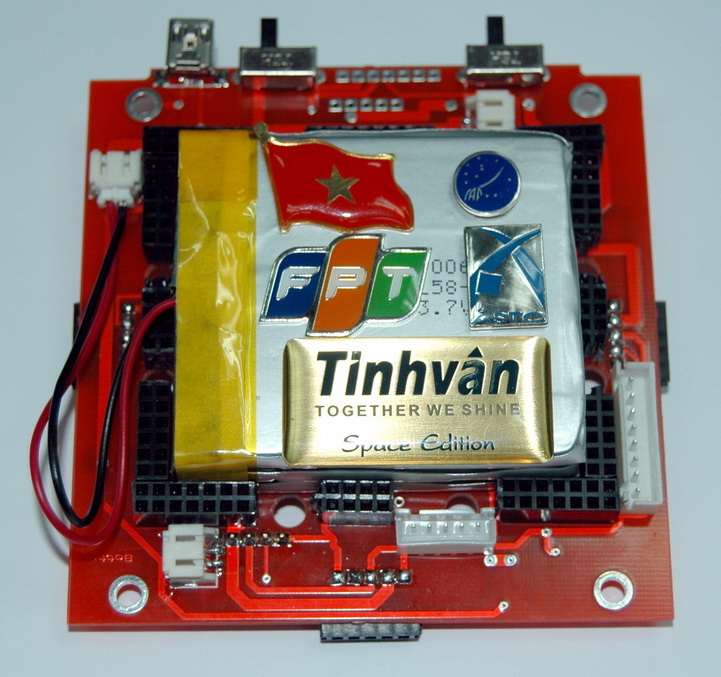
Memorial pins on F-1 resize

==== Backup UHF channel ====
- Only operational in daylight
- Frequency: 437.485 MHz
- Modulation: Narrow FM
- Power: about 0.2 watt RF output
- Antenna: half-wave dipole
- Beacon interval: 20 seconds duration, repeated every 90 seconds
- Pulse-Width-Modulation Morse code telemetry beacon, as follows:

No1	Data	Description	Size (bits)	Size (chars)
1	F-1's callsign	"XV1VN"		5
2	OBC1 reset count	Number of OBC1's reset since the beginning	8	
3	Temperature 1	°C (temperature inside F-1, OBC board)	8	5
4	Temperature 2	°C (temperature outside F-1, Y- side)	8	
5	Checksum bit	0 if summary of items #2 to #4 is even, 1 if it is odd	1	
			Total	10

==== Main VHF channel ====
- Operational during night time but may be turned on in daylight later
- Frequency: 145.980 MHz
- Modulation scheme: AFSK/FM
- Power: 1.0 watt RF output
- Antenna: half-wave dipole
- Baud rate: 1200 bit/s
- Telemetry and interval: one burst of 3 telemetry packets in KISS format every 30 seconds (interval configurable)

F-1's KISS packet format was as follows:

No	Data	Description	Size (bit)
1	Date time	Date: dd/mm/y: 5/4/3=12 bits Time: hh/mm/ss: 5/6/6=17 bits	29
2	Battery voltage	Battery voltage multiplied by 100 (divide by 100 to get actual value)	11
3	Solar cells voltage	Solar cells voltage multiplied by 10 (divide by 10 to get actual value)	8
4	Temperature 1	°C (side 1, Y+)	8
5	Temperature 2	°C (side 2, Y-)	8
6	Temperature 3	°C (side 3, X-)	8
7	Temperature 4	°C (side 4, Z+)	8
8	Temperature 5	°C (side 5, Z-)	8
9	Temperature 6	°C (side 6, X+)	8
10	Temperature 7	°C (inside side 5, Z-)	8
11	Temperature 8	°C (inside, under VX-3R1)	8
		Total	112 bits = 14 bytes

Note:

- Periodically, F-1 would send a burst of 3 telemetry packets with the same content, to avoid packet loss
- Time in UTC, 24 hours format
- Year count starting from 2012 (2012 equals 0, 2013 equals 1 and so on...)
- Battery voltage reading is accurate to 0.01 volt, values are multiplied by 100. Divide by 100 to get actual value.
- Solar cells voltage reading is accurate to 0.10 volt, values are multiplied by 10. Divide by 10 to get actual value.
- Temperature readings from sensors, will be added with 100 before transmission to ensure a positive number so please subtract 100 to get actual value
- 112 bits, divided into 14 bytes

=== Manufacturing process ===
In late 2008, plans for a small satellite were submitted to FPT Software. In early 2009, FSpace laboratory was founded.

F-1 was initially planned to have a dimension of 10 × 10 × 30 cm (3.9 × 3.9 × 11.8 in) and a mass of 3 kg (6.6 lb). Later, the satellite's dimension and mass were revised to be 10 × 10 × 10 cm (3.9 × 3.9 × 3.9 in) and 1 kg (2.2 lb) respectively.

=== Mission ===
F-1 was planned to train young engineers and students about aerospace engineering and evaluate an advanced three-axis magnetometer, Spin-Dependent Tunneling Magnetometer (SDTM) designed in Sweden by ASTC.

== Launch and status ==
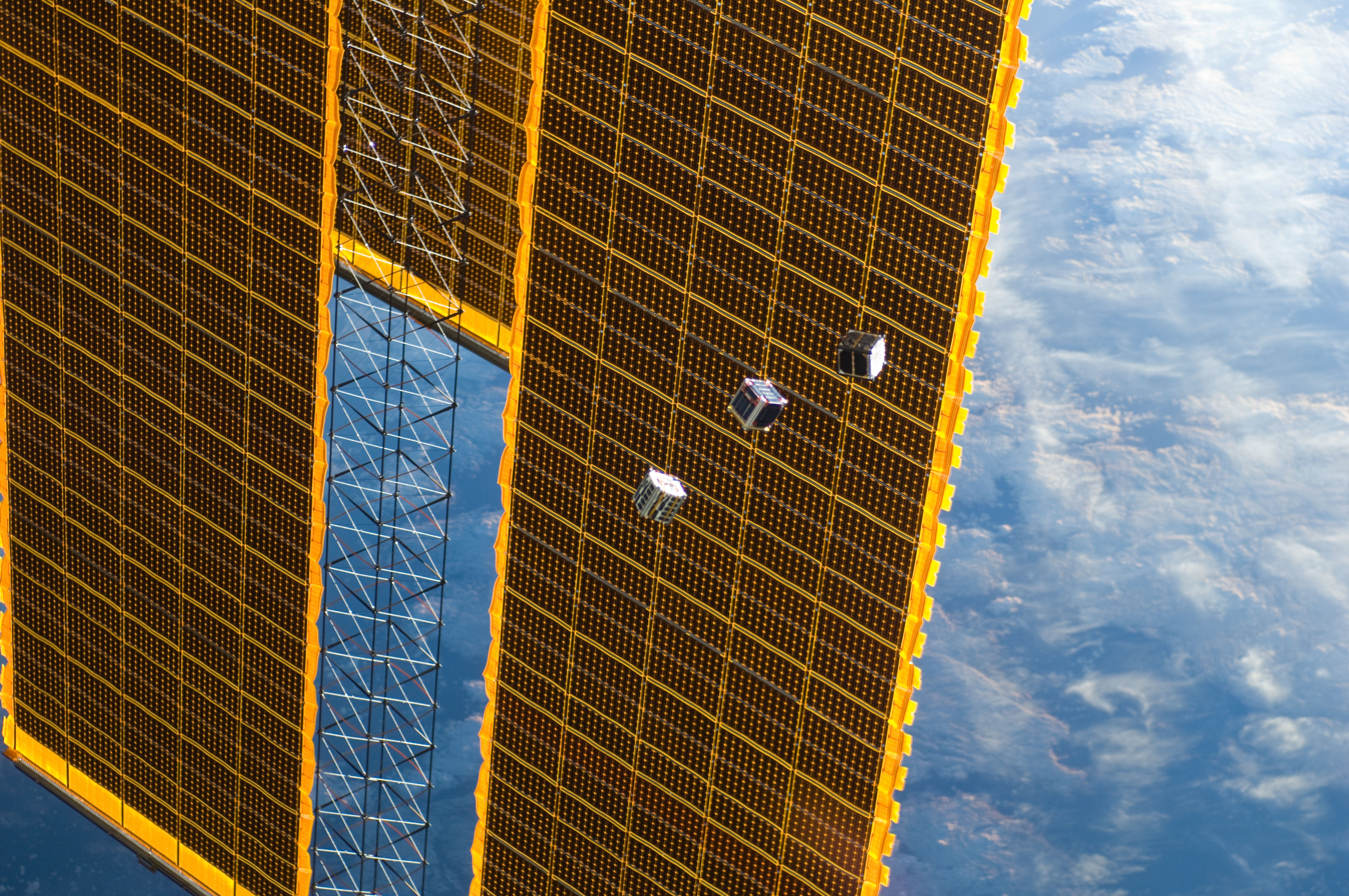
CubeSats deployed to orbit from the International Space Station on 4 October 2012 (from left: TechEdSat-1, F-1 and Niwaka).

Initially, F-1 was planned to be launched in late 2010.

F-1 was launched on 21 July 2012 and delivered to the International Space Station (ISS) aboard Kounotori 3 (HTV-3) along with the RAIKO, WE WISH, Niwaka and TechEdSat-1 cubesats. Then, on 4 October 2012, it was deployed into orbit from the ISS using the JEM-Small Satellite Orbital Deployer (J-SSOD) which was attached to the Kibō module's robotic arm.

As of 2 November 2012, F-1 failed to confirm communication after the orbital deployment.

F-1 decayed on 9 May 2013.

== F-2 satellite project ==
FSpace laboratory had planned a follow-up mission of F-1, called F-2. The F-2 satellite was expected to participate in the QB50 project, with a planned dimension and mass of 10 × 10 × 20 cm (3.9 × 3.9 × 7.9 in) and 2 kg (4.4 lb) respectively. However, F-2 was no longer listed in the QB50's website. It is unknown whether what happened with F-2, however, the project was possibly cancelled.
