= RAIKO (satellite) =

Japanese satellite

- Mission type: Technology demonstration
- Operator: Tohoku University; Wakayama University
- COSPAR ID: 2012-038B (1998-067CN)
- SATCAT no.: 38852
- Mission duration: 284 days (achieved); 100 days (planned)

Spacecraft properties
- Spacecraft type: CubeSat
- Manufacturer: Tohoku University; Wakayama University
- Launch mass: 2 kg (4.4 lb)
- Dimensions: 10 cm x 10 cm x 20 cm (2U)

Start of mission
- Launch date: 21 July 2012, 02:06:18 UTC
- Rocket: H-IIB F3
- Launch site: Tanegashima, Yoshinobu LC-Y2
- Contractor: Mitsubishi Heavy Industries
- Deployed from: ISS Kibō; Delivered by Kounotori 3
- Deployment date: 4 October 2012, 15:44:15.297 UTC

End of mission
- Last contact: 15 July 2013
- Decay date: 6 August 2013

Orbital parameters
- Reference system: Geocentric orbit
- Regime: Low Earth orbit
- Inclination: 51.65°

RAIKO (Japanese: 雷鼓, literally thunder drum) is a Japanese satellite which was built and operated by Tohoku and Wakayama Universities. A two-unit CubeSat, RAIKO was deployed from the International Space Station (ISS) on 4 October 2012, having been launched on 21 July 2012.

RAIKO was launched aboard the Kounotori 3 (HTV-3) spacecraft, atop an H-IIB launch vehicle flying from pad LC-Y2 of the Yoshinobu Launch Complex at the Tanegashima Space Center. The launch occurred at 02:06:18 UTC on 21 July 2012. Four other CubeSats were launched with RAIKO; WE WISH, FITSAT-1, TechEdSat-1 and F-1. The five CubeSats was delivered to the International Space Station for deployment. CubeSats were deployed from Japanese Experiment Module (JEM) Kibō via the J-SSOD system on 4 October 2012.

Named after a Japanese god of thunder, RAIKO is a 2 kg (4.4 lb) spacecraft, which was used for technology demonstration. It carries a camera with a fish-eye lens for Earth imaging, a prototype star tracker, a deployable membrane to slow the satellite, lowering its orbit, a photographic system to measure the satellite's movement relative to the International Space Station, and a Ku-band antenna for communications and Doppler ranging experiments.

WE WISH, RAIKO, FITSat 1, F-1, and TechEdSat-1 travelled to orbit aboard Kounotori 3 (HTV-3). RAIKO also demonstrated a deployable membrane designed to increase atmospheric drag and shorten its orbital lifetime. The mission tested Doppler-based orbit determination, high-speed Ku-band communications and the use of a small satellite as a mobile ground station for international communication experiments.
