= Niwaka =

Japanese CubeSat satellite

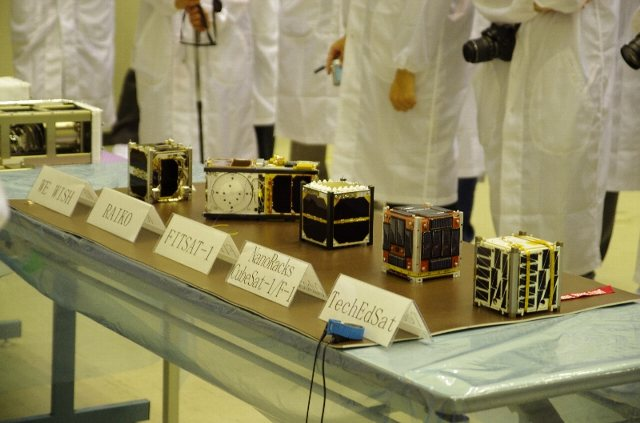
- FITSAT-1 satellite in the middle
- Names: FITSAT-1
- Mission type: Technology demonstration
- Operator: Fukuoka Institute of Technology
- COSPAR ID: 2012-038C (1998-067CP)
- SATCAT no.: 38853
- Mission duration: 273 days (achieved); 100 days (planned)

Spacecraft properties
- Spacecraft type: CubeSat
- Launch mass: 1.33 kg (2.9 lb)
- Dimensions: 10 cm x 10 cm x 10 cm (1U)

Start of mission
- Launch date: 21 July 2012, 02:06:18 UTC
- Rocket: H-IIB F3
- Launch site: Tanegashima, Yoshinobu LC-Y2
- Contractor: Mitsubishi Heavy Industries
- Deployed from: ISS Kibō; Delivered by Kounotori 3
- Deployment date: 4 October 2012, 15:44:15.297 UTC

End of mission
- Decay date: 4 July 2013

Orbital parameters
- Reference system: Geocentric orbit
- Regime: Low Earth orbit
- Perigee altitude: 413 km (257 mi)
- Apogee altitude: 418 km (260 mi)
- Inclination: 51.65°
- Period: 93.00 minutes

Niwaka or FITSAT-1 is a 1U CubeSat satellite deployed from the International Space Station (ISS) on 4 October 2012. The Niwaka satellite includes high power LEDs which are driven by 200 watts pulses, allowing Morse code style communication from the sky to the ground. FITSAT-1 (Niwaka) communicates with ground by means of 5.8 GHz high-speed (115200 bit/s) transmitter. It also has a 437 MHz (amateur band) beacon and transmitter with data rate 1200 bit/s for telemetry downlink.

The name Niwaka derives from "Hakata Niwaka", which is traditional impromptu comical talking with masks. It is also the old name of the city Fukuoka, site of the Fukuoka Institute of Technology in Japan which created the satellite.

WE WISH, RAIKO, FITSAT-1, F-1, and TechEdSat-1 travelled to orbit aboard Kounotori 3 (HTV-3).

It reentered in the atmosphere of Earth on 4 July 2013.

== Launch ==
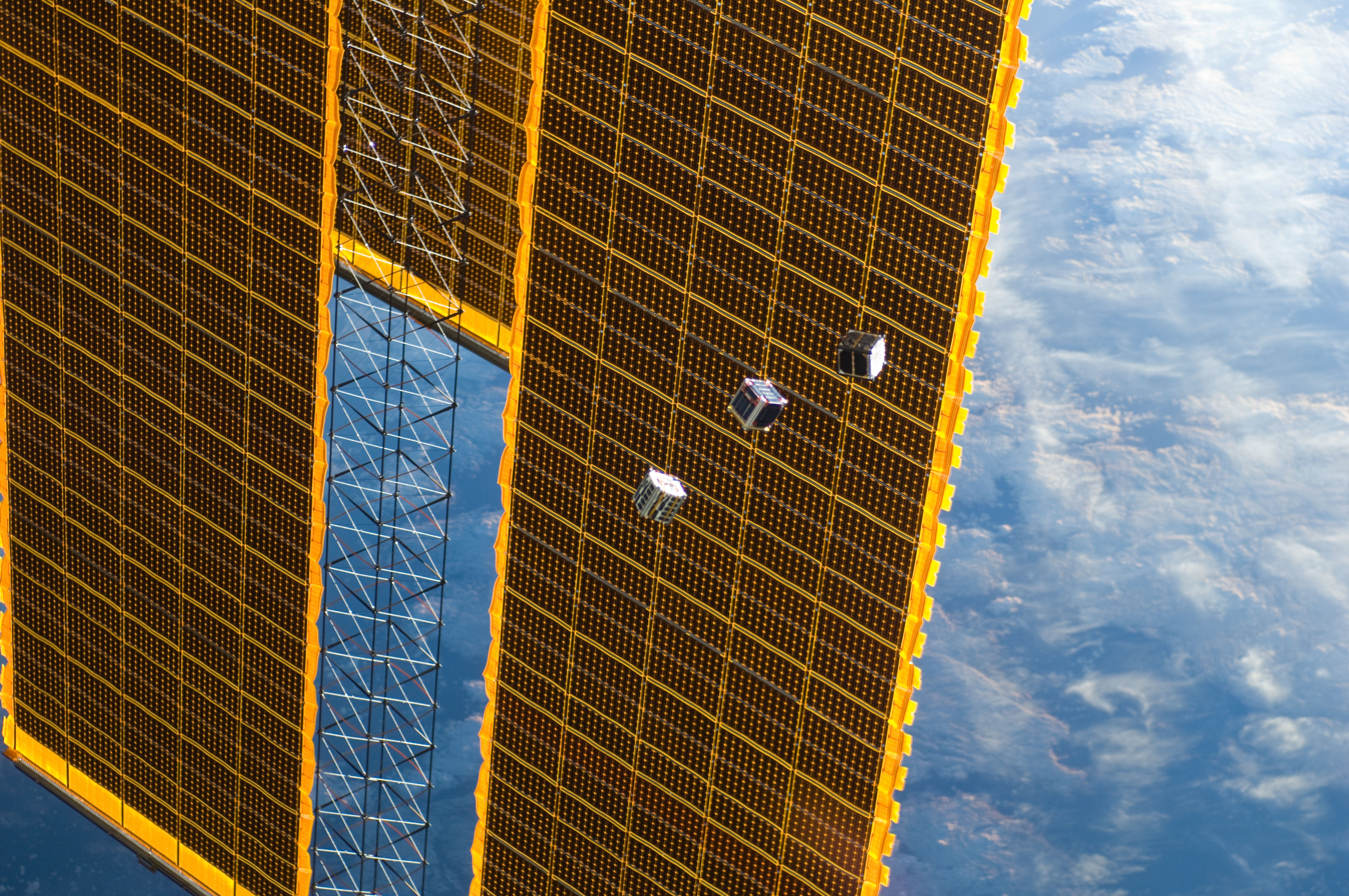
CubeSats deployed to orbit from the International Space Station on 4 October 2012 (from left: TechEdSat-1, F-1 and FITSAT-1).

== See also ==
- 2012 in spaceflight
- Ginrei - another LED satellite (2014)
