= Ginrei =

- Mission type: Technology
- Operator: Shinshu University
- COSPAR ID: 2014-009A
- SATCAT no.: 39572
- Website: Ginrei Mission Site

Spacecraft properties
- Manufacturer: Shinshu University
- Launch mass: 35 kilograms (77 lb)

Start of mission
- Launch date: 27 February 2014, 18:37 UTC
- Rocket: H-IIA 202
- Launch site: Tanegashima Yoshinobu 1
- Contractor: Mitsubishi

End of mission
- Decay date: 24 November 2014

Orbital parameters
- Reference system: Geocentric
- Regime: Low Earth
- Perigee altitude: 387 kilometres (240 mi)
- Apogee altitude: 404 kilometres (251 mi)
- Inclination: 65 degrees
- Period: 92.47 minutes
- Epoch: 28 February 2014

Ginrei or ShindaiSat was a 400x400x450mm cube-like microsatellite intended to text experimental visible light communication. The satellite is made in Shinshu University (Japan). The ground station was completed by 18 March 2014 and attempts to communicate with satellite have started the same day. 2-way optical communication with ground station is planned. Also, advanced attitude control using visible light communication is planned as well.

== Mission results ==
The Ginrei optical signals were received 10 seconds per pass, averaged over 56 passes over the control station. The narrow beam and infrequent operation of optical transmitter have resulted in severe disappointment in amateur optical tracking community.

== See also ==
- 2014 in spaceflight
- Niwaka
