= YouTube Space Lab =

International science competition

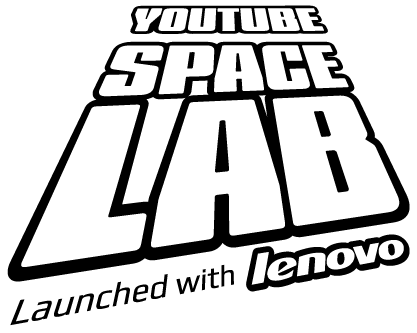
English logo

YouTube Space Lab was a 2011–2012 international science competition launched by YouTube and Lenovo, in cooperation with NASA, European Space Agency (ESA), and the Japan Aerospace Exploration Agency (JAXA). Founded by Zahaan Bharmal of Google, the competition challenged teenagers from ages 14–18 to design an experiment to be performed on the International Space Station. The global winners were Amr Mohamed from Alexandria, Egypt, and Dorothy Chen and Sara Ma from Troy, Michigan.

== Announcement and finalists ==
YouTube and Lenovo announced the YouTube Space Lab competition on 10 October 2011. Applicants were challenged to design a microgravity experiment, and submissions closed in early December. On 17 January 2012, YouTube Space Lab announced sixty finalists and started the voting process for the regional winners where over 150,000 YouTube users voted for their favorite experiments. These results were factored alongside YouTube Space Lab's panel of judges, including Stephen Hawking, William Gerstenmaier, Leland Melvin, Akihiko Hoshide, Guy Laliberté, and Tshilidzi Marwala. Stephen Hawking, however, was unable to fully participate as a judge at this stage because of health problems, and his position was filled by colleague Paul Shellard.

Regions	14- to 16-year-old finalists	17- to 18-year-old finalists
Asia Pacific	Thomas Gambuti, Francesca Mcgrath, and Ruby Wright — Australia; Wyatt McCoach and Forrest Gerner — Australia; Abhishek Shastry and Animesh Shastry — India; Nitya Raju — India; Patrick Zeng and Derek Chan — New Zealand; Ping-Chun Lin & Wei-Ting Hsiao — Taiwan	Luke Ditria and Johnny Udall — Australia; Nasir Uddin and AKM Shoaibul Islam — Bangladesh; Ali Ashraf Mohd Rozaiddin, Muhammad Irsyad Aripin, and Mohd Aizat Mohd Ezmir — Malaysia; Bhoomika Agarwal and Shruthi C — India; Mohit Singhala — India; Nesar M.N. — India; Kavin Sundar Nath — India; Megha Sharma and Karan Sapolia Sharma — India; Sachin Kukke — India; Shri Shankari — India; Anna Yang and Cindy Chen — Taiwan; Sakomizu Wei-yu and Eileen Hess — Taiwan
Europe, Middle East, and Africa	Tobias Antensteiner — Austria; Victoria Tiki — Austria; Simon Kopf — Germany; Ariel Berko and Yoav Levi — Israel; Jaime Costa Centena — Spain—Morocco; Maciej Giza — Poland; Michał Styk, Maria Leniarska, and Jakub Jabłoński — Poland; Stanisław Bartczak, Sylwia Grabińska, Mateusz Piotrowski — Poland; Rafał Wesołowski, Marcin Ruchniewicz, and Krzysztof Kallas — Poland; Laura Calvo and María Vilas — Spain; Luis Alvarez Ayuso and Marina Lopez Gonzalez — Spain; Reuben Thomas-Davis — UK; Harry Green and Jack Goodwill — UK	Amr Mohamed — Egypt; François Tirvaudey — France; Michael Judt — Germany (lives in UK); Adam Debreceni — Hungary; Peter Egri and Gábor Galgóczi — Hungary; Bartosz Krzowski — Poland; Patrik Kopcinski — Poland; João Pereira and Vasco Ferreira — Portugal; Miguel Ferreira, Guilherme Aresta, and Daniel Carvalho — Portugal; Miguel Moral Sola and Rafael Ferrer Fernandez — Spain; Nicolás Marí Hernández, Olivier van Donselaar, and Pere Balaguer Gimeno — Spain
The Americas	Katie Gwozdecky — Canada; Michael De Lazzari, Erik Friedman, and Jenny Zhang — Canada; Valentina Mazzanti and Sebastian Escobar — Colombia; Mark Liang — US (San Marino, California); Natalie Ng — US (Cupertino, California); Luis Tapia and Ben Miller — US (Castro Valley, California); Pranav Singh — US (Irvine, California); Sara Ma and Dorothy Chen — US (Troy, Michigan); Cheyenne Hua, Erica Lin, and Karina Xie — US (New York City, New York)	Habeeb Ahmed and Annas Khan — Canada; Jesse Bettencourt, Alex Kasper, and Mackenzie Richardson — Canada; José Arce Gamboa and Brandon Solórzano — Costa Rica; Claudio Nahmad — Mexico; Mariana Infante — Mexico; Brian Barr, Shawn Albert, and Aditya Ragunathan — US (Dacula/Snellville/Duluth, Georgia); Emerald Bresnahan — US (Plainville, Massachusetts); Emily O'Brien, Jillian Stoneburg, and Art Sherman — US (Barberton/Copley/ Akron, Ohio); Grady Ward, Colin Watts, and Charlie Wu — US (Essex Junction, Vermont)

== Regional and global winners ==
Regional winners were determined by votes cast by the YouTube community factored alongside the votes cast by the competition's panel of judges. On 22 February 2012, YouTube Space Lab announced the following six regional winning teams, two from each international region:

Regions	14- to 16-year-old age group		17- to 18-year-old age group	
Regions	Group	Experiment	Group	Experiment
Asia Pacific	Patrick Zeng & Derek Chan (New Zealand)	"Is space too cold for life to exist?"	Sachin S. Kukke (Bangalore, India)	"Could liquid magnets take us deeper into space?"
Europe, Middle East, and Africa	Laura Calvo & María Vilas (Spain)	"Could weightless liquids be the key to better gadgets?"	Amr Mohamed (Alexandria, Egypt)	"Can you teach an old spider new tricks?"
The Americas	Dorothy Chen & Sara Ma (Troy, Michigan, U.S.A.)	"Could alien superbugs cure disease on Earth?"	Emerald Bresnahan (Plainville, Massachusetts, U.S.A.)	"Could a snowflake unlock the mysteries of the universe?"

The nine contestants gathered on March in Washington, D.C., to experience a zero-gravity flight on the "Vomit Comet" and to tour the Steven F. Udvar-Hazy Center. They attended the competition award ceremony on 22 March at the Newseum, where Zahaan Bharmal announced the two winning experiments: Dorothy Chen and Sara Ma's bacteria experiment, and Amr Mohamed's jumping spider experiment.

BioServe Space Technologies, from the University of Colorado at Boulder, designed the two experiments using global winners' ideas. Dorothy and Sara went to the Tanegashima Space Center in Japan in late July to watch the Kounotori 3 launch the winning experiments into space. Instead of attending the launch, Amr chose to later go through cosmonaut training at the Yuri Gagarin Cosmonaut Training Center in Star City, Russia.

== Livestream and results ==
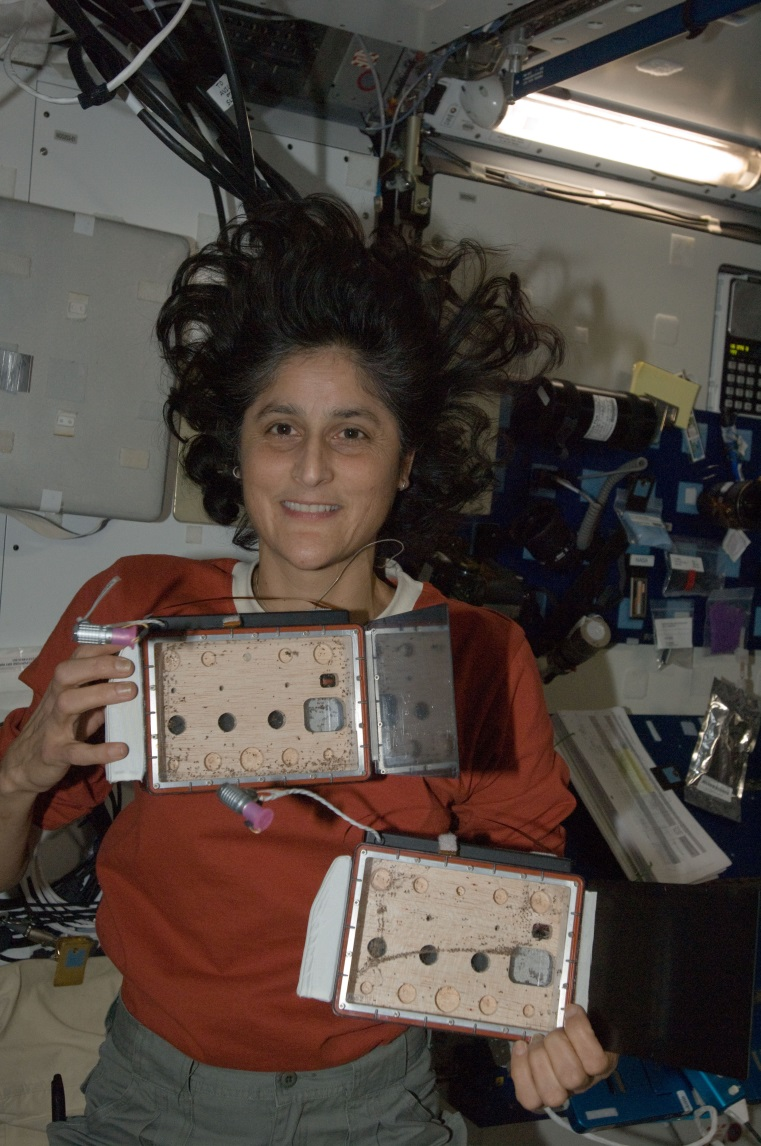
Sunita Williams in the ISS holding two spider habitats from the competition

On 13 September 2012, Bill Nye hosted a live-stream interview connecting the three global winners with astronaut Sunita Williams. Sunita, who had performed the experiments on the ISS, gave the preliminary results for these experiments. Dorothy and Sara had hypothesized that the Bacillus subtilis would become more efficient germ-fighters in microgravity, and the initial results showed signs of growth. However, the specimens would have to be taken back to Earth for further testing. Amr's experiment examined the predatory behavior of the jumping spider, and the ISS reported that Amr's spider, named Nefertiti and nicknamed Neffi, had successfully adapted to catch its prey in microgravity.

Nefertiti returned to Earth on 30 November 2012 and lived at the O. Orkin Insect Zoo in Washington, D.C., until she died four days later. Nefertiti's traveling companion, a zebra spider named Cleopatra, died soon after touchdown.
