= Small Payload Quick Return =

Small Payload Quick Return (SPQR) is a NASA Ames Research Center concept to return small payloads from orbit.

The system uses an Exo-Brake, a parachute-like drag device for use in the low-pressure exosphere of Low Earth Orbit. This is the first part of a three part return system, operating from 350 to 100 km.

== Exo-Brake ==
The first test of the Exo-Brake system from orbit began with the launching of the TechEdSat-3p nano-satellite from the International Space Station on November 19, 2013.

TechEdSat-4 is expected to test an Exo-Brake with variable drag in 2014.

TechEdSat-3p took over 60 days to deorbit, while TechEdSat-4 reentered in about 30 days.

A newer Exo-Brake system was tested on TechEdSat-5, deployed from the ISS in 2017. It is a flexible cross shape that can be warped for steering during reentry.

== SOAREX Flights ==
Several investigations related to the SPQR programs and TechEdSat have been flown on Sub-Orbital Aerodynamic Re-entry Experiments (SOAREX) sounding rockets flights.

SOAREX-6 flew 27 November 2008 on an ATK ALV X-1 sounding rocket, but the rocket veered off course and the flight was terminated by range safety. SOAREX-6 survived the launch vehicle explosion and transmitted data until it was destroyed on splashdown.

SOAREX-7 flew 28 May 2009 aboard a Terrier-Orion sounding rocket launched from Wallops Flight Facility (WFF) in Virginia. A TDRV (Tube Deployed Re-entry Vehicle) was successfully tested after the flight reached its apogee of 134 km.

On SOAREX-8, which launched on a Black Brant 9 sounding rocket, a wireless sensor module, a camera, various communication devices, and a full Exo-Brake were tested.

On SOAREX-9, a wireless sensor module, a camera, and various communication devices were tested.
