= TechEdSat =

Space technology development program

Technology Education Satellite (TechEdSat) is a successful nano-sat flight series conducted from the NASA Ames Research Center in collaboration with numerous universities (San Jose State University, University of Idaho, University of California, University of Minnesota, and Smith College). While one of the principal aims has been to introduce young professionals and university students to the practical realm of developing space flight hardware, considerable innovations have been introduced. In addition, this evolving flight platform has tested concepts for Low Earth Orbit (LEO) sample return, as well as planetary nano-sat class mission concepts.

== TechEdSat-1 ==
TechEdSat-1
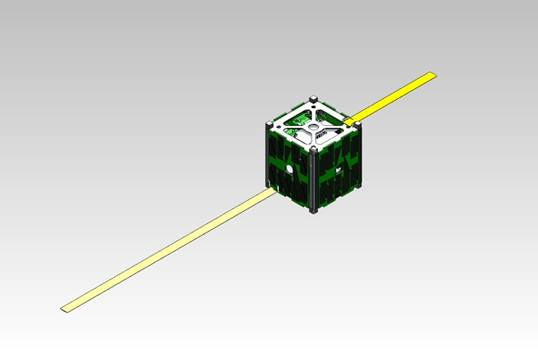
- Computer-aided design drawing of TechEdSat-1
- Names: TES-1
- Mission type: Technology demonstration
- Operator: NASA Ames Research Center · San Jose State University · University of Idaho · JAXA · ÅAC Microtec
- COSPAR ID: 2012-038D (1998-067CQ)
- SATCAT no.: 38854
- Mission duration: 213 days (achieved); 100 days (planned)

Spacecraft properties
- Spacecraft type: CubeSat
- Bus: CubeSat
- Launch mass: 1.2 kg (2.6 lb)
- Dimensions: 11.35 cm x 10.0 cm x 10.0 cm (1U)
- Power: 1.229 watts

Start of mission
- Launch date: 21 July 2012, 02:06:18 UTC
- Rocket: H-IIB F3
- Launch site: Tanegashima Space Center, Yoshinobu LC-Y2
- Contractor: Mitsubishi Heavy Industries
- Deployed from: ISS Kibō; Delivered by Kounotori 3
- Deployment date: 4 October 2012, 15:44:15.297 UTC

End of mission
- Decay date: 5 May 2013

Orbital parameters
- Reference system: Geocentric orbit
- Regime: Low Earth orbit
- Perigee altitude: 402 km (250 mi)
- Apogee altitude: 422 km (262 mi)
- Inclination: 51.66°
- Period: 92.80 minutes

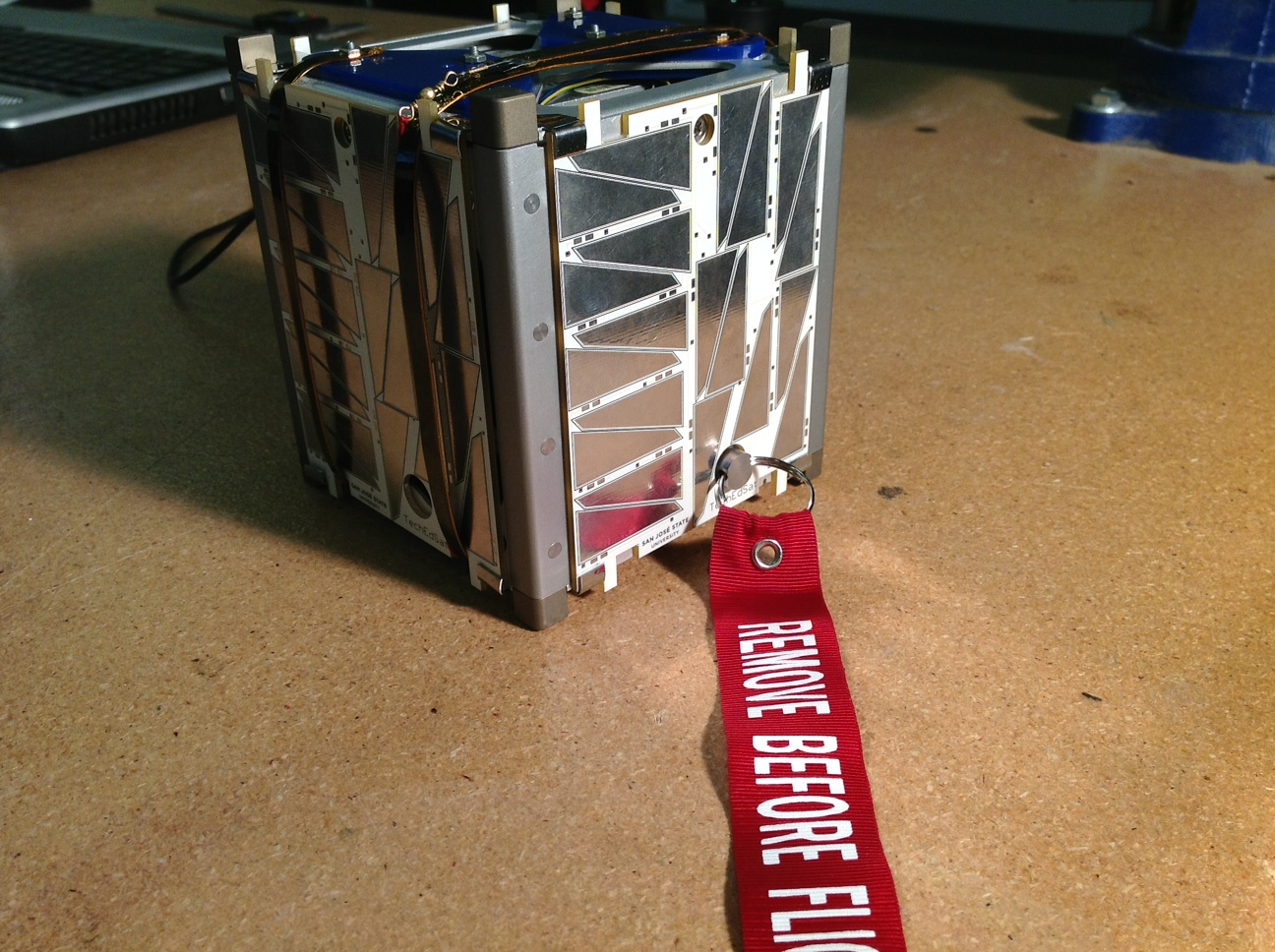
TechEdSat Engineering Development Unit

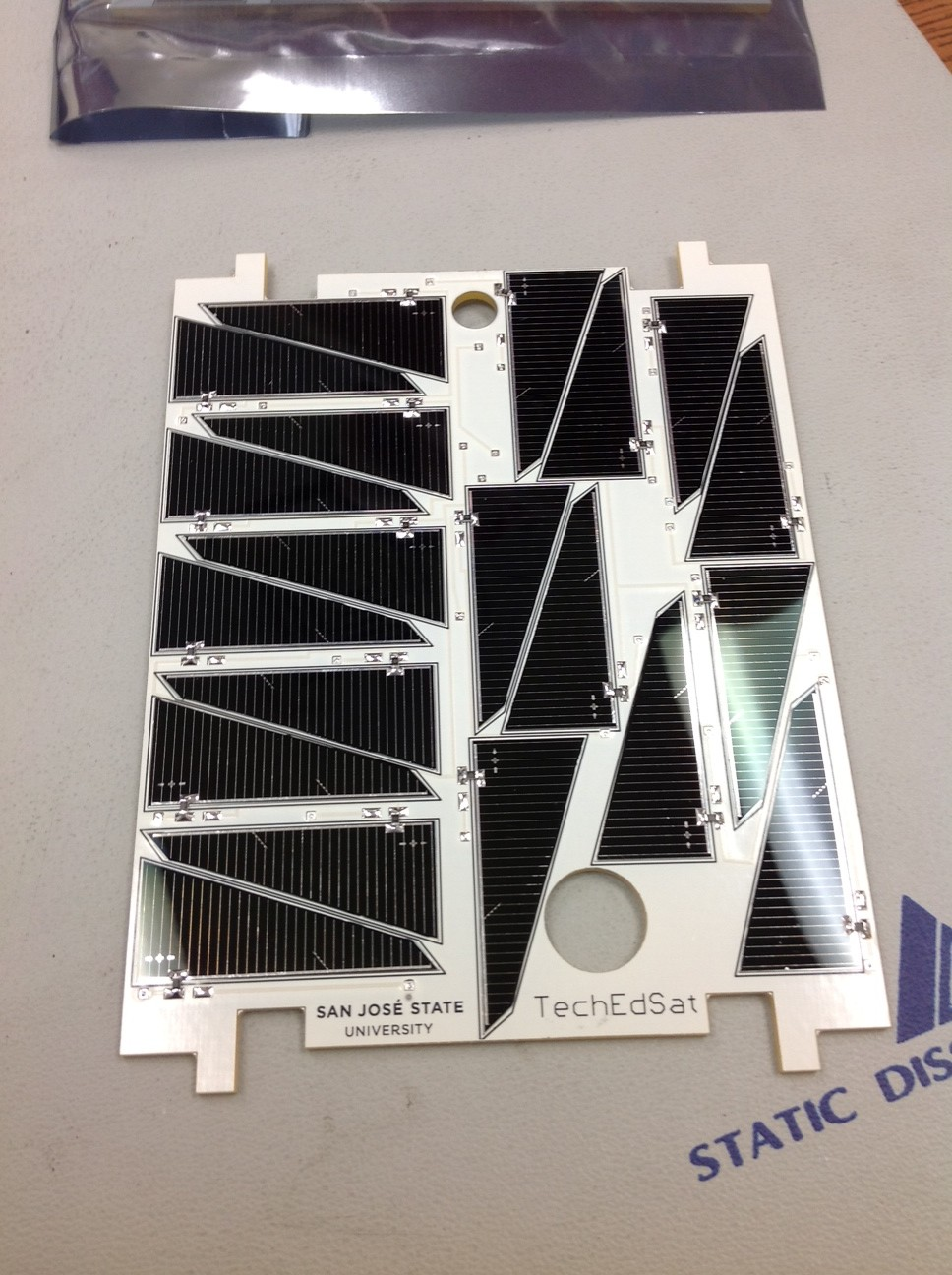
TechEdSat Solar Panel

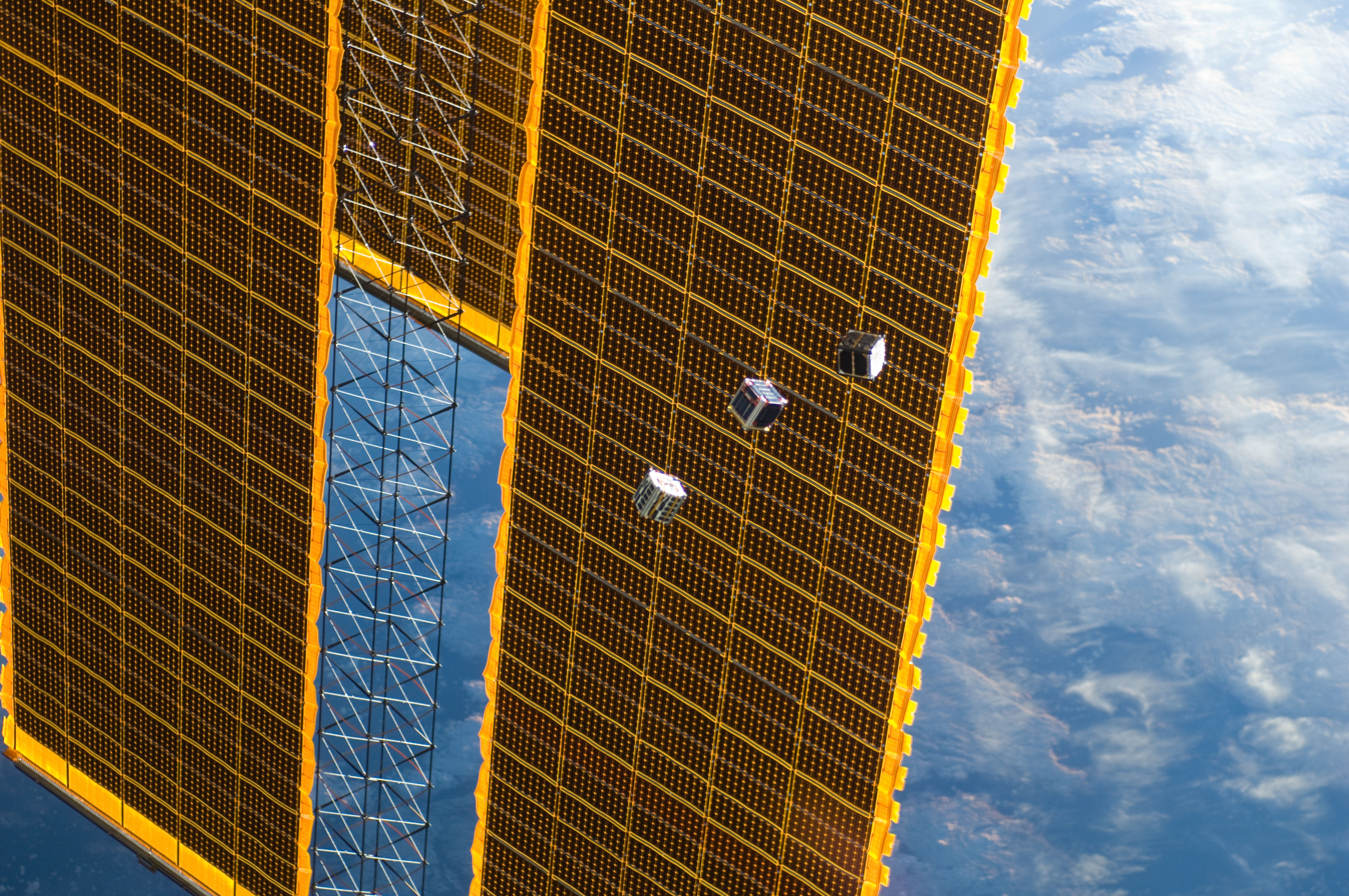
CubeSats deployed to orbit from the International Space Station (ISS) on 4 October 2012 (from left: TechEdSat-1, F-1 and FITSAT-1).

The first TechEdSat (later renamed "TechEdSat-1" or "TES-1") was a 1U-Cubesat designed to evaluate Space Plug-and-play Avionics (SPA) designed in Sweden by ÅAC Microtec. It was also originally intended to perform a communications experiment utilizing the Iridium and Orbcomm satellite phone network, although this function was disabled before launch. TechEdSat was deployed into orbit from the International Space Station (ISS) on 4 October 2012. It reentered to atmosphere on 5 May 2013.

=== Hardware ===
- Quake Global Q1000 Modem (Orbcomm) (deactivated)
- Quake Global Q9602 Modem (Iridium) (deactivated)
- Stensat Radio Beacon
- 4 x nanoRTU (ÅAC Microtec)
- Main Power Distribution Board (ÅAC Microtec)
- RTU Lite (ÅAC Microtec)
- 2 meter band Monopole Antenna
- 70 cm band Monopole Antenna
- 1600 MHz Patch Antenna
- Pumpkin, Inc. 1U Skeletonized CubeSat Structure
- Canon BP-930 Lithium-ion battery

=== Specifications ===
- Dimensions: 11.35 cm x 10.0 cm x 10.0 cm
- Mass: 1.2 kg (2.6 lb)
- Power Consumption (Safe Mode): 0.350 W
- Power Consumption (Safe Mode, Stensat Transmitting): 3.400 W
- Power Consumption (Nominal Mode): 3.965 W
- Power Consumption (Q1000 Transmitting): 27.125 W
- Power Consumption (Q9602 Transmitting): 10.490 W
- Power Consumption (Nominal Mode, Stensat Transmitting): 7.015 W
- Solar Array (Average): 1.229 W
- Power Storage: 17 Wh

=== Launch ===
TechEdSat was launched from pad 2 of the Tanegashima Space Center, Yoshinobu Launch Complex (LC-Y2) on 21 July 2012, at 02:06 UTC, aboard Kounotori 3 atop an H-IIB launch vehicle. Kounotori 3 carried the satellite, along with the RAIKO, WE WISH, Niwaka, and F-1 spacecraft, to the International Space Station (ISS), from where it was deployed via the JAXA J-SSOD deployer, from the Kibō module on 4 October 2012 at 15:44:15.297 UTC.

=== Beacon Packet Format ===
TechEdSat-1 transmitted a heartbeat packet over amateur radio every 4 seconds. These packets are 122 ASCII character AX.25 packets. Amateur band radio frequency is 437.465 MHz. Two consecutive 12 bit raw Analog-to-digital converter (ADC) data values are parsed into one 3 byte chunk in order to save data space.

== TechEdSat-2 ==
TechEdSat-2
- Names: TES-2; PhoneSat v2a PhoneSat 2.0 Beta; Alexander
- Mission type: Technology demonstration
- Operator: NASA Ames Research Center
- COSPAR ID: 2013-016C
- SATCAT no.: 39144
- Mission duration: 7 days (planned); 6 days (achieved)

Spacecraft properties
- Spacecraft type: CubeSat
- Manufacturer: NASA Ames Research Center
- Launch mass: 0.5 kg (1.1 lb)
- Dimensions: 10 cm x 10 cm x 10 cm (1U)

Start of mission
- Launch date: 21 April 2013, 21:00:02.2 UTC
- Rocket: Antares 110 A-ONE
- Launch site: Wallops Island MARS, LP-0A
- Contractor: Orbital Sciences

End of mission
- Decay date: 27 April 2013

Orbital parameters
- Reference system: Geocentric orbit
- Regime: Low Earth orbit
- Perigee altitude: 218 km (135 mi)
- Apogee altitude: 228 km (142 mi)
- Inclination: 51.64°
- Period: 88.95 minutes

An Iridium transceiver flew aboard the PhoneSat v2a CubeSat as the TechEdSat-2 mission, separate from the spacecraft originally planned as TechEdSat-2.

Alexander, also known as PhoneSat 2.0 Beta or PhoneSat v2a is a technology demonstration satellite operated by NASA's Ames Research Center, which was launched on 21 April 2013. Part of the PhoneSat programme, it was one of the first three PhoneSat spacecraft, and the first Phonesat-2.0 satellite, to be launched. A PhoneSat-2.0 satellite, Alexander, was built to the single-unit (1U) CubeSat specification, and measures 10 cm (3.9 in) in each dimension. The satellite is based around an off-the-shelf Samsung Electronics Nexus S smartphone which serves in place of an onboard computer. The satellite is equipped with a two-way S-band transponder and solar cells for power generation. The spacecraft uses the phone's gyroscopes, along with a GPS receiver, to determine its position and orientation, and a system of reaction wheels and magnetorquer coils for attitude control.

== TechEdSat-3p ==
TechEdSat-3p
- Names: TES-3
- Mission type: Technology demonstration
- Operator: NASA Ames Research Center · San Jose State University · University of Idaho ·
- COSPAR ID: 1998-067DD (TECHEDS3P)
- SATCAT no.: 39415
- Mission duration: 47 days (achieved)

Spacecraft properties
- Spacecraft type: CubeSat
- Dimensions: 30 cm x 10 cm x 10 cm (3U)

Start of mission
- Launch date: 3 August 2013, 19:48:46 UTC
- Rocket: H-IIB F4
- Launch site: Tanegashima Space Center, Yoshinobu LC-Y2
- Contractor: Mitsubishi Heavy Industries
- Deployment date: 20 November 2013, 07:58 UTC

End of mission
- Decay date: 16 January 2014

Orbital parameters
- Reference system: Geocentric orbit
- Regime: Low Earth orbit
- Perigee altitude: 410 km
- Apogee altitude: 415 km
- Inclination: 51.65°
- Period: 92.81 minutes

TechEdSat-3p was the third spacecraft flown in the TechEdSat series. Its dimensions were approximately 30 cm x 10 cm x 10 cm, or three CubeSat units long, making it three times larger than TechEdSat-1. TechEdSat-3p was launched to the International Space Station (ISS) on 3 August 2013 from Tanegashima Space Center, Japan on the Kounotori 4 (HTV-4) International Space Station cargo resupply mission and subsequently deployed into orbit by the JEM-Small Satellite Orbital Deployer (J-SSOD).

TechEdSat-3p was the first satellite of the TechEdSat series to include an exo-brake, a parachute-like drag device to demonstrate passive deorbit capability. The deployment of an exo-brake increases the surface area of a satellite, increasing its coefficient of drag in the thin upper atmosphere and causing the satellite to deorbit faster than it otherwise would. This technology could be used to more quickly dispose of satellites in Low Earth Orbit that have completed their missions, decreasing the amount of potentially hazardous debris in space. The exo-brake is currently being developed for use as part of the Small Payload Quick Return (SPQR) concept, which would enable science materials to be returned to Earth from the International Space Station whenever is most convenient for scientists rather than just a few times per year aboard a returning cargo resupply vehicle.

According to smallsat logistics company ÅAC Microtech, a main power distribution board designed for TechEdSat-1 was reused on the TechEdSat-3p mission.

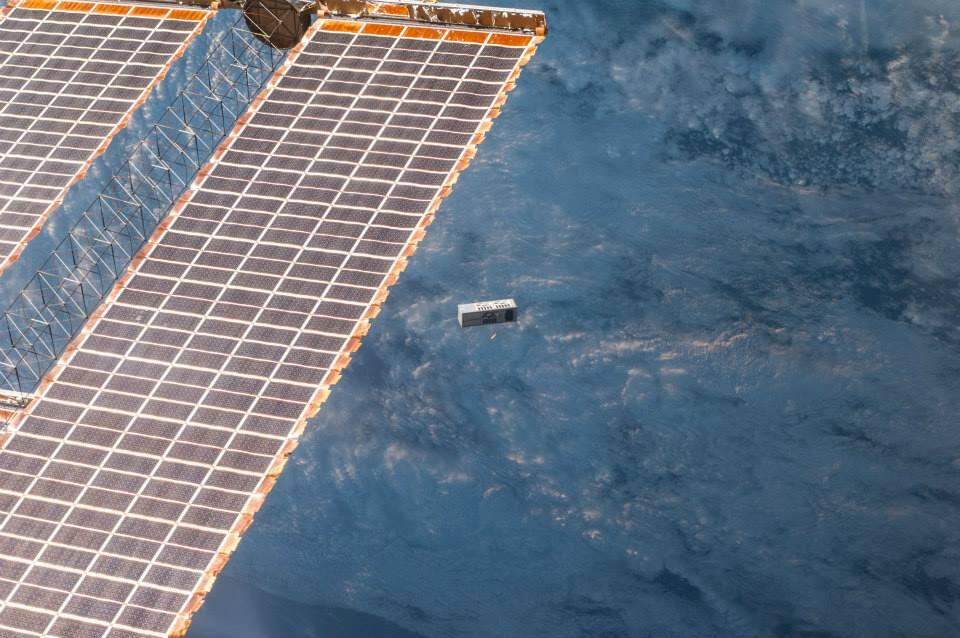
Deployment of the TechEdSat-3p satellite from the ISS

== TechEdSat-4 ==
TechEdSat-4
- Names: TES-4
- Mission type: Technology demonstration
- Operator: NASA Ames Research Center · San Jose State University · University of Idaho
- COSPAR ID: 1998-067FY
- SATCAT no.: 40455
- Mission duration: 263 days

Spacecraft properties
- Spacecraft type: CubeSat
- Launch mass: 3 kg (6.6 lb)
- Dimensions: 10 cm x 10 cm x 30 cm (3U)

Start of mission
- Launch date: 13 July 2014, 16:52:14 UTC
- Rocket: Antares-120
- Launch site: Wallops Island MARS, LP-0A
- Contractor: Orbital Sciences Corporation
- Deployment date: 4 March 2015

End of mission
- Decay date: 3 April 2015

Orbital parameters
- Reference system: Geocentric orbit
- Regime: Low Earth orbit
- Perigee altitude: 393 km (244 miles)
- Apogee altitude: 402 km (250 miles)
- Inclination: 51.64°
- Period: 92.50 minutes

TechEdSat-4 was a 3U CubeSat mission developed, integrated, and tested at NASA Ames Research Center in partnership with student interns from San Jose State University (SJSU) in California and the University of Idaho in Moscow, Idaho. The objective of the TechEdSat-4 mission was to demonstrate new technologies including satellite-to-satellite communications and an upgraded Exo-Brake device to demonstrate a passive deorbiting. TechEdSat-4 was launched as a secondary cargo payload on the Cygnus CRS Orb-2 ISS resupply mission. The launch vehicle was the Orbital Sciences Corporation Antares-120, launching from the Mid-Atlantic Regional Spaceport on Wallops Island, Virginia on 13 July 2014. TechEdSat-4 was deployed from the International Space Station via the Nanoracks CubeSat Deployer on 4 March 2015.

The satellite decayed from orbit on 3 April 2015.

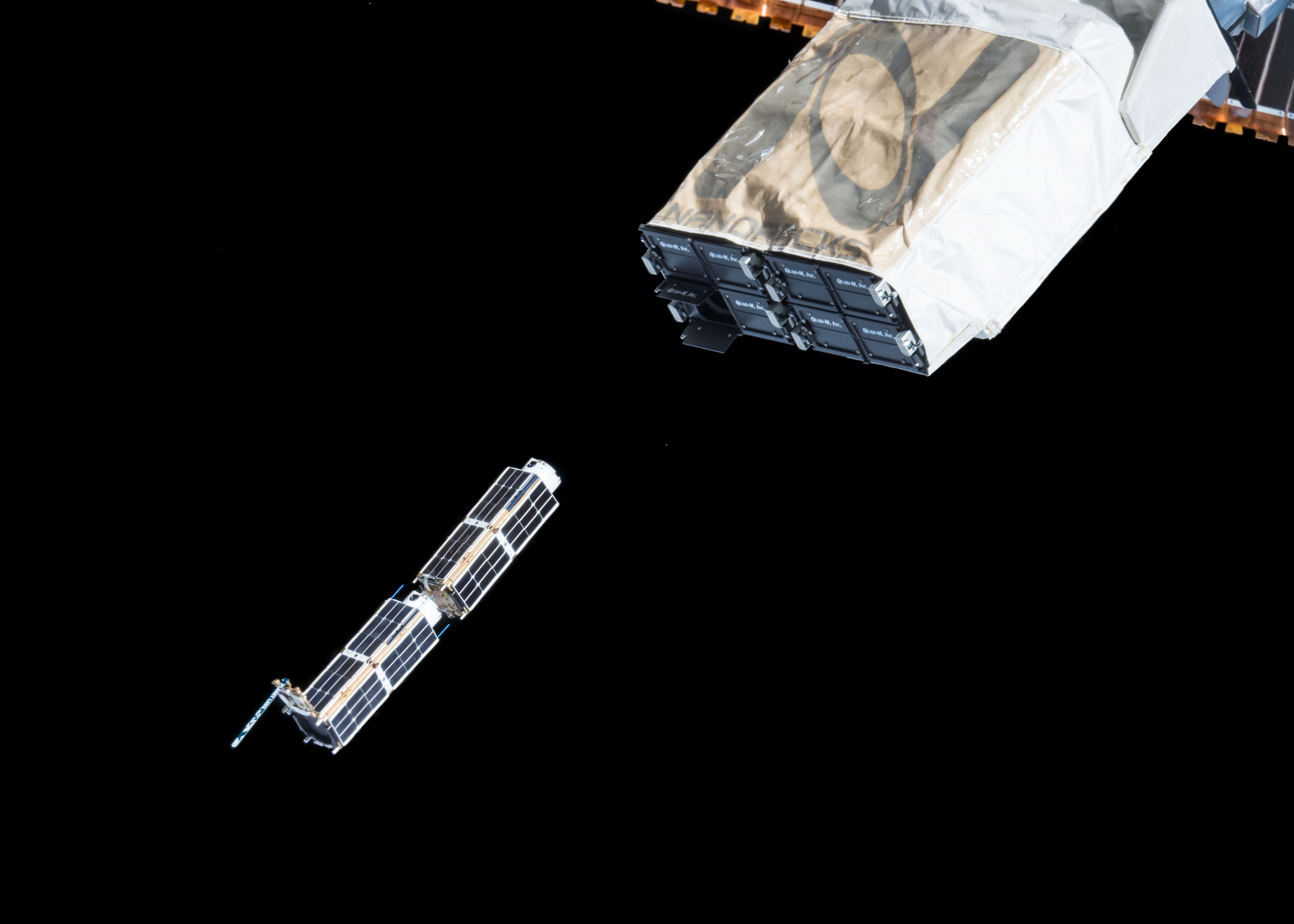
On 27 February 2015, a series of CubeSats, small experimental satellites, were deployed via a special device mounted on the Japanese Experiment Module (JEM) (Kibō module) Remote Manipulator System (JEMRMS). Deployed satellites included twenty Flock-1b satellites, TechEdSat-4, GEARRSAT, LambdaSat, and MicroMAS.

== TechEdSat-5 ==
TechEdSat-5
- Names: TES-5
- Mission type: Technology demonstration
- Operator: NASA Ames Research Center · San Jose State University · University of Idaho
- COSPAR ID: 1998-067LB
- SATCAT no.: 42066
- Mission duration: 144 days

Spacecraft properties
- Spacecraft type: CubeSat
- Launch mass: 4 kg (8.8 lb)
- Dimensions: 10 cm x 10 cm x 35 cm (3.5U)

Start of mission
- Launch date: 9 December 2016
- Rocket: H-IIB F6
- Launch site: Tanegashima Space Center, Yoshinobu LC-Y2
- Contractor: Mitsubishi Heavy Industries
- Deployment date: 6 March 2017, 18:20:00 UTC

End of mission
- Decay date: 29 July 2017

Orbital parameters
- Reference system: Geocentric orbit
- Regime: Low Earth orbit
- Perigee altitude: 397 km (247 miles)
- Apogee altitude: 408 km (254 miles)
- Inclination: 51.64°
- Period: 92.61 minutes

TechEdSat-5 was a 4 kg, 3.5U CubeSat that was launched on 9 December 2016 aboard the Kounotori 6 (HTV-6) cargo resupply spacecraft, and was deployed from the International Space Station (ISS) at 18:20 UTC on 6 March 2017. It was the first satellite in the TechEdSat program to include a modulated Exo-Brake that was could adjust the amount of atmospheric drag on the spacecraft, enabling a targeted re-entry. The TechEdSat-5 Exo-Brake was cross-shaped, made of mylar, and used a combination of mechanical struts and flexible cords. Its surface area was approximately 0.35 square metres. A "Cricket" Wireless Sensor Module (WSM) was included with TechEdSat-5. The satellite reentered the atmosphere on 29 July 2017 after successfully operating for 144 days.

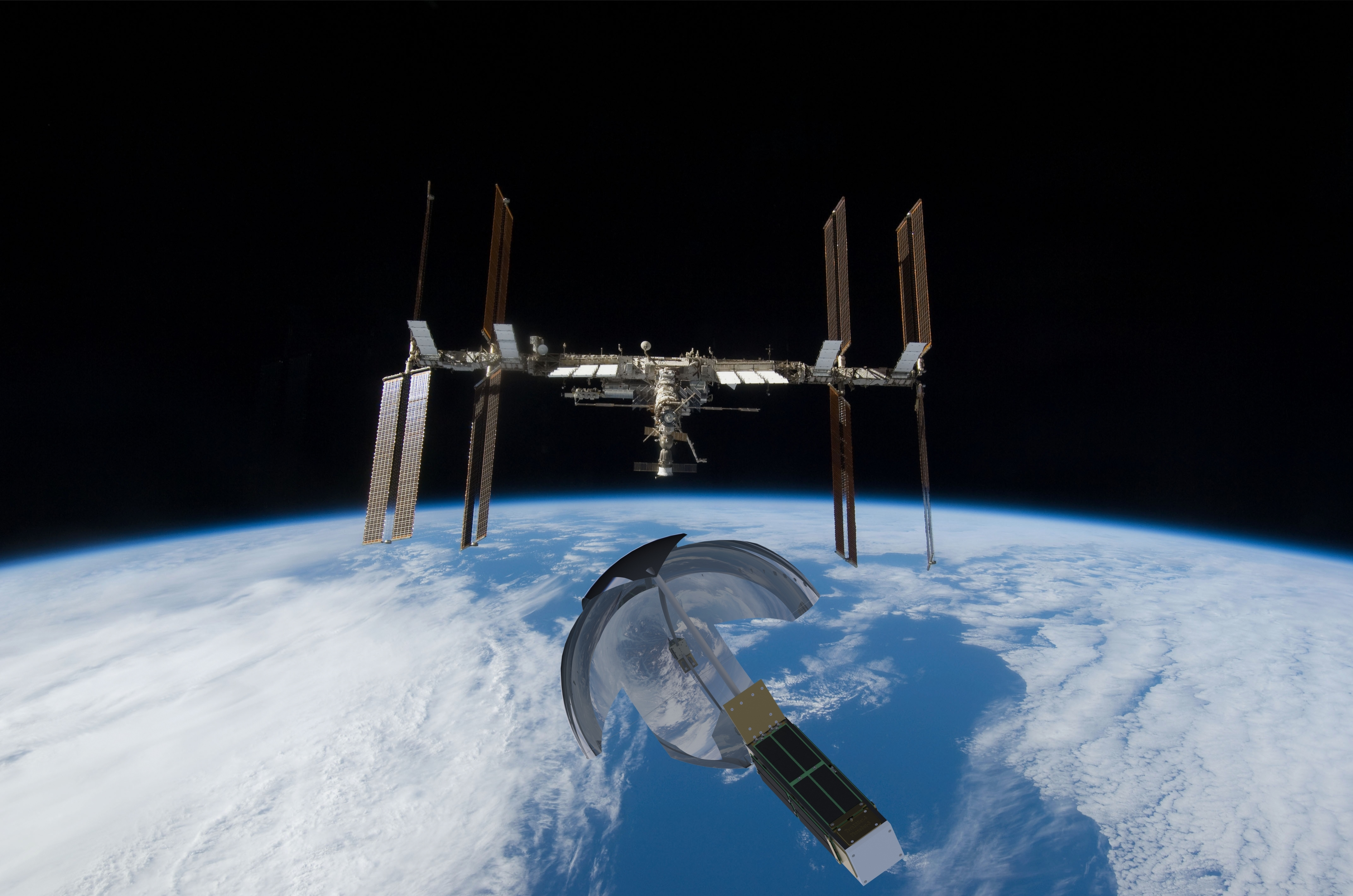
Simulated view of TechEdSat-5 after deployment from the International Space Station

== TechEdSat-6 ==
TechEdSat-6
- Names: TES-6
- Mission type: Technology demonstration
- Operator: NASA Ames Research Center · San Jose State University · University of Idaho
- COSPAR ID: 1998-067NK
- SATCAT no.: 43026
- Mission duration: 175 days (achieved)

Spacecraft properties
- Spacecraft type: CubeSat
- Launch mass: 3.6 kg (7.9 lb)
- Dimensions: 10 cm x 10 cm x 35 cm (3.5U)

Start of mission
- Launch date: 12 November 2017, 12:19:51 UTC
- Rocket: Antares 230
- Launch site: Wallops Island MARS, LP-0A
- Contractor: Orbital Sciences Corporation
- Deployment date: 20 November 2017

End of mission
- Decay date: 14 May 2018

Orbital parameters
- Reference system: Geocentric orbit
- Regime: Low Earth orbit
- Perigee altitude: 397 km (247 mi)
- Apogee altitude: 406 km (252 mi)
- Inclination: 51.65°
- Period: 92.59 minutes

TechEdSat-6 was a CubeSat 3.5U that was launched at 12:19:51 UTC on 12 November 2017 aboard the Cygnus CRS-8 cargo resupply mission to the International Space Station (ISS). It was deployed from the Nanoracks CubeSat Deployer on 20 November 2017. In addition to the primary payload, it contained a CubeSat Identity Tag (CUBIT), a Radio Frequency Identification (RFID) tag developed by DARPA and SRI International to assist in future identification of satellites. It successfully reentered the atmosphere on 14 May 2018.

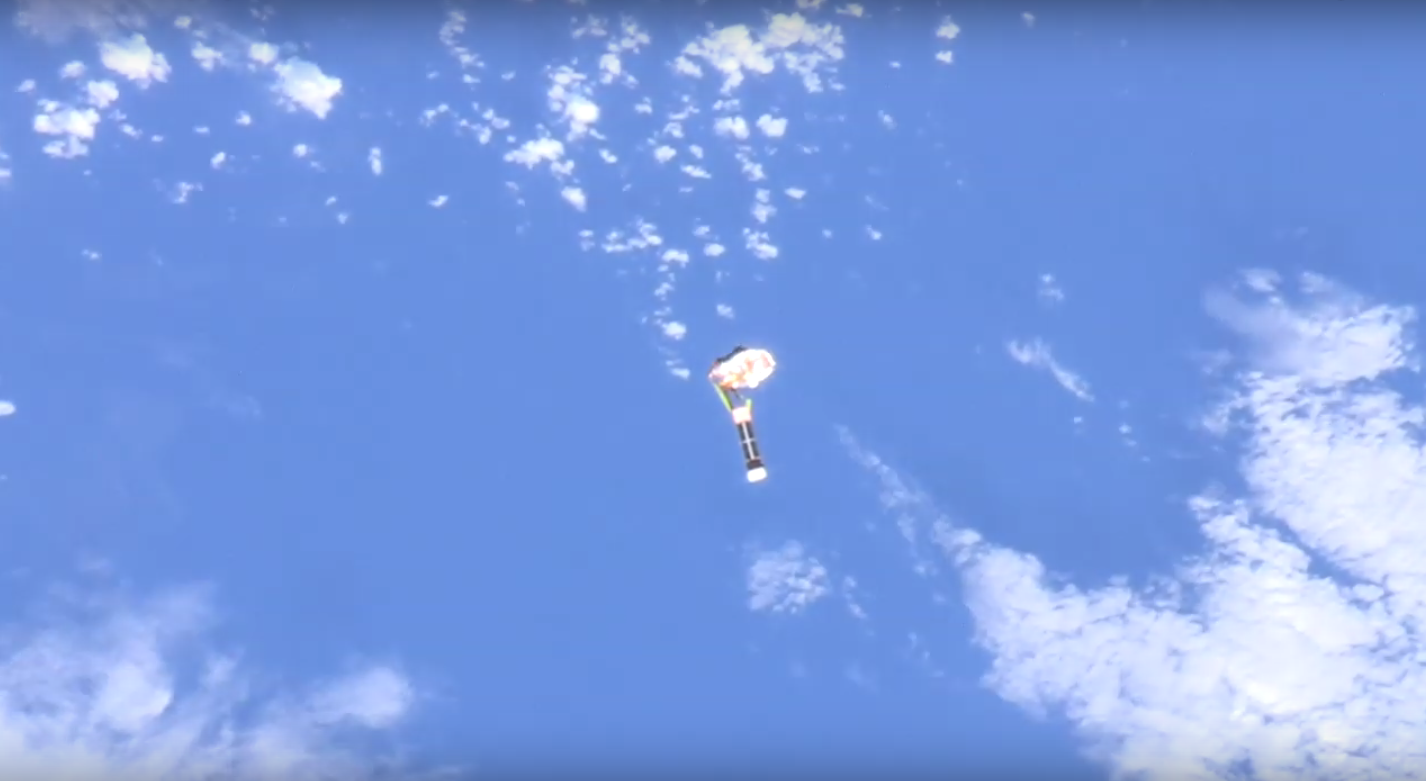
TechEdSat-6, seen here just after being deployed from the International Space Station, was a CubeSat mission that tested technologies intended to make it easier to return science materials to Earth from space.

== TechEdSat-7 ==
TechEdSat-7
- Names: TES-7
- Mission type: Technology demonstration
- Operator: NASA Ames Research Center · San Jose State University
- COSPAR ID: 2021-002D
- SATCAT no.: 47312
- Mission duration: 60 days (planned); 471 days (final)

Spacecraft properties
- Spacecraft type: CubeSat
- Launch mass: 3 kg (6.6 lb)
- Dimensions: 10 cm x 10 cm x 22 cm (2U)

Start of mission
- Launch date: 17 January 2021, 19:39:00 UTC
- Rocket: LauncherOne
- Launch site: Cosmic Girl (Boeing 747), Mojave Air and Space Port, California
- Contractor: Virgin Orbit
- Deployment date: 17 January 2021

End of mission
- Decay date: 4 May 2022

Orbital parameters
- Reference system: Geocentric orbit
- Regime: Low Earth orbit
- Perigee altitude: 485 km (301 mi)
- Apogee altitude: 513 km (319 mi)
- Inclination: 60.7°
- Period: 94.6 minutes

TechEdSat-7 was a 2U CubeSat that was intended to test a High Packing Density Exo-Brake. It was launched on the first successful flight of Virgin Orbit's LauncherOne launch vehicle on 17 January 2021 as part of NASA's ELaNa program. It flew with a CubeSat Identity Tag (CUBIT), a Radio Frequency Identification (RFID) tag developed by DARPA and SRI International to assist in future identification of satellites. The satellite decayed from orbit on 4 May 2022.

== TechEdSat-8 ==
TechEdSat-8
- Names: TES-8; Technical and Educational Satellite-8
- Mission type: Technology demonstration
- Operator: NASA Ames Research Center · San Jose State University · University of Idaho
- COSPAR ID: 1998-067PY
- SATCAT no.: 44032
- Mission duration: 501 days (achieved)

Spacecraft properties
- Spacecraft type: CubeSat
- Launch mass: 6 kg (13 lb)
- Dimensions: 10 cm x 10 cm x 60 cm (6U)

Start of mission
- Launch date: 5 December 2018, 18:16:00 UTC
- Rocket: Falcon 9 Block 5
- Launch site: Cape Canaveral, SLC-40
- Contractor: SpaceX
- Deployment date: 31 January 2019, 16:45 UTC

End of mission
- Decay date: 20 April 2020

Orbital parameters
- Reference system: Geocentric orbit
- Regime: Low Earth orbit
- Perigee altitude: 402 km (250 mi)
- Apogee altitude: 409 km (254 mi)
- Inclination: 51.64°
- Period: 92.67 minutes

TechEdSat-8 was CubeSat 6U. It was built as a conjoined project between San Jose State University (SJSU) and the University of Idaho as a collaborative engineering project, with oversight from the NASA Ames Research Center. It was a technology demonstration mission to further develop and demonstrate the Exo-Brake system through, designed for continued operation in high temperature environments, the full recovery of a payload. It featured a semi-autonomous control system to target the entry face point, as well as capabilities to measure a unique ablation device on the forebody. This technology, known as a "Hot Exo-Brake" could enable more precisely-targeted atmospheric reentries. An ablation device was also flying on the spacecraft.

=== History ===
TechEdSat-8 was selected in 2017 by the CubeSat Launch Initiative (CSLI) of the NASA to be launched as part of the ELaNa program. TechEdSat-8 was originally planned to launch with the Cygnus NG-10 (17 November 2018) cargo resupply mission to the International Space Station as part of the ELaNa program, but instead was launched aboard the SpaceX CRS-16 ISS cargo resupply mission at 18:16 UTC on 5 December 2018, arriving at the International Space Station (ISS) on 8 December 2018.

=== Deployment ===
TechEdSat-8 was deployed into orbit by the NanoRacks CubeSat Deployer (NRCSD) at 16:45 UTC on 31 January 2019.

=== Mission ===
The satellite established communication with controllers and, as of 20 February 2019, was reportedly performing well in advance of a targeted reentry. The satellite failed shortly after deployment due to a loss of power from its solar panels, and re-entered in the atmosphere of Earth on 20 April 2020.

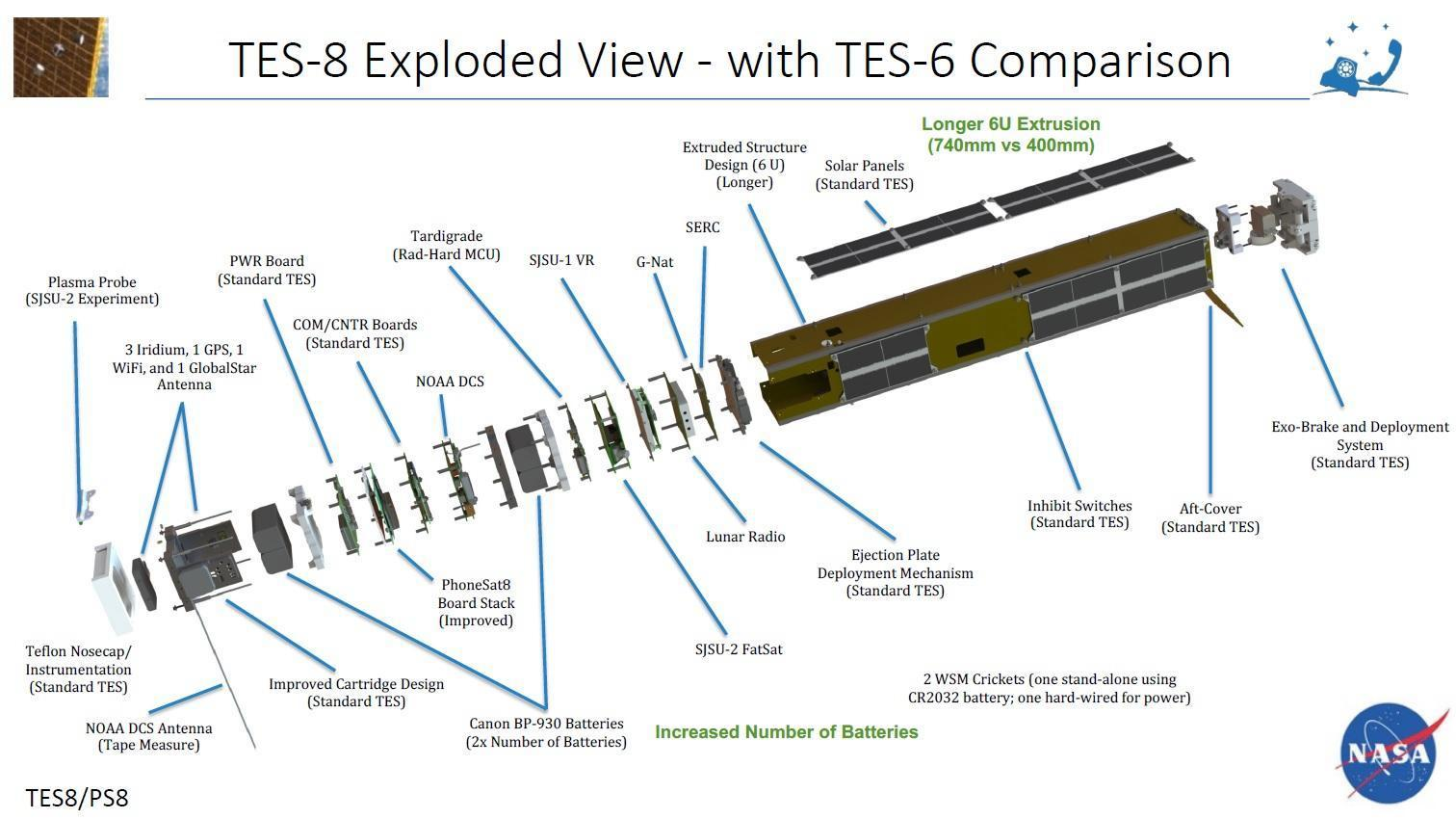
An exploded view of TechEdSat-8, a satellite designed to test communication and precision deorbit technologies.

== TechEdSat-10 ==
TechEdSat-10
- Names: TES-10
- Mission type: Technology demonstration
- Operator: NASA Ames Research Center · San Jose State University
- COSPAR ID: 2020-067RQ
- SATCAT no.: 45917
- Mission duration: 393 days (final)

Spacecraft properties
- Spacecraft type: CubeSat
- Launch mass: 6 kg (13 lb)
- Dimensions: 10 cm x 10 cm x 60 cm (6U)
- Power: 150 watt-hour

Start of mission
- Launch date: 15 February 2020, 20:21:01 UTC
- Rocket: Antares 230+
- Launch site: MARS, LP-0A
- Contractor: Northrop Grumman
- Deployment date: 13 July 2020, 16:55:25 UTC

End of mission
- Decay date: 15 March 2021, 08:37:00 UTC

Orbital parameters
- Reference system: Geocentric orbit
- Regime: Low Earth orbit
- Perigee altitude: 413 km (257 mi)
- Apogee altitude: 419 km (260 mi)
- Inclination: 51.60°
- Period: 92.00 minutes

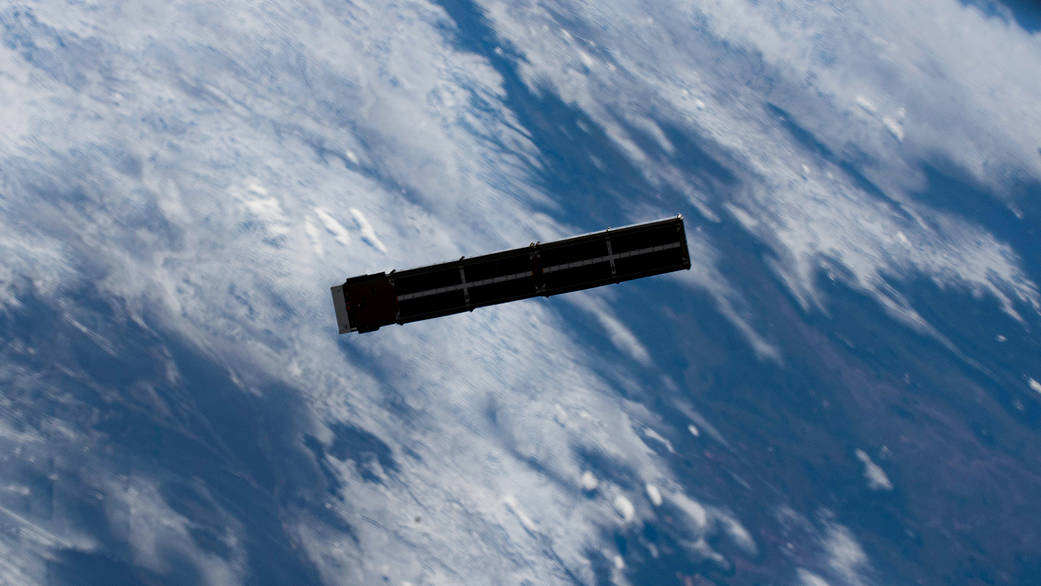
TechEdSat-10 deploys from the International Space Station

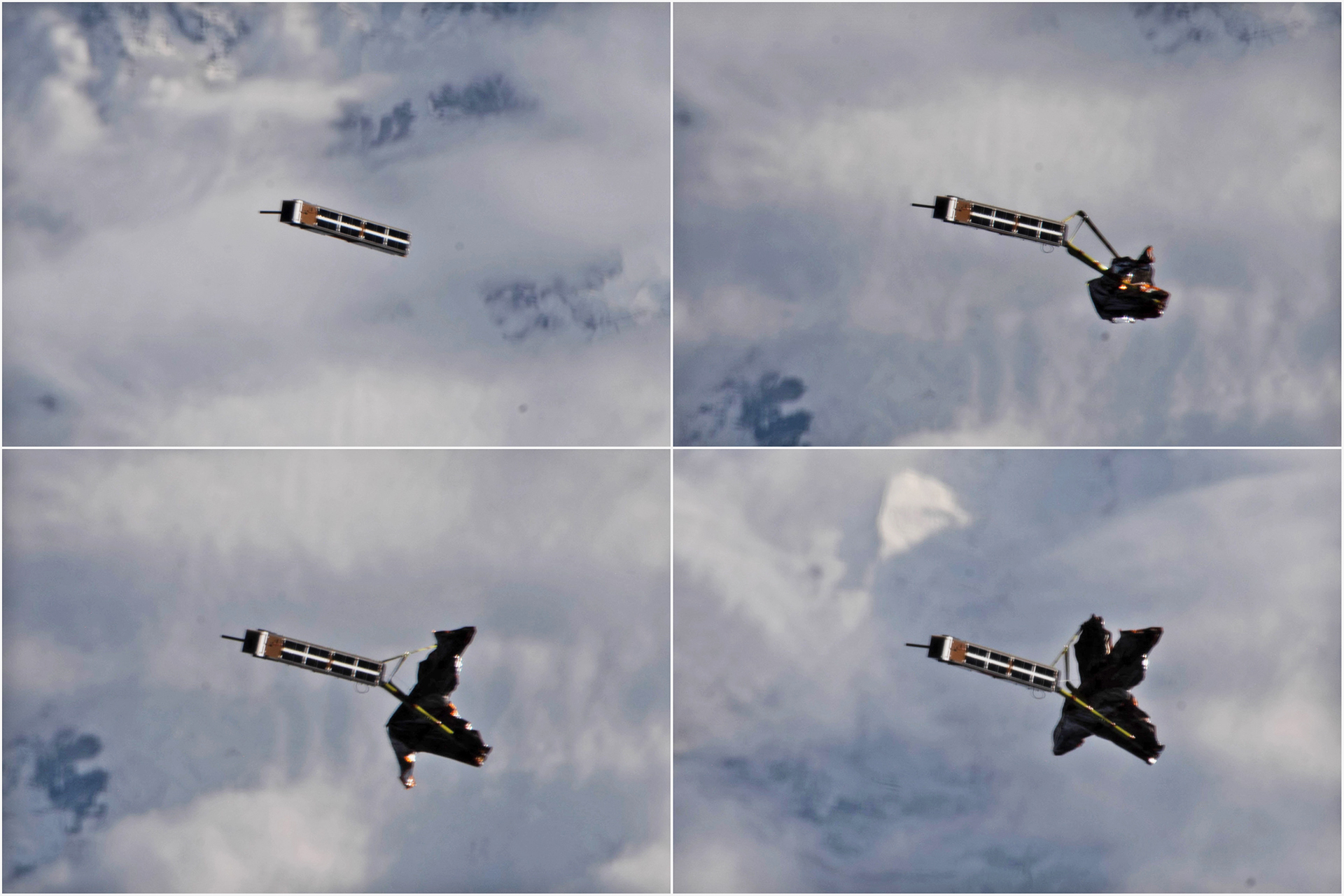
TechEdSat-10 exo-brake precision de-orbit technology demonstration deploying in orbit around Earth.

TechEdSat-10 (TES-10) was a 6U (1 x 6U) CubeSat that was selected in 2018 to launch as part of the ELaNa program.

=== Launch ===
On 15 February 2020, TechEdSat-10 was launched to the International Space Station (ISS) aboard the Cygnus NG-13 cargo spacecraft.

=== Deployment ===
Deployed on 13 July 2020, TechEdSat-10 tested radio communication devices, precision deorbit technologies for National Oceanic and Atmospheric Administration (NOAA) and others, radiation tolerant electronics, and artificial intelligence hardware for future experiments.

=== Mission ===
The mission demonstrated increased storage and power capabilities that could enable future science and exploration using small spacecraft beyond low-Earth orbit. Included on TechEdSat-10 were improvements over previous CubeSat technologies in the areas of communications and radio systems, and new propulsion techniques.

As the tenth iteration in the Technology Educational Satellite (TES) series, TechEdSat-10 built upon a history of the program's innovative work with early career researchers, students, and volunteers. TechEdSat-10 contained 150 watt-hours of power storage, eight radios, nine processors, and a graphics processing unit. Additionally, the small satellite carried four cameras, including a stereoscopic virtual reality camera experiment.

Like several TechEdSat missions before it, this mission demonstrated the exo-brake technology in its largest iteration to date. The exo-brake was designed to deploy an umbrella-like "brake" to increase drag and take a small satellite out of orbit. This mission, the exo-brake could be controlled or modulated by commands from the ground in order to target a re-entry point. In the future, this could enable sample return missions from orbit and future planetary missions.

== TechEdSat-11 ==
TechEdSat-11
- Names: TES-11
- Mission type: Technology demonstration
- Operator: NASA Ames Research Center · San Jose State University
- COSPAR ID: 2024-125F
- SATCAT no.: 60208

Spacecraft properties
- Spacecraft type: CubeSat
- Launch mass: 7 kg (15 lb)
- Dimensions: (6U)

Start of mission
- Launch date: 4 July 2024
- Rocket: Firefly Alpha
- Launch site: Vandenberg AFB, California
- Contractor: Firefly Aerospace
- Deployment date: 4 July 2024, 04:50:01 UTC

End of mission
- Decay date: 15 February 2026 UTC

Orbital parameters
- Reference system: Geocentric orbit
- Regime: Low Earth orbit
- Perigee altitude: 490 km (300 mi)
- Apogee altitude: 525 km (326 mi)
- Inclination: 97.4°
- Period: 94.8 minutes

TechEdSat-11 was a 6U CubeSat. Its goal is to test a set of next-generation communication experiments for CubeSats. It re-entered the atmosphere on 15 February 2026 following successful deployment of an exobrake device a few weeks prior.

== TechEdSat-13 ==
TechEdSat-13
- Names: TES-13
- Mission type: Technology demonstration
- Operator: NASA Ames Research Center · San Jose State University
- COSPAR ID: 2022-003B
- SATCAT no.: 51095
- Mission duration: 252 days (planned); 912 days (actual)

Spacecraft properties
- Spacecraft type: CubeSat
- Launch mass: 4 kg (8.8 lb)
- Dimensions: 10 cm x 10 cm x 34 cm (3U)

Start of mission
- Launch date: 13 January 2022
- Rocket: LauncherOne # 4
- Launch site: Cosmic Girl (Boeing 747), Mojave Air and Space Port, California
- Contractor: Virgin Orbit
- Deployment date: 13 January 2022, 23:47:00 UTC

End of mission
- Decay date: 13 July 2024, 19:52:00 UTC

Orbital parameters
- Reference system: Geocentric orbit
- Regime: Low Earth orbit
- Perigee altitude: 499 km (310 mi)
- Apogee altitude: 509 km (316 mi)
- Inclination: 45.0°
- Period: 92.6 minutes

TechEdSat-13 is a 3U CubeSat that is intended to test and validate three different technologies, including an Exo-Brake. Along with other cubesats (PAN-A and B, GEARRS-3, SteamSat-2, STORK-3, ADLER-1) it was launched on the third successful flight of Virgin Orbit's LauncherOne launch vehicle on 13 January 2022 as part of the STP-27VP mission ("Above the Clouds"). TechEdSat-13 uses the Loihi neuromorphic chip, representing an artificial intelligence/machine learning (AI/ML) payload application.

== TechEdSat-15 ==
TechEdSat-15
- Names: TES-15
- Mission type: Technology demonstration
- Operator: NASA Ames Research Center · San Jose State University
- COSPAR ID: 2022-122?
- SATCAT no.: 5395?
- Mission duration: 4 days (final)

Spacecraft properties
- Spacecraft type: CubeSat
- Launch mass: 4.5 kg (9.9 lb)
- Dimensions: 10 cm x 10 cm x 34 cm (3U)

Start of mission
- Launch date: 1 October 2022, 07:01:00 UTC
- Rocket: Firefly Alpha
- Launch site: Vandenberg AFB, California
- Contractor: Firefly Aerospace
- Deployment date: 1 October 2022

End of mission
- Decay date: 6 October 2022

Orbital parameters
- Reference system: Geocentric orbit
- Regime: Low Earth orbit
- Perigee altitude: 215 km (134 mi)
- Apogee altitude: 285 km (177 mi)
- Inclination: 137.0°
- Period: 89.6 minutes

TechEdSat-15 was a 3U CubeSat. It was launched on 1 October 2022 as a rideshare payload on a Firefly Alpha rocket. Despite it being its first mission reaching Earth orbit, due to a lower-than-intended deployment orbit most of the satellites re-entered before reaching their intended design life.

== Future TechEdSats ==
TechEdSat-9 is planned to fly at some point in the future. TechEdSat-9, like TechEdSat-10, is planned to test radio communication technologies for National Oceanic and Atmospheric Administration (NOAA) and others.

TechEdSat-12 will test technologies for the tracking and identification of small satellites. It will carry a radio-frequency identification (RFID) tag, a radar reflector, and an L-band antenna. It was selected for launch in February 2020 by NASA's CubeSat Launch Initiative, and will be delivered to orbit on a launch contracted through the ELaNa program.
