= Kounotori 3 =

2012 Japanese resupply spaceflight to the ISS

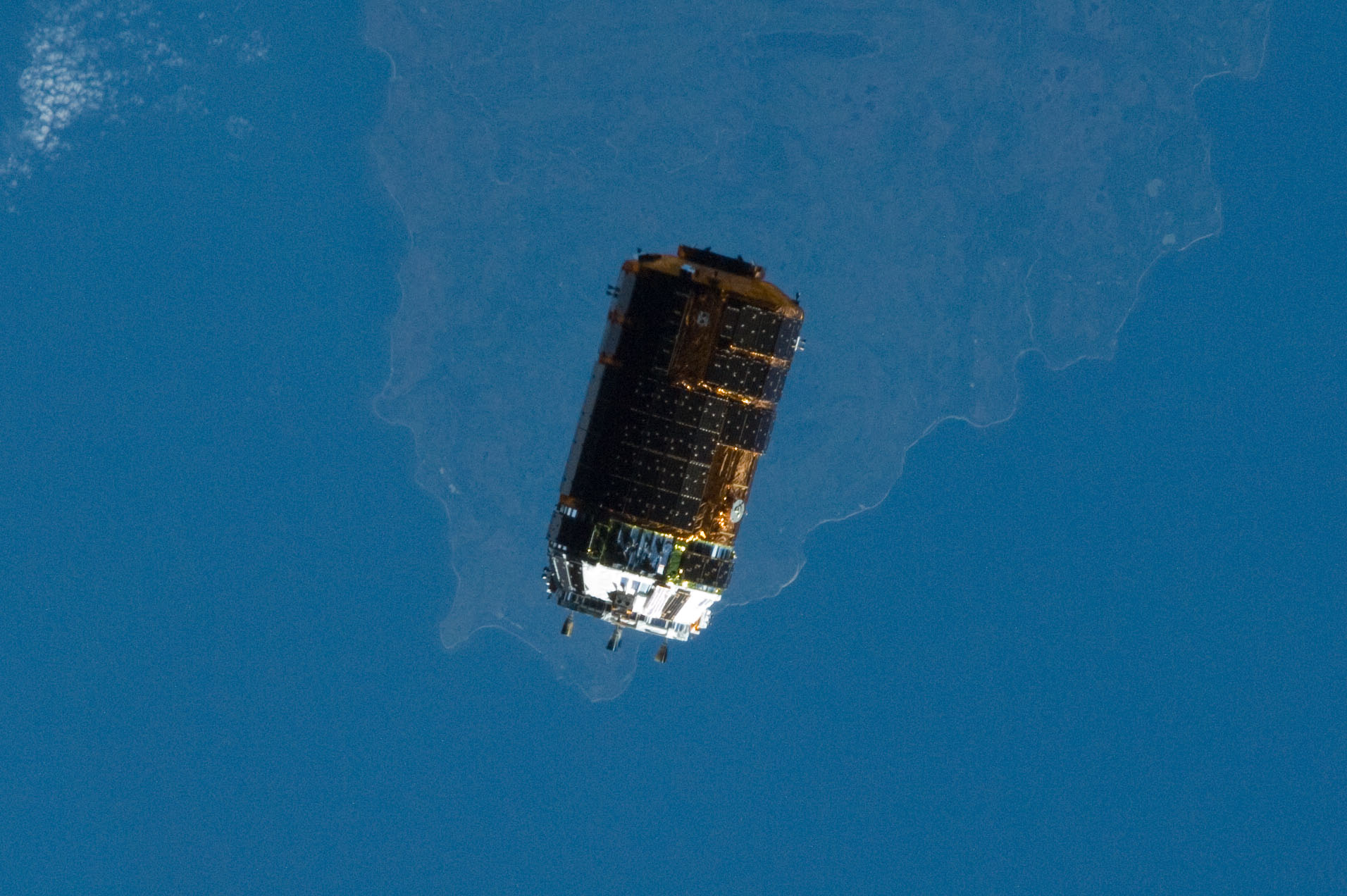
- Kounotori 3 approaches the ISS on 27 July 2012.
- Mission type: ISS resupply
- Operator: Japan Aerospace Exploration Agency (JAXA)
- COSPAR ID: 2012-038A
- SATCAT no.: 38706
- Mission duration: 55 days

Spacecraft properties
- Spacecraft: Kounotori 3
- Spacecraft type: H-II Transfer Vehicle
- Manufacturer: Mitsubishi Heavy Industries
- Launch mass: 15400 kg
- Dry mass: 10800 kg (note: mass without cargo)

Start of mission
- Launch date: 21 July 2012, 02:06:18 UTC
- Rocket: H-IIB No. 3
- Launch site: Tanegashima, Yoshinobu-2
- Contractor: Mitsubishi Heavy Industries

End of mission
- Disposal: Deorbited
- Decay date: 14 September 2012, 05:27 UTC

Orbital parameters
- Reference system: Geocentric orbit
- Regime: Low Earth orbit
- Inclination: 51.66°
- Epoch: 27 July 2012

Berthing at ISS
- Berthing port: Harmony nadir
- RMS capture: 27 July 2012, 12:23 UTC
- Berthing date: 27 July 2012, 14:34 UTC
- Unberthing date: 11 September 2012, 11:50 UTC
- RMS release: 12 September 2012, 15:50 UTC
- Time berthed: 46 days

Cargo
- Mass: 4600 kg
- Pressurised: 3500 kg
- Unpressurised: 1100 kg
- HTV ISS Resupply

Kounotori 3 (Japanese: こうのとり3号機; English: "white stork"), also known as HTV-3, was the third flight of the Japanese H-II Transfer Vehicle. It was launched on 21 July 2012 to resupply the International Space Station (ISS) aboard the H-IIB Launch Vehicle No. 3 (H-IIB F3) manufactured by Mitsubishi Heavy Industries (MHI) and JAXA. Kounotori 3 arrived at the ISS on 27 July 2012, and Expedition 32 Flight Engineer and JAXA astronaut Akihiko Hoshide used the International Space Station's Canadarm2 robotic arm to install Kounotori 3, to its docking port on the Earth-facing side (nadir) of the Harmony module at 14:34 UTC.

After the supplies are unloaded, Kounotori 3 was loaded with waste material from ISS, including used experiment equipment and used clothes. Then Kounotori 3 was unberthed from the ISS on 11 September 2012 and burned up upon reentering in the atmosphere of Earth on 14 September 2012.

== Specifications ==
Major changes of Kounotori 3 from previous Kounotori are:

- Change of thrusters to the ones by IHI Aerospace: 500 N class HBT-5 and 120 N class HBT-1 thrusters
- Change of communication equipment
- First use of EP-MP (Exposed Pallet–Multi-Purpose)
- A re-designed pallet that is somewhat lighter than the previous ones
- Simplification of Exposed Pallet holding mechanism

The ground operation was improved to allow more late access cargo.

== Cargo items ==
Kounotori 3 carries approximately 4,600 kilograms (10,100 lb) cargo, consisting of 3,500 kilograms (7,700 lb) in pressurized compartment and 1,100 kilograms (2,400 lb) in unpressurized compartment.

The pressurised cargo consists of system equipment (61%), science experiments (20%), food (15%), and crew commodities (4%). It includes: Aquatic Habitat (AQH), JEM Small-Satellite Orbital Deployer (J-SSOD), five CubeSats: (RAIKO, FITSAT-1, WE WISH, F-1, TechEdSat), i-Ball and REBR reentry data recorders, ISS SERVIR Environmental Research and Visualization System (ISERV). Additionally, loaded onto Kounotori 3's Resupply Racks was NASA's Water Pump Assembly (WPA) catalytic reactor to replace the former unit that broke in March 2012 in orbit and a cooling water circulation pump to replace the old unit in the Japanese Experiment Module (Kibō) that also broke at the end of March 2012.

The AQuatic Habitat (high-tech aquarium) (AQH) can be used to house small fish for up to 90 days. "As a result, aquatic breeding over three generations, from fish parents to grandkids, previously impossible in space shuttle experiments, has become a reality", NASA said in a press kit. The AQH experimental device allows scientists and researchers to observe the birth of space aquatic creatures that have never experienced Earth's gravity, enabling them to better understand how the space environment affects animals beyond generations in preparation for potential long-term space travel in future. Medaka (Oryzias latipes) will be bred and observed in the AQH experimental device.

Two experiments, originally designed by the winners of the international YouTube Space Lab competition, would examine how Bacillus subtilis and the Jumping spider would react to microgravity.

The J-SSOD and five CubeSats are part of a technology experiment to test the feasibility of whether small satellites can be released without spacewalks. Using this method, satellites contained in bags will be launched facilitating future satellite design.

During the destructive re-entry at the end of the Kounotori 3 mission, i-Ball attempts to collect re-entry data. The globular-shaped i-Ball, a Re-Entry Data Recorder produced in Japan, will descend using a parachute after withstanding the high heat of re-entry using ablative shielding and will send data after splashdown via an Iridium satellite. Although i-Ball stays afloat for a while for data transmission, it sinks in the water eventually and not be recovered.

Unpressurized cargo consists of Multi-mission Consolidated Equipment (MCE) and Space Communications and Navigation Program (SCaN Testbed). An image of the fictional character Wheatley from the puzzle game Portal 2 saying "In spaaaaaace!" was laser engraved onto a panel on the resupply craft.

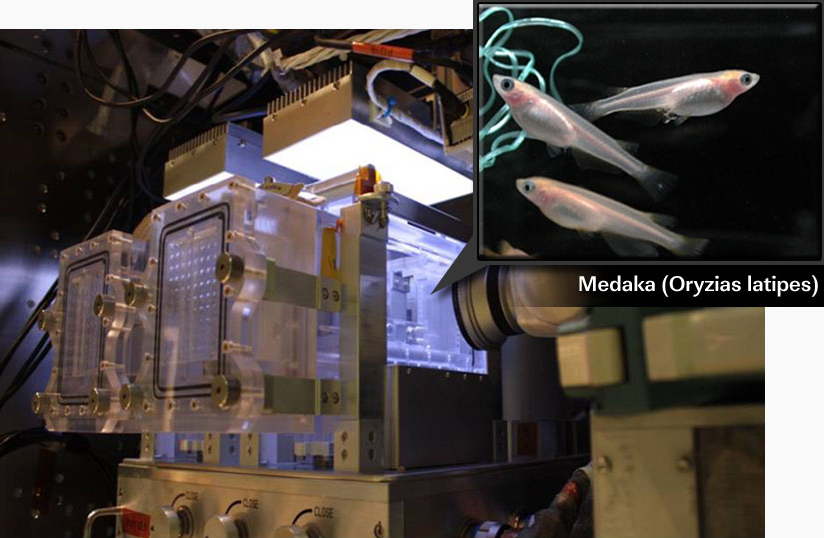
Aquatic Habitat experimental device

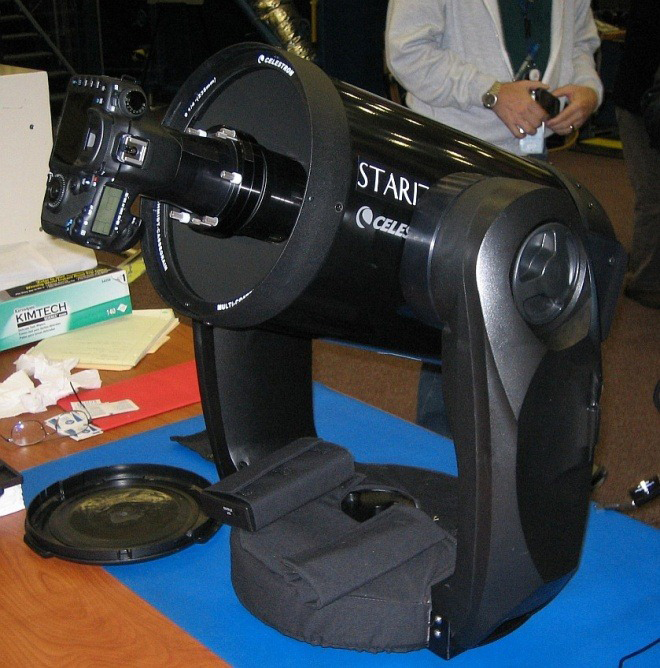
The ISERV camera

== Operation ==
=== Launch ===
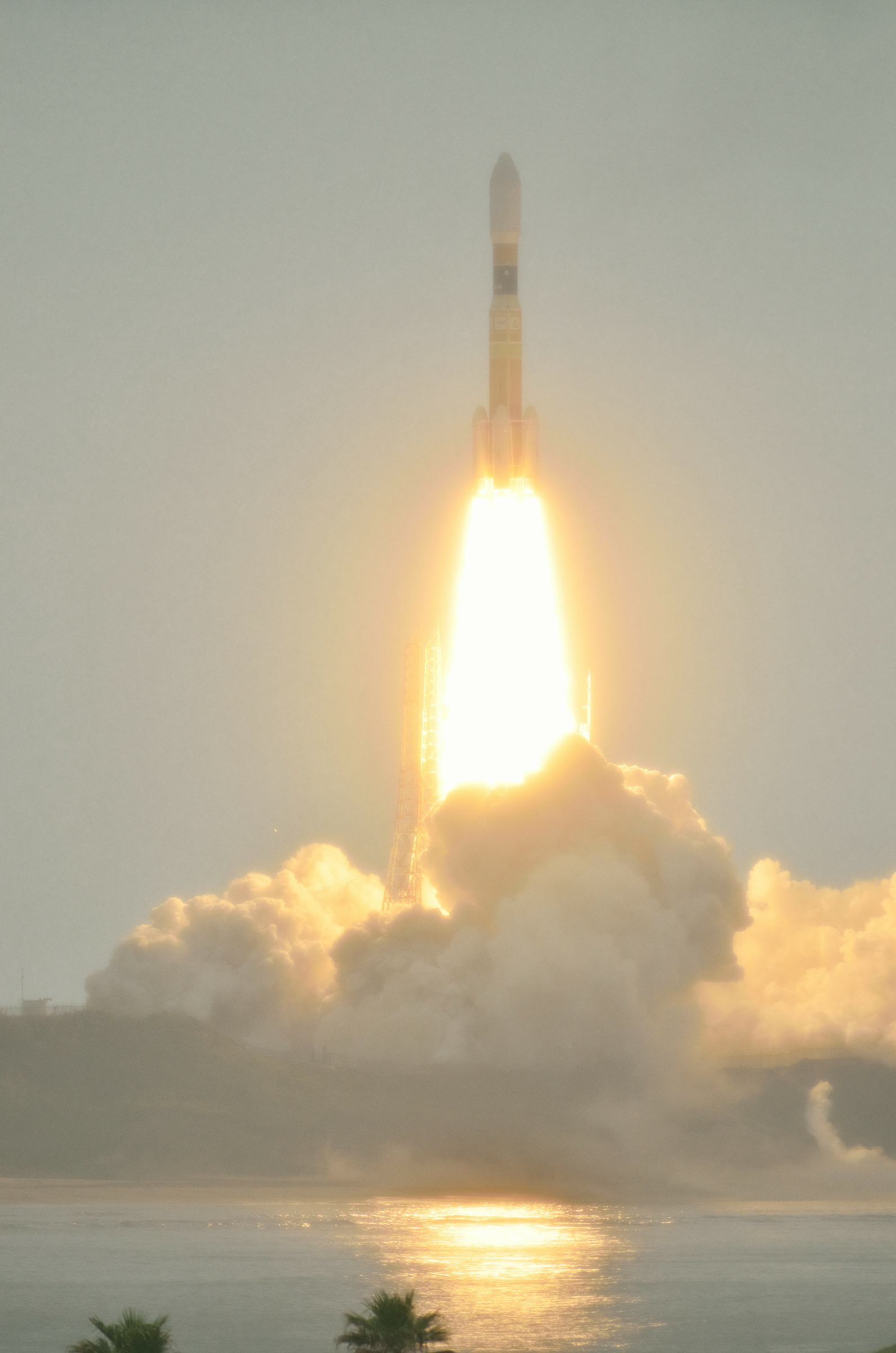
The H-IIB rocket carrying Kounotori 3 lifts off from the Tanegashima space center on 21 July 2012.

Kounotori 3 was launched aboard H-IIB rocket from Tanegashima Space Center at 02:06:18 UTC (11:06:18 JST) on 21 July 2012. The rocket flew smoothly arching out over the Pacific Ocean on a southeasterly trajectory 51.66° titled to the Equator. Two minutes after liftoff, the four strap-on solid rocket boosters separated from the launch vehicle and fell away in pairs as planned. The second stage then ignited and continued the push Kounotori 3 to orbit. Four minutes into the flight the H-IIB jettisoned the payload fairing and the first stage. After igniting the second stage engine, the H-IIB inserted Kounotori 3 into its preferred initial orbit with separation confirmed at 14 minutes and 53 minutes after liftoff. Following the successful separation of Kounotori 3, the second stage engines were re-ignited for another time to perform a controlled re-entry test. The second stage dropped into the South Pacific Ocean shortly afterwards. There were no apparent launch problems during the entire flight of the H-IIB rocket.

At the time of the H-IIB launch, the weather was rainy, a wind speed was 2.3 m/s from the west-northwest and the temperature was 27.1 °C.

=== Berthing ===
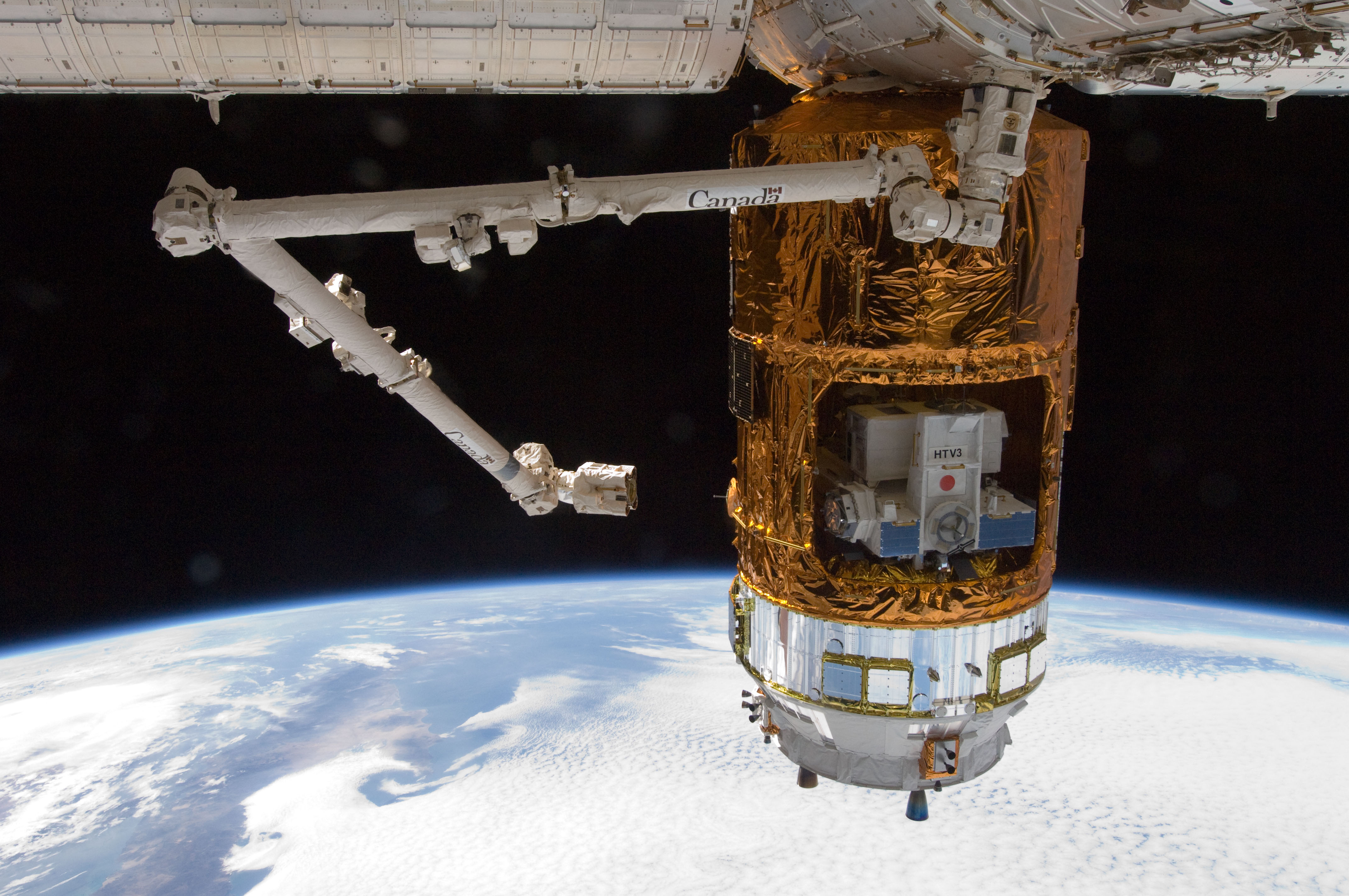
The HTV-3 berthed to the Earth-facing port of the Harmony module on 27 July 2012.

In orbit, Kounotori 3 began a week-long phasing period where its orbit was gradually adjusted. Kounotori 3 rendezvous burns were performed using four newly designed Japanese engines, as the two previous HTVs used engines made by U.S. company Aerojet. During the same period, Kounotori 3 underwent a series of pre-docking tests to precisely align the spacecraft with the ISS.

The capture and berthing operations of HTV-3 took place on 27 July 2012. Upon reaching the communications zone, the spacecraft began to use the proximity operations system located in the JEM module on the ISS, to communicate with the station. Once Kounotori 3 was within about 9 metres (30 ft) and began station-keeping, Mission control in Houston issued the space station crew the "GO" for the capture of the spacecraft with the robotic arm of the space station. That command was radioed up by CAPCOM Catherine Coleman, who had performed the capture of Kounotori 2 in 2011.

Kounotori 3 was placed into free-drift and NASA astronaut Joseph M. Acaba, operating the station's robot arm, captured the HTV's grapple fixture at 12:23 UTC. Then robotic operators on the ground in Mission control in Houston (ROBO team) completed the manoeuvre of the HTV to the pre-berthing position at the nadir port (Earth-facing) of the space station's Harmony module. The JAXA astronaut and flight engineer of Expedition 32/33 Akihiko Hoshide then resumed berthing operations, moving the spacecraft into the interface for installation. This marked the first time that a Japanese astronaut assisted in the capture of a Japanese spacecraft. Sixteen remotely controlled bolts were gradually electrically driven in the common berthing mechanism at 14:24 UTC to finish the attachment of Kounotori 3 to the ISS at 14:34 UTC. Expedition 32 crew members opened the hatch of Kounotori 3 at 08:23 UTC on 28 July 2012 and entered Kounotori 3's Pressurized Logistics Carrier (PLC) to begin removing cargo supplies from inside the PLC.

The Exposed Pallet (EP), which carried MCE and SCaN Testbed, was extracted from Kounotori's Unpressurized Logistics Carrier by Robotic operators on the ground using the ISS's robotic arm. The EP was then handed off to the JEM Robotic arm, being operated by Akihiko Hoshide, and installed to the Kibō's Exposed Facility on 6 August 2012 6. After MCE and SCaN Testbed was removed from the pallet and installed to their places on ISS, Exposed Pallet was returned to Kounotori on 10 August 2012.

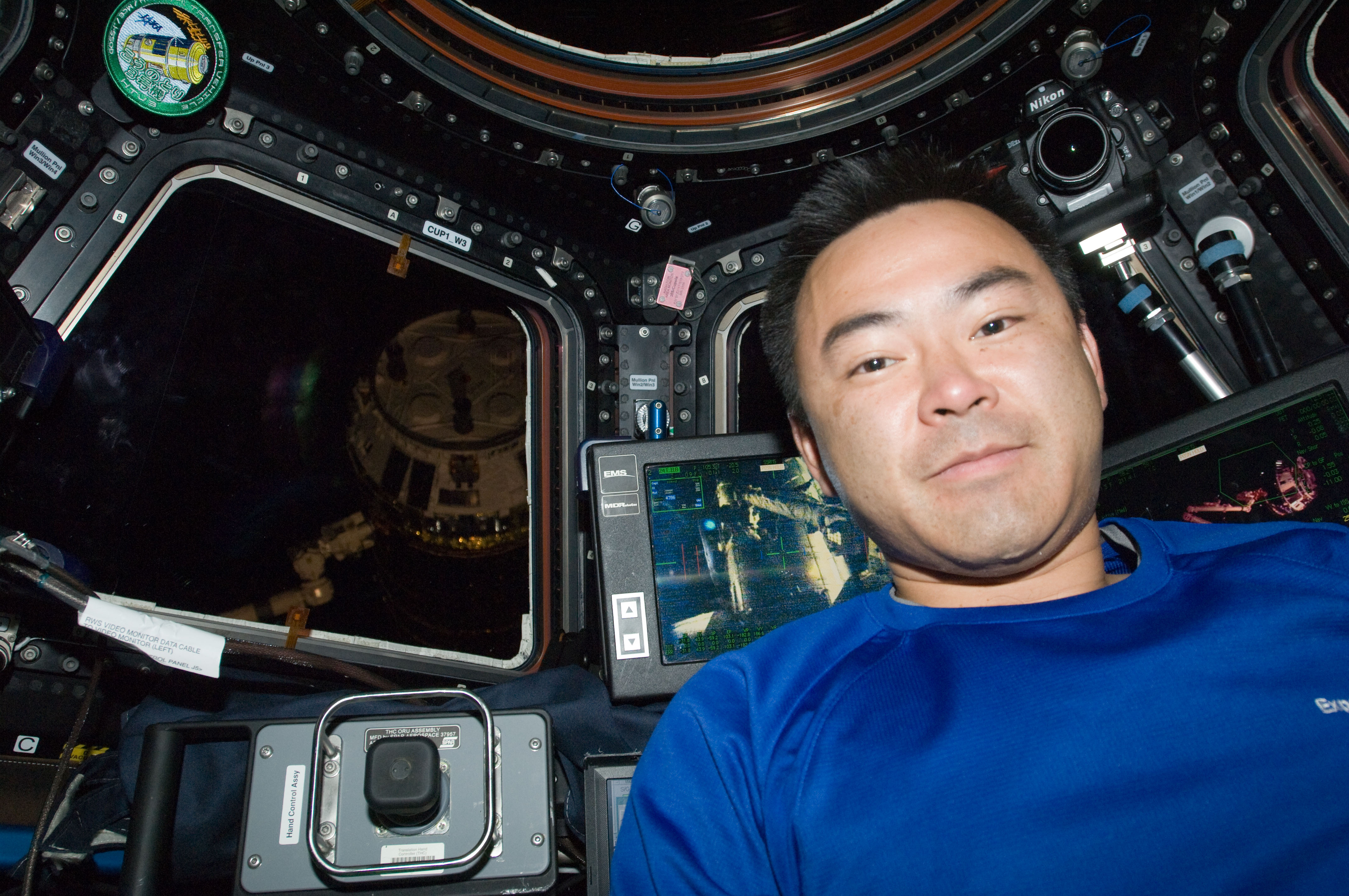
The JAXA astronaut Akihiko Hoshide in the Cupola during the rendezvous operations.

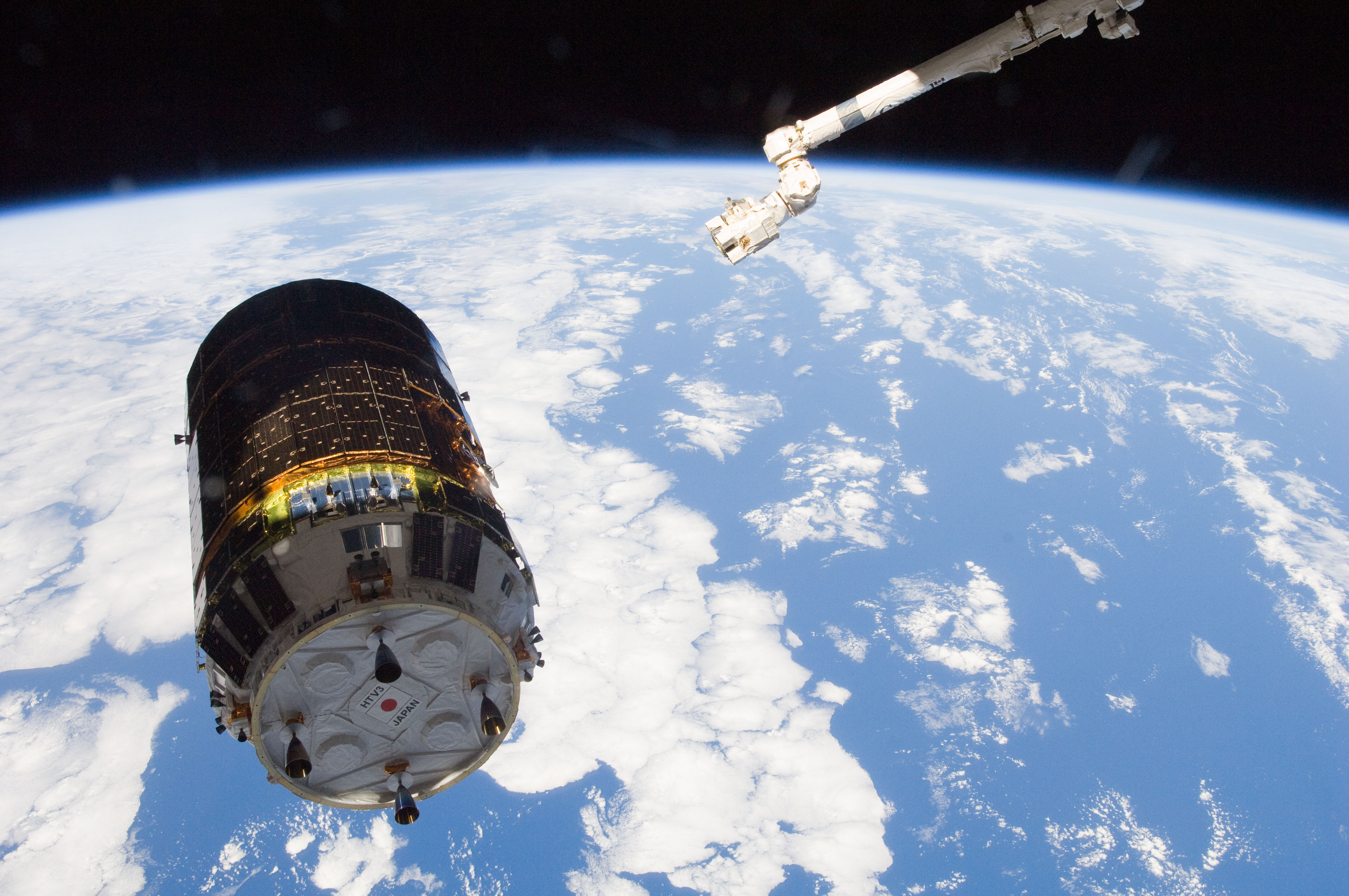
The Canadarm2 moves towards the HTV-3 for capture.

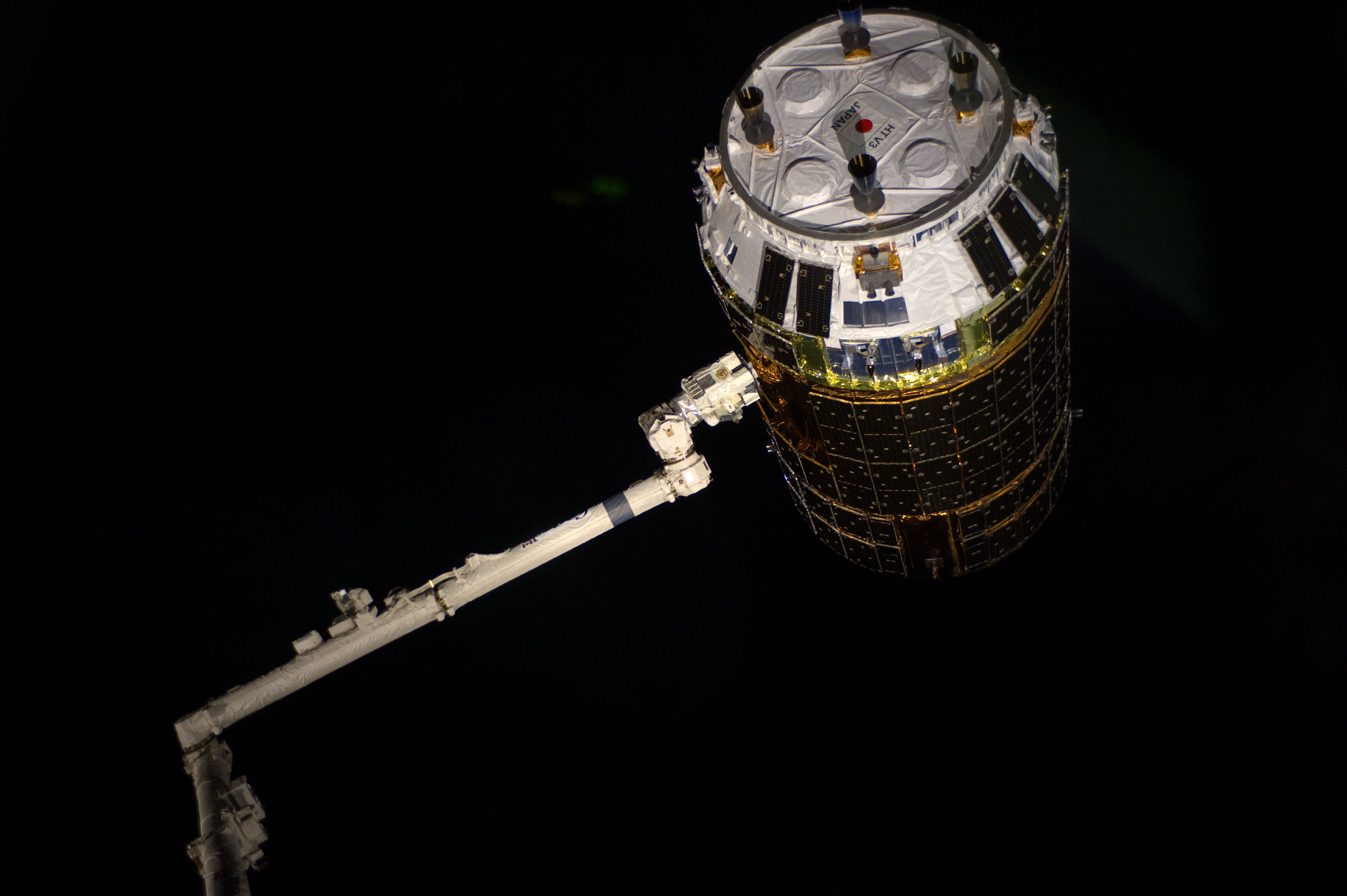
The HTV-3 is grappled by the Canadarm2.

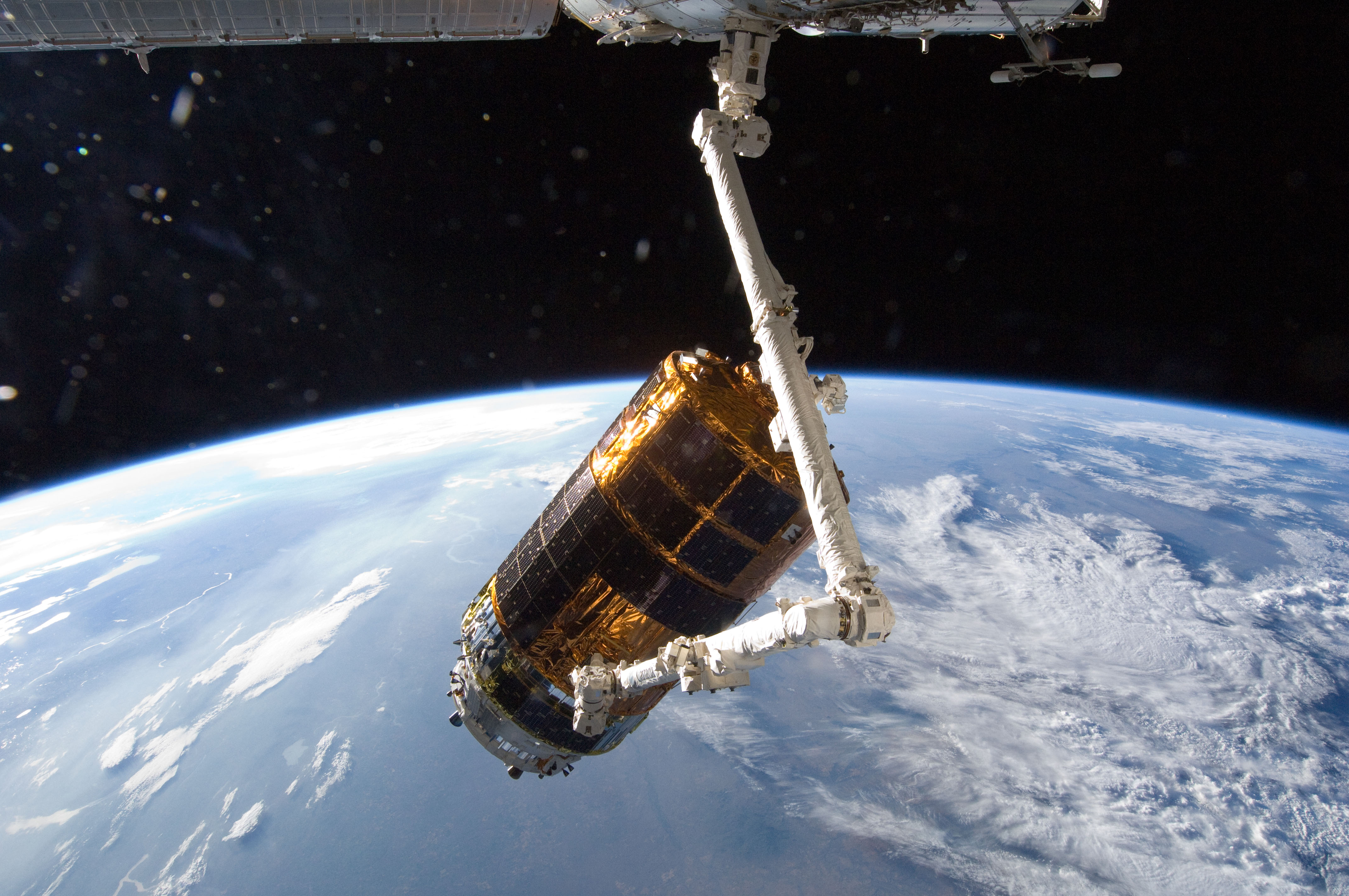
The HTV-3 is gradually being moved towards its berthing location at the ISS.

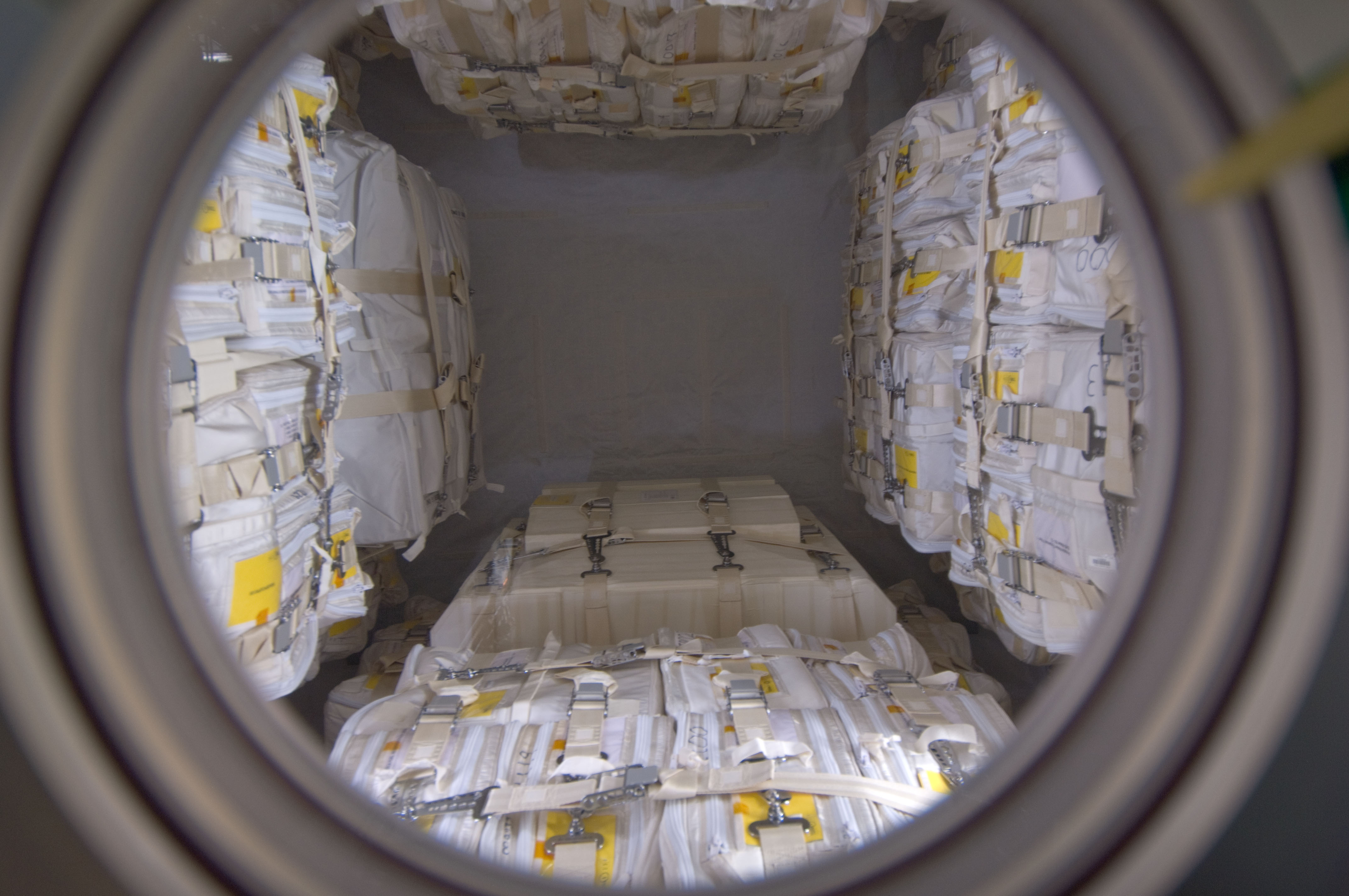
The interior of HTV-3 photographed by an Expedition 32 crewmember.

=== Departure and reentry to Earth atmosphere ===
Kounotori 3 was scheduled to be detached on 6 September 2012 but was postponed due to the scheduling of ISS activity. In preparation for unberthing, the Re-Entry Data Recorder (REBR) and the i-Ball were installed and activated, and the hatch was closed on 11 September 2012.

Kounotori 3 was unberthed by SSRMS (Canadarm2) at 11:50 UTC, 11 September 2012, and released at 15:50 UTC, 12 September 2012. A few minutes after release when leaving from ISS, Kounotori 3 entered abort sequence, quickly leaving to fore of ISS orbit instead of the nominal gradual lower-fore trajectory. SpaceFlightNow reported that it was triggered by a failure of In/out Computer 2, citing daily space station On-Orbit Status posted on a NASA website. NASA's ISS On-Orbit Status does not mention any non-nominal event.

At the press briefing, HTV Flight Director Takashi Uchiyama said that it was activated due to the residual motion of HTV after the release by SSRMS (Canadarm2), which was considered to exceed the free fall bounding box before nominal activation of departure manoeuvre. Later, Aviation Week & Space Technology reported that it was caused by the friction between Kounotori's grapple fixture and the station's robotic arm.

After de-orbit burns, Kounotori 3 entered atmosphere and was destroyed around 05:27 UTC on 14 September 2012. The i-Ball and REBR (Re-Entry Data Recorder) data were retrieved successfully.

== See also ==
- H-II Transfer Vehicle
- HTV-1
- HTV-2
- Uncrewed spaceflights to the International Space Station
