= WE WISH =

Japanese commercial CubeSat

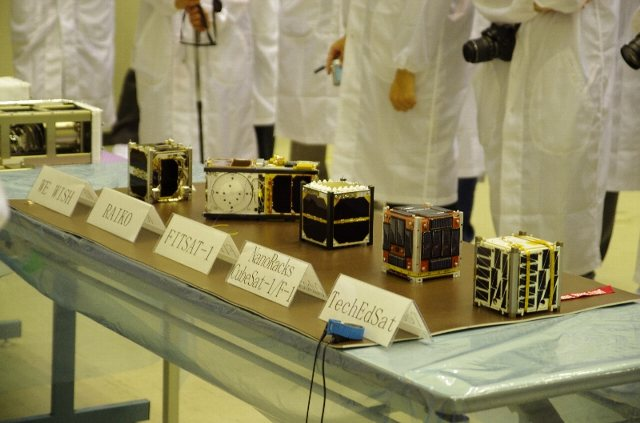
- A collection of CubeSats at Tsukuba Space Center prior to their launch in 2012, with WE WISH visible on the far left
- Mission type: Technology demonstration Amateur radio Earth observation
- Operator: Meisei Amateur Radio Club
- COSPAR ID: 2012-038F (1998-067CS)
- SATCAT no.: 38856
- Mission duration: 158 days (achieved); 100 days (planned)

Spacecraft properties
- Spacecraft type: CubeSat
- Bus: CubeSat
- Manufacturer: Meisei Electric; Meisei Amateur Radio Club
- Launch mass: 1 kg (2.2 lb)
- Dimensions: 10 cm x 10 cm x 10 cm (1U)

Start of mission
- Launch date: 21 July 2012, 02:06:18 UTC
- Rocket: H-IIB F3
- Launch site: Tanegashima, Yoshinobu LC-Y2
- Contractor: Mitsubishi Heavy Industries
- Deployed from: ISS Kibō; Delivered by Kounotori 3
- Deployment date: 4 October 2012, 15:44:15.297 UTC

End of mission
- Decay date: 11 March 2013

Orbital parameters
- Reference system: Geocentric orbit
- Regime: Low Earth orbit
- Perigee altitude: 399 km (248 mi)
- Apogee altitude: 424 km (263 mi)
- Inclination: 51.6°
- Period: 92.79 minutes

WE WISH (World Environmental Watching and Investigation from Space Height) was a Japanese CubeSat developed by Meisei Electric and the Meisei Amateur Radio Club. Launched in 21 July 2012 and deployed from the International Space Station in October, it demonstrated technology for transmitting Earth-observation images captured by an infrared camera via amateur radio. The satellite completed 158 days in orbit before re-entering Earth's atmosphere on 11 March 2013.

== Mission ==
The spacecraft was launched on 21 July 2012. It was deployed, along with the other CubeSats, from Japanese Experiment Module (JEM) Kibō via the Japanese Experiment Module-Small Satellite Orbital Deployer (J-SSOD) system on 4 October 2012. WE WISH had two stated purposes. One was to contribute to technology education at local schools and to promote the use of data from small satellites. The other was to demonstrate subsystems that Meisei Electric had developed for CubeSats, including a small thermal infrared camera, a power supply system and an attitude control system. The satellite was also designed to downlink its images over amateur radio, so that radio operators could receive them directly.

== Deployment ==
WE WISH was among the first satellites deployed from the Japanese Experiment Module (Kibo) of the ISS. The CubeSats were loaded into two pods of the J-SSOD deployer: WE WISH and the 2U science CubeSat RAIKO were in one pod, and TechEdSat, F-1 and FITSAT-1 in the other. The Kibo robotic arm grappled the deployer in the airlock and moved it away from the station, and the first pod, with WE WISH and RAIKO, was released at 14:37 UTC (23:37 JST) on 4 October 2012, about an hour before the second pod at 15:44 UTC. Earlier deployments of amateur-radio satellites from the ISS had required astronauts to perform a spacewalk, and the robotic-arm method opened the way to a larger number of deployments.

After deployment, the team succeeded in receiving radio signals from WE WISH. The satellite carried an infrared camera for environmental studies and transmitted images of the Earth's surface of 320 by 256 pixels using slow-scan television (SSTV), with each image taking about 110 seconds to send. An SSTV image from the satellite was received by the radio amateur JE1CVL on the day of deployment. Air resistance in the upper atmosphere gradually lowered its altitude until it re-entered the atmosphere on 11 March 2013.
