= QZS-6 =

Japanese navigation satellite

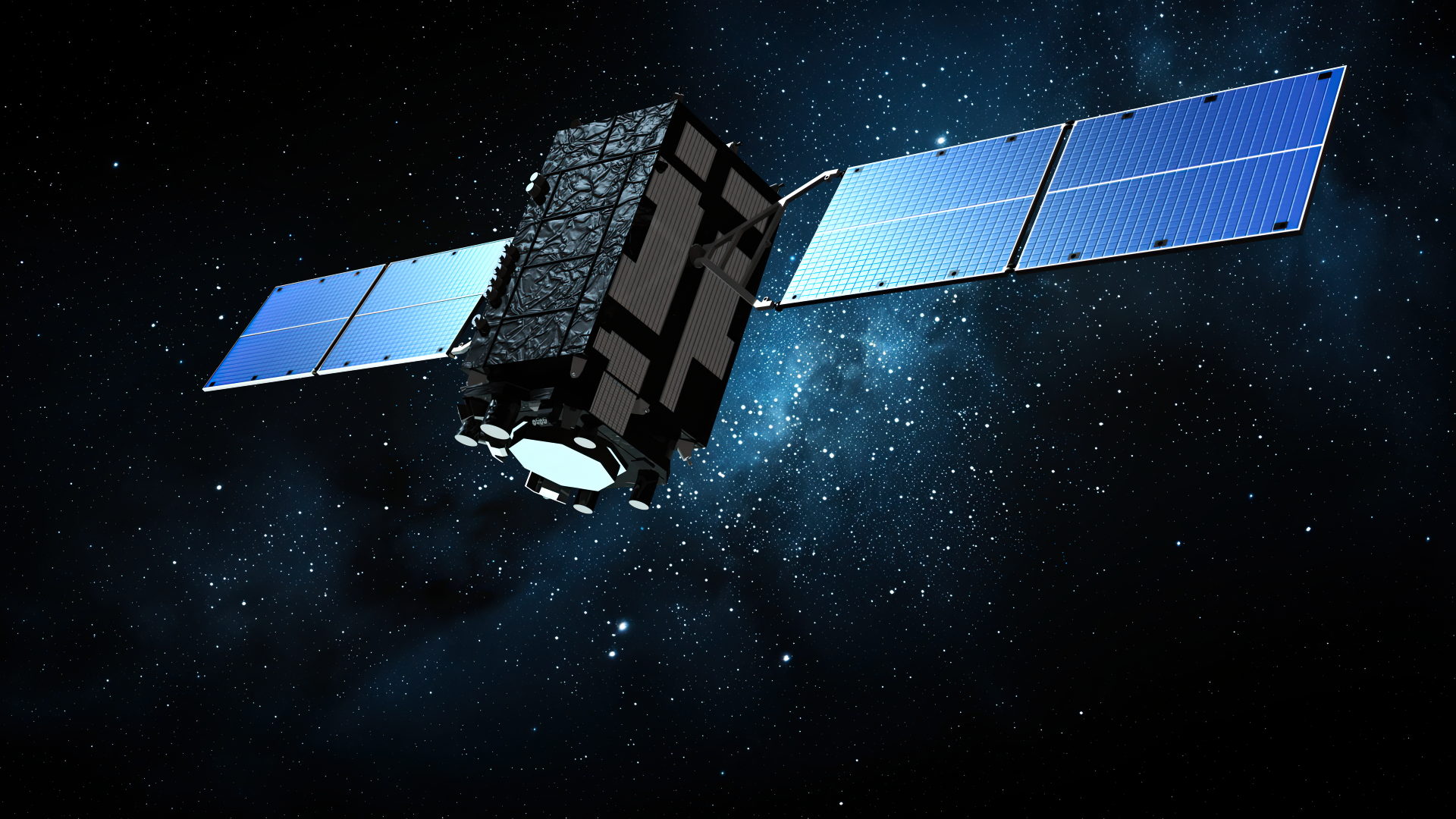
- Artist's rendering of QZS-6 in orbit
- Mission type: Navigation
- Operator: CAO
- COSPAR ID: 2025-023A
- SATCAT no.: 62876
- Website: https://qzss.go.jp/

Spacecraft properties
- Spacecraft type: QZS Block III-G
- Bus: DS2000
- Manufacturer: Mitsubishi Electric
- Launch mass: 4.8t
- Dry mass: 2.0t
- Payload mass: 647kg
- Dimensions: 5 × 2.3 × 2.36 m (20 × 8 × 8 ft)
- Power: 6.7kW

Start of mission
- Launch date: 2 February 2025, 08:30:00 UTC
- Rocket: H3-22S
- Launch site: Tanegashima, LA-Y2
- Contractor: JAXA

Orbital parameters
- Reference system: Geocentric
- Regime: Geostationary orbit

QZS-6 (Michibiki No.6) is a Japanese navigation satellite consisting part of the Quasi-Zenith Satellite System (QZSS). QZS-6 was deployed to a geostationary orbit (GEO). With the launch of QZS-5, QZS-6, and QZS-7, the QZSS will expand from a GNSS augmentation service to an independent regional navigation satellite system (RNSS) covering the Asia-Pacific region.

== Satellite ==
QZS-6 is the first of three Michibiki satellites to be launched to expand QZSS to a seven-satellite constellation. In 2017, Michibiki's four-satellite constellation was established, and with it there are at a minimum two Michibiki satellites (one in QZO and one in GEO) constantly visible from Japan. Satellite navigation requires at least four satellites to be visible, so users need to receive signals from QZSS and other global navigation satellite system (GNSS) at the same time. In its seven-satellite constellation, four Michibiki satellites (one in QZO, two in GEO, and one in quasi-geostationary orbit (QGEO)) will be constantly visible from Japan, thus eliminating the system's dependency on other GNSS. QZS-6 joined QZS-3 in geostationary orbit.

QZS-6 was manufactured by Mitsubishi Electric (MELCO), and its positioning mission payload was manufactured by NEC. QZS-6 has a design life of 15 years. The satellite has a Precise Ranging Payload (PRP) consisting of Inter-satellite ranging (ISR) and satellite/ground bi-directional ranging. PRP enables the satellite to achieve a precise positioning measurement compared to previous Michibiki satellites. The Japan Aerospace Exploration Agency's Advanced Satellite Navigation System (ASNAV) project is responsible for Michibiki's PRP. For ISR, QZS-6 will receive signals sent from QZS-5 and will measure the distance between them.

=== Secondary payload ===
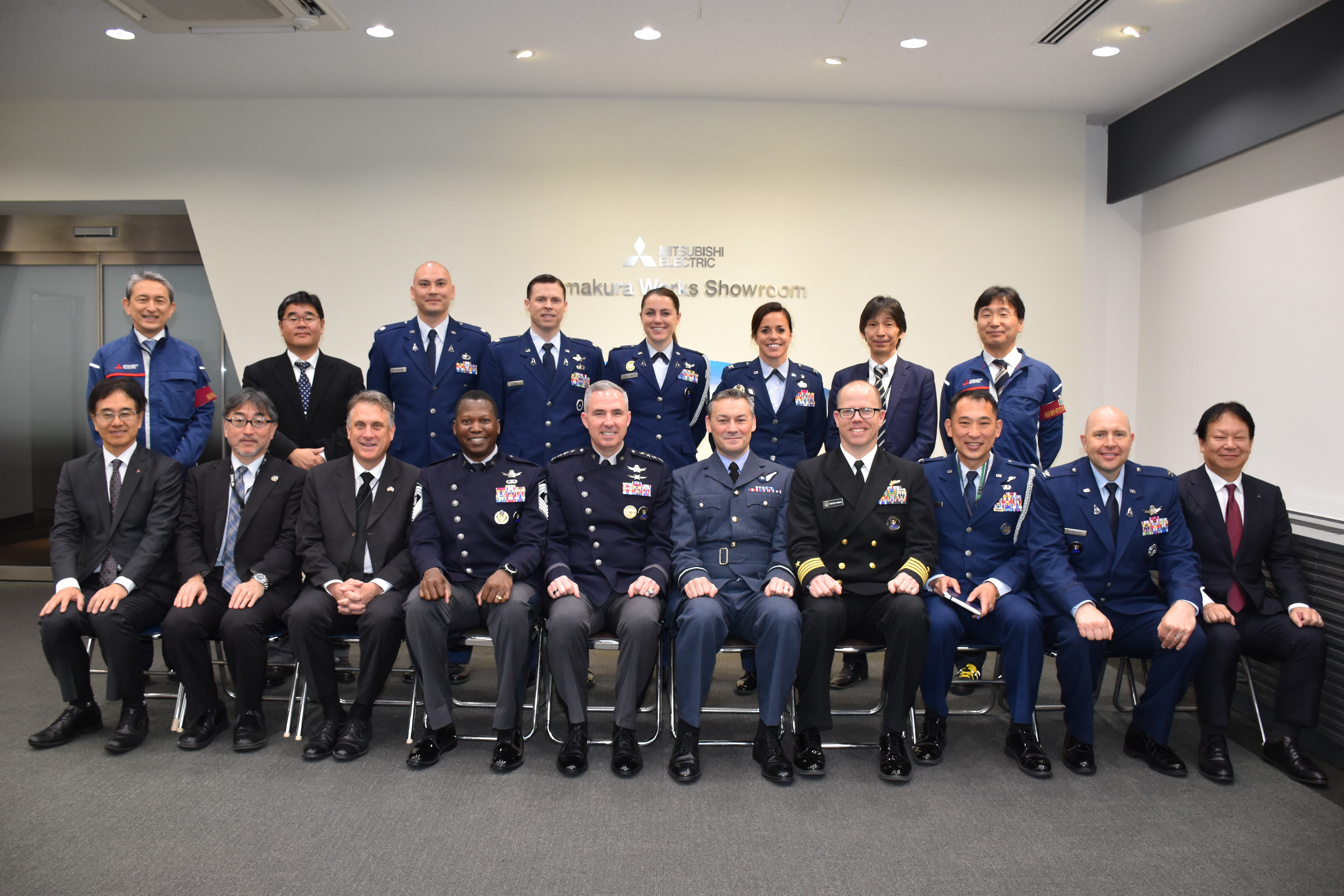
United States Space Command delegation visiting Mitsubishi Electric's Kamakura Works

Following a Memorandum of Understanding between the governments of Japan and the United States made on 15 December 2020 regarding hosted payloads, QZS-6 hosts a secondary payload from the United States Space Force as part of the Quasi-Zenith Satellite System Hosted Payload (QZSS-HP) framework, called QZS6-HP1. The US Space Force Mission Delta 2's Situational Awareness Camera Hosted Instrument (SĀCHI, meaning 'search' in Japanese), developed by MIT Lincoln Laboratory, is a space domain awareness (SDA) payload that will monitor objects in geosynchronous orbit and send the data in near real time to the SDA database at Schriever Space Force Base. QZS-6 is the third foreign-owned satellite to carry a US Space Force payload, following Space Norway's ASBM 1 and 2.

== Launch ==
QZS-6 was launched on 2 February 2025. By May 2025, the US Space Force's QZS6-HP1 achieved first light.

== Comparison of QZS-5, 6, and 7 ==
Comparison of QZS-5, 6, and 7
Schematics of satellite	QZS-5	QZS-6	QZS-7
Design life (after launch)	15 years		
Launch date	22 December 2025	2 February 2025	10 August 2026
Orbit	QZO	GEO	QGEO
Rocket	H3-22S		
Mass (dry/launch)	1.8t/4.8t	1.9t/4.9t	2.0t/5.0t
Block type	III-Q	III-G	III-G
Payload electricity consumption	2.4kW	2.7kW	3.0kW
Position, Navigation, and Timing (PNT)	L1-C/A (L1-C/B), L1C, L5		
Precise Point Positioning (PPP)	L6		
Position Technology Verification Service (PTV)	—	L1Sb, L5S	
L-band antenna type	Patch antenna		
Precise Ranging Payload (PRP)	Inter-satellite ranging (ISR), satellite/ground bi-directional ranging		
Message Communication Payload (MCP)	—		S-band (MCP developed by MELCO)
Secondary Payload	—	SĀCHI	
