= QZS-5 =

Japanese navigation satellite

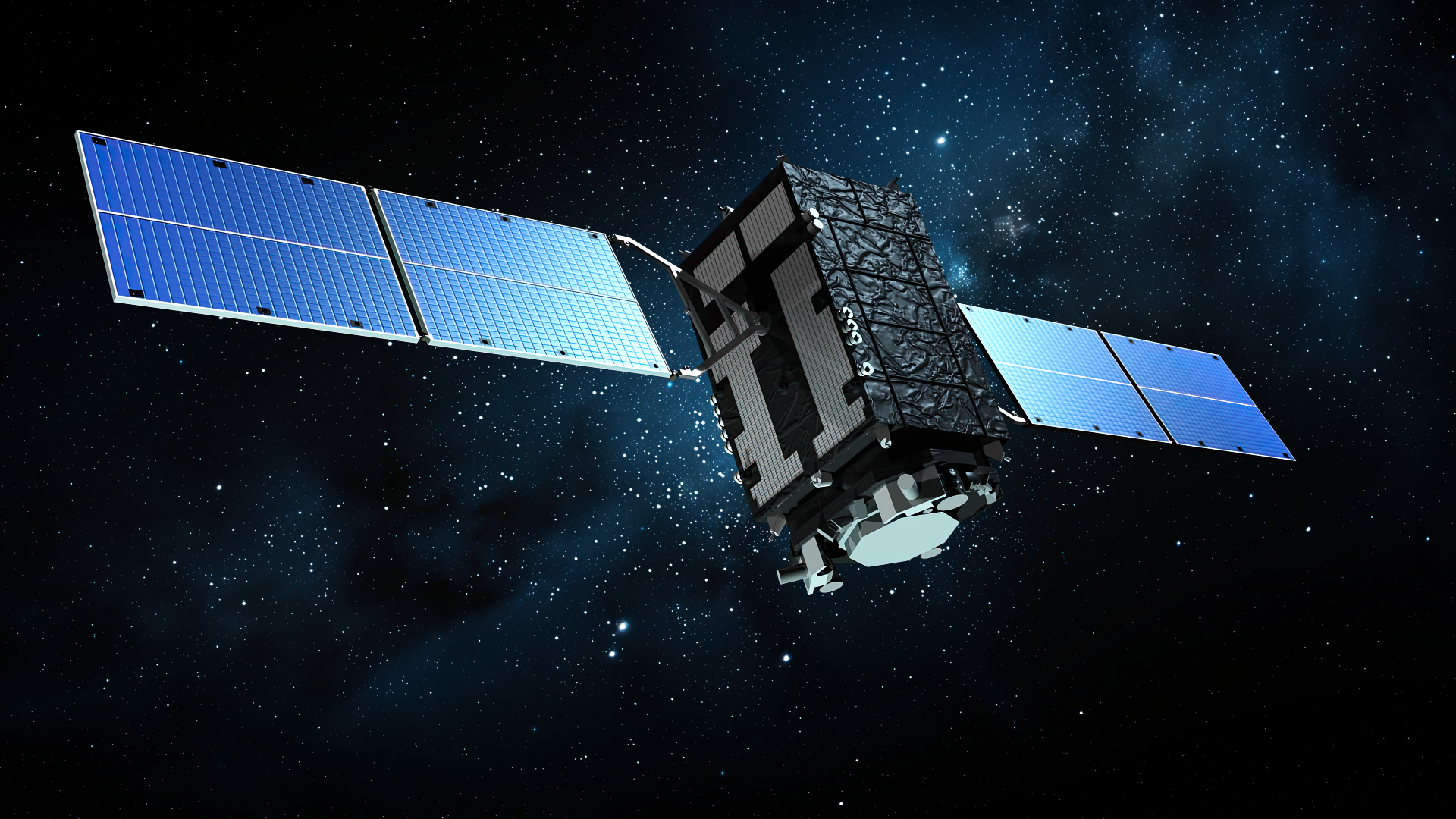
- Artist's rendering of QZS-5 in orbit
- Mission type: Navigation
- Operator: CAO
- Website: https://qzss.go.jp/

Spacecraft properties
- Spacecraft type: QZS Block III-Q
- Bus: DS2000
- Manufacturer: Mitsubishi Electric
- Launch mass: 4.8t
- Dry mass: 2.0t
- Payload mass: 647kg
- Power: 6.7kW

Start of mission
- Launch date: 22 December 2025, 01:51:00 UTC
- Rocket: H3-22S
- Launch site: Tanegashima, LA-Y2
- Contractor: JAXA

Orbital parameters
- Reference system: Geocentric
- Regime: Medium Earth orbit

QZS-5 (Michibiki No.5) was a Japanese navigation satellite lost during launch. It was intended to form part of the Quasi-Zenith Satellite System (QZSS). QZS-5 was to be deployed to a quasi-zenith orbit (QZO).

== Satellite ==
QZS-5 was the second of three Michibiki satellites to be launched to expand QZSS to a seven-satellite constellation. In 2017, Michibiki's four-satellite constellation was established, and with it there are at a minimum two Michibiki satellites (one in QZO and one in GEO) constantly visible from Japan. Satellite navigation requires at least four satellites to be visible, so users need to receive signals from QZSS and other global navigation satellite system (GNSS) at the same time. In its seven-satellite constellation, four Michibiki satellites (one in QZO, two in GEO, and one in quasi-geostationary orbit (QGEO)) will be constantly visible from Japan, thus eliminating the system's dependency on other GNSS. QZS-5 was to join QZS-2 and 4, QZS-1R in Quasi Zenith Orbit.

QZS-5 was manufactured by Mitsubishi Electric (MELCO), and its positioning mission payload was manufactured by NEC. QZS-5 had an intended design life of 15 years. Like QZS-6 and QZS-7, the satellite had a Precise Ranging Payload (PRP) consisting of Inter-satellite ranging (ISR) and satellite/ground bi-directional ranging. PRP enabled the satellite to achieve precise positioning measurement compared to previous Michibiki satellites. The Japan Aerospace Exploration Agency's Advanced Satellite Navigation System (ASNAV) project is responsible for Michibiki's PRP. For ISR, QZS-5 was to be the source of the signals. QZS-6 and QZS-7 were to receive QZS-5's signal to measure the distance between them.

== Launch ==
QZS-5 was launched aboard an H3-22S rocket on 22 December 2025. An anomaly occurred during the second-stage burn that led to a premature engine cutoff and the subsequent loss of the QZS-5 satellite.

== Comparison of QZS-5, 6, and 7 ==
Comparison of QZS-5, 6, and 7
Schematics of satellite	QZS-5	QZS-6	QZS-7
Design life (after launch)	15 years		
Launch date	22 December 2025	2 February 2025	10 August 2026
Orbit	QZO	GEO	QGEO
Rocket	H3-22S		
Mass (dry/launch)	1.8t/4.8t	1.9t/4.9t	2.0t/5.0t
Block type	III-Q	III-G	III-G
Payload electricity consumption	2.4kW	2.7kW	3.0kW
Position, Navigation, and Timing (PNT)	L1-C/A (L1-C/B), L1C, L5		
Precise Point Positioning (PPP)	L6		
Position Technology Verification Service (PTV)	—	L1Sb, L5S	
L-band antenna type	Patch antenna		
Precise Ranging Payload (PRP)	Inter-satellite ranging (ISR), satellite/ground bi-directional ranging		
Message Communication Payload (MCP)	—		S-band (MCP developed by MELCO)
Secondary Payload	—	SĀCHI	
