= Martian orbit =

Martian orbit may refer to:

- the orbit of Mars around the Sun
- an areocentric orbit, orbit of an object around Mars
  - an areostationary orbit
  - an areosynchronous orbit

== See also ==
- Venusian orbit (disambiguation)
- Terrestrial orbit (disambiguation)
