= Terrestrial orbit =

Terrestrial orbit may refer to:

- the orbit of the Earth around the Sun
- a geocentric orbit, orbit of an object around the Earth
  - a geosynchronous orbit
  - a geostationary orbit

== See also ==
- Venusian orbit (disambiguation)
- Martian orbit (disambiguation)
