= Geocentric orbit =

Orbit around Earth

A geocentric orbit, Earth-centered orbit, or Earth orbit involves any object orbiting Earth, such as the Moon or artificial satellites. In 1997, NASA estimated there were approximately 2,465 artificial satellite payloads orbiting Earth and 6,216 pieces of space debris as tracked by the Goddard Space Flight Center. More than 16,291 objects previously launched have undergone orbital decay and entered Earth's atmosphere.

A spacecraft enters orbit when its centripetal acceleration due to gravity is less than or equal to the centrifugal acceleration due to the horizontal component of its velocity. For a low Earth orbit, this velocity is about 7.8 km/s (28,100 km/h; 17,400 mph); by contrast, the fastest crewed airplane speed ever achieved (excluding speeds achieved by deorbiting spacecraft) was 2.2 km/s (7,900 km/h; 4,900 mph) in 1967 by the North American X-15. The energy required to reach Earth orbital velocity at an altitude of 600 km (370 mi) is about 36 MJ/kg, which is six times the energy needed merely to climb to the corresponding altitude.

Spacecraft with a perigee below about 2,000 km (1,200 mi) are subject to drag from the Earth's atmosphere, which decreases the orbital altitude. The rate of orbital decay depends on the satellite's cross-sectional area and mass, as well as variations in the air density of the upper atmosphere. Below about 300 km (190 mi), decay becomes more rapid with lifetimes measured in days. Once a satellite descends to 180 km (110 mi), it has only hours before it vaporizes in the atmosphere. The escape velocity required to pull free of Earth's gravitational field altogether and move into interplanetary space is about 11.2 km/s (40,300 km/h; 25,100 mph).

== List of terms and concepts ==
Altitude
as used here, the height of an object above the average surface of the Earth's oceans (mean sea level).
Analemma
a term in astronomy used to describe the plot of the positions of the Sun on the celestial sphere throughout one year. Closely resembles a figure-eight.
Apogee
is the farthest point that a satellite or celestial body can go from Earth, at which the orbital velocity will be at its minimum.
Eccentricity
a measure of how much an orbit deviates from a perfect circle. Eccentricity is strictly defined for all circular and elliptical orbits, and parabolic and hyperbolic trajectories.
Equatorial plane
as used here, an imaginary plane extending from the equator on the Earth to the celestial sphere.
Escape velocity
as used here, the minimum velocity an object without propulsion needs to have to move away indefinitely from the Earth. An object at this velocity will enter a parabolic trajectory; above this velocity it will enter a hyperbolic trajectory.
Impulse
the integral of a force over the time during which it acts. Measured in (N·sec or lb * sec).
Inclination
the angle between a reference plane and another plane or axis. In the sense discussed here the reference plane is the Earth's equatorial plane.
Orbital arc
an imaginary arc in the sky as seen from any given location on the surface of the Earth.
Orbital characteristics
the six parameters of the Keplerian elements needed to specify that orbit uniquely.
Orbital period
as defined here, time it takes a satellite to make one full orbit around the Earth.
Perigee
is the nearest approach point of a satellite or celestial body from Earth, at which the orbital velocity will be at its maximum.
Sidereal day
the time it takes for a celestial object to rotate 360°. For the Earth this is: 23 hours, 56 minutes, 4.091 seconds.
Solar time
as used here, the local time as measured by a sundial.
Velocity
an object's speed in a particular direction. Since velocity is defined as a vector, both speed and direction are required to define it.

== Types ==
The following is a list of different geocentric orbit classifications.

=== Altitude classifications ===
Low (cyan) and Medium (yellow) Earth orbit regions to scale. The black dashed line is the geosynchronous orbit. The green dashed line is the 20,230 km orbit used for GPS satellites.

Transatmospheric orbit (TAO)
Geocentric orbits with altitudes at apogee higher than 100 km (62 mi) and perigee that intersects with the defined atmosphere.
Low Earth orbit (LEO)
Geocentric orbits ranging in altitude from 160 km (100 mi) to 2,000 km (1,200 mi) above mean sea level. At 160 km, one revolution takes approximately 90 minutes, and the circular orbital speed is 8 km/s (26,000 ft/s).
Medium Earth orbit (MEO)
Geocentric orbits with altitudes at apogee ranging between 2,000 km (1,200 mi) and that of the geosynchronous orbit at 35,786 km (22,236 mi).
Geosynchronous orbit (GSO)
Geocentric circular orbit with an altitude of 35,786 km (22,236 mi). The period of the orbit equals one sidereal day, coinciding with the rotation period of the Earth. The speed is approximately 3 km/s (9,800 ft/s).
High Earth orbit (HEO)
Geocentric orbits with altitudes at apogee higher than that of the geosynchronous orbit. A special case of high Earth orbit is the highly elliptical orbit, where altitude at perigee is less than 2,000 km (1,200 mi).

=== Inclination classifications ===
Inclined orbit
An orbit whose inclination in reference to the equatorial plane is not 0.

Polar orbit
A satellite that passes above or nearly above both poles of the planet on each revolution. Therefore it has an inclination of (or very close to) 90 degrees.
Polar Sun synchronous orbit
A nearly polar orbit that passes the equator at the same local time on every pass. Useful for image-taking satellites because shadows will be the same on every pass.

=== Eccentricity classifications ===
Circular orbit
An orbit that has an eccentricity of 0 and whose path traces a circle.
Elliptic orbit
An orbit with an eccentricity greater than 0 and less than 1 whose orbit traces the path of an ellipse.

Hohmann transfer orbit
An orbital maneuver that moves a spacecraft from one circular orbit to another using two engine impulses. This maneuver was named after Walter Hohmann.
Geosynchronous transfer orbit (GTO)
A geocentric-elliptic orbit where the perigee is at the altitude of a low Earth Orbit (LEO) and the apogee at the altitude of a geosynchronous orbit.
Highly elliptical orbit (HEO)
Geocentric orbit with apogee above 35,786 km and low perigee (about 1,000 km) that result in long dwell times near apogee.

Molniya orbit
A highly elliptical orbit with inclination of 63.4° and orbital period of ½ of a sidereal day (roughly 12 hours). Such a satellite spends most of its time over a designated area of the Earth.
Tundra orbit
A highly elliptical orbit with inclination of 63.4° and orbital period of one sidereal day (roughly 24 hours). Such a satellite spends most of its time over a designated area of the Earth.

Hyperbolic trajectory
An "orbit" with eccentricity greater than 1. The object's velocity reaches some value in excess of the escape velocity, therefore it will escape the gravitational pull of the Earth and continue to travel infinitely with a velocity (relative to Earth) decelerating to some finite value, known as the hyperbolic excess velocity.

Escape Trajectory
This trajectory must be used to launch an interplanetary probe away from Earth, because the excess over escape velocity is what changes its heliocentric orbit from that of Earth.
Capture Trajectory
This is the mirror image of the escape trajectory; an object traveling with sufficient speed, not aimed directly at Earth, will move toward it and accelerate. In the absence of a decelerating engine impulse to put it into orbit, it will follow the escape trajectory after periapsis.

Parabolic trajectory
An "orbit" with eccentricity exactly equal to 1. The object's velocity equals the escape velocity, therefore it will escape the gravitational pull of the Earth and continue to travel with a velocity (relative to Earth) decelerating to 0. A spacecraft launched from Earth with this velocity would travel some distance away from it, but follow it around the Sun in the same heliocentric orbit. It is possible, but not likely that an object approaching Earth could follow a parabolic capture trajectory, but speed and direction would have to be precise.

=== Directional classifications ===
Prograde orbit
an orbit in which the projection of the object onto the equatorial plane revolves about the Earth in the same direction as the rotation of the Earth.
Retrograde orbit
an orbit in which the projection of the object onto the equatorial plane revolves about the Earth in the direction opposite that of the rotation of the Earth.

=== Geosynchronous classifications ===
Semi-synchronous orbit (SSO)
An orbit with an altitude of approximately 20,200 km (12,600 mi) and an orbital period of approximately 12 hours.
Geosynchronous orbit (GEO)
Orbits with an altitude of approximately 35,786 km (22,236 mi). Such a satellite would trace an analemma (figure 8) in the sky.

Geostationary orbit (GSO)
A geosynchronous orbit with an inclination of zero. To an observer on the ground this satellite would appear as a fixed point in the sky.
Clarke orbit
Another name for a geostationary orbit. Named after the writer Arthur C. Clarke.

Earth orbital libration points
The libration points for objects orbiting Earth are at 105 degrees west and 75 degrees east. More than 160 satellites are gathered at these two points.

Supersynchronous orbit
A disposal / storage orbit above GSO/GEO. Satellites will drift west.
Subsynchronous orbit
A drift orbit close to but below GSO/GEO. Satellites will drift east.
Graveyard orbit, disposal orbit, junk orbit
An orbit a few hundred kilometers above geosynchronous that satellites are moved into at the end of their operation.

=== Special classifications ===
Sun-synchronous orbit
An orbit which combines altitude and inclination in such a way that the satellite passes over any given point of the planet's surface at the same local solar time. Such an orbit can place a satellite in constant sunlight and is useful for imaging, spy, and weather satellites.
Moon orbit
The orbital characteristics of Earth's Moon. Average altitude of 384,403 kilometres (238,857 mi), elliptical–inclined orbit.

=== Non-geocentric classifications ===
Horseshoe orbit
An orbit that appears to a ground observer to be orbiting a planet but is actually in co-orbit with it. See asteroids 3753 (Cruithne) and 2002 AA_{29}.
Sub-orbital flight
A launch where a spacecraft approaches the height of orbit but lacks the velocity to sustain it.

== Tangential velocities at altitude ==
| Orbit | Center-to-center distance | Altitude above the Earth's surface | Speed | Orbital period | Specific orbital energy |
|---|---|---|---|---|---|
| Earth's own rotation at surface on the equator (for comparison; not an orbit) | 6,378 km | 0 km | 465.1 m/s (1,674 km/h or 1,040 mph) | 23 h 56 min 4.09 sec | −62.6 MJ/kg |
| Orbiting at Earth's surface (equator) theoretical | 6,378 km | 0 km | 7.9 km/s (28,440 km/h or 17,672 mph) | 1 h 24 min 18 sec | −31.2 MJ/kg |
| Low Earth orbit | 6,600 – 8,400 km | 200 – 2,000 km | Circular orbit: 7.7–6.9 km/s (27,720–24,840 km/h or 17,224–15,435 mph) respectively; Elliptic: 10.07–8.7 km/s respectively | 1 h 29 min – 2 h 8 min | −29.8 MJ/kg |
| Molniya orbit | 6,900 – 46,300 km | 500 – 39,900 km | 1.5–10.0 km/s (5,400–36,000 km/h or 3,335–22,370 mph) respectively | 11 h 58 min | −4.7 MJ/kg |
| Geostationary | 42,000 km | 35,786 km | 3.075 km/s (11,070 km/h or 6,879 mph) | 23 h 56 min 4.09 sec | −4.6 MJ/kg |
| Orbit of the Moon | 363,000 – 406,000 km | 357,000 – 399,000 km | 0.97–1.08 km/s (3,492–3,888 km/h or 2,170–2,416 mph) respectively | 27.27 days | −0.5 MJ/kg |

The lower axis gives orbital speeds of some orbits.

== See also ==
- Earth's orbit
- List of orbits
- Orbital mechanics
- Celestial sphere
- Heliocentric orbit
- Areosynchronous orbit
- Areostationary orbit
- Escape velocity
- Satellite
- Satellite watching
- Space station
