= Stationary orbit =

In celestial mechanics, a stationary orbit is an orbit around a planet or moon where the orbiting satellite or spacecraft remains over the same spot on the surface. From the ground, the satellite would appear to be standing still, hovering above the surface in the same spot, day after day.

In practice, this is accomplished by matching the rotation of the surface below, by reaching a particular altitude where the orbital speed almost matches the rotation below, in an equatorial orbit. As the speed decreases slowly, then an additional boost would be needed to increase the speed back to a matching speed, or a retro-rocket could be fired to slow the speed when too fast.

The stationary-orbit region of space is known as the Clarke Belt, named after British science fiction writer Arthur C. Clarke, who published the idea in Wireless World magazine in 1945. A stationary orbit is sometimes referred to as a "fixed orbit".

== Stationary Earth orbit ==
An example of geostationary orbit, where the satellite (green) always stays above the same spot (brown).

Around the Earth, stationary satellites orbit at altitudes of approximately 22,300 miles (35,900 km). Writing in 1945, the science-fiction author Arthur C. Clarke imagined communications satellites as travelling in stationary orbits, where those satellites would travel around the Earth at the same speed the globe is spinning, making them hover stationary over one spot on the Earth's surface.

A satellite being propelled into place, into a stationary orbit, is first fired to a special equatorial orbit called a "geostationary transfer orbit" (GTO). Within this oval-shaped (elliptical) orbit, the satellite will alternately swing out to 22,300 miles (35,890 km) high and then back down to an altitude of only 100 miles (160 km) above the Earth (223 times closer). Then, at a planned time and place, an attached "kick motor" will push the satellite out to maintain an even, circular orbit at the 22,300-mile altitude.

== Stationary Mars orbit ==
An areostationary orbit or areosynchronous equatorial orbit (abbreviated AEO) is a circular areosynchronous orbit in the Martian equatorial plane about 20,428 km (12,693 mi) from the centre of mass of Mars, any point on which revolves about Mars in the same direction and with the same period as the Martian surface. Areostationary orbit is a concept similar to Earth's geostationary orbit. The prefix areo- derives from Ares, the ancient Greek god of war and counterpart to the Roman god Mars, with whom the planet was identified. The modern Greek word for Mars is Άρης (Áris).

== See also ==
- Lagrangian point
- Cytherocentric orbit
