= Quasi-Zenith Satellite System =

Japanese regional navigation satellite system

- Country/ies of origin: Japan
- Operator: Quasi-Zenith Satellite System Services Inc. / Cabinet Office
- Type: Civilian
- Status: Operational
- Coverage: Regional
- Accuracy: PNT: <10 m (33 ft); SLAS: <1 m (3 ft 3 in); CLAS: <10 cm (3.9 in)

Constellation size
- Nominal satellites: 7
- Current usable satellites: 5
- First launch: 11 September 2010
- Last launch: 2 February 2025
- Total launches: 6

Orbital characteristics
- Regime(s): GEO (2 × GSO, 3 × QZO)

Other details
- Cost: ¥160 billion
- Website: qzss.go.jp/en/

The Quasi-Zenith Satellite System (QZSS) (Japanese: 準天頂衛星システム, Hepburn: juntenchō eisei shisutemu), also known as Michibiki (みちびき, "guidance"), is a regional navigation satellite system (RNSS) and a satellite-based augmentation system (SBAS) developed by the Japanese government to enhance the United States-operated Global Positioning System (GPS) in the Asia-Oceania regions, with a focus on Japan. The goal of QZSS is to provide highly precise and stable positioning services in the Asia-Oceania region, compatible with GPS. Four-satellite QZSS services were available on a trial basis as of 12 January 2018, and officially started on 1 November 2018. A satellite navigation system independent of GPS is planned for 2023 with seven satellites. In May 2023 it was announced that the system would expand to eleven satellites.

== History ==
In 2002, the Japanese government authorized the development of QZSS, as a three-satellite regional time transfer system and a satellite-based augmentation system (SBAS) for the United States operated Global Positioning System (GPS) to be receivable within Japan. A contract was awarded to Advanced Space Business Corporation (ASBC), that began concept development work, and Mitsubishi Electric, Hitachi, and GNSS Technologies Inc. However, ASBC collapsed in 2007, and the work was taken over by the Satellite Positioning Research and Application Center (SPAC), which is owned by four Japanese government departments: the Ministry of Education, Culture, Sports, Science and Technology, the Ministry of Internal Affairs and Communications, the Ministry of Economy, Trade and Industry, and the Ministry of Land, Infrastructure, Transport and Tourism.

The first satellite "Michibiki" was launched on 11 September 2010. Full operational status was expected by 2013. In March 2013, Japan's Cabinet Office announced the expansion of QZSS from three satellites to four. The US$526 million contract with Mitsubishi Electric for the construction of three satellites was scheduled for launch before the end of 2017. The third satellite was launched into orbit on 19 August 2017, and the fourth was launched on 10 October 2017. The basic four-satellite system was announced as operational on 1 November 2018. The sixth satellite failed to reach its orbit on 22 December 2025.

As of 2024, an eleven-satellite configuration was planned for the late 2030s, which would provide redundancy for single-satellite failure.

== Orbit ==
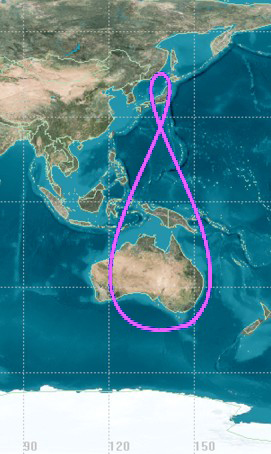
Quasi-Zenith satellite orbit

QZSS animation, the "Quasi-Zenith/tundra orbit" plot is clearly visible.

QZSS uses two geostationary satellites and three satellites in Tundra-type highly inclined, slightly elliptical, geosynchronous orbits. Each orbit is 120° apart from the other two. Because of this inclination, they are not geostationary; they do not remain in the same place in the sky. Instead, their ground traces are asymmetrical figure-8 patterns (analemmas), designed to ensure that one is almost directly overhead (elevation 60° or more) over Japan at all times.

The nominal orbital elements are:

QZSS satellite Keplerian elements (nominal)
| Epoch | 26 December 2009, 12:00 UTC |
| Semimajor axis (a) | 42,164 km (26,199 mi) |
| Eccentricity (e) | 0.075 ± 0.015 |
| Inclination (i) | 43° ± 4° |
| Right ascension of the ascending node (Ω) | 195° (initial) |
| Argument of perigee (ω) | 270° ± 2° |
| Mean anomaly (M_{0}) | 305° (initial) |
| Central longitude of ground trace | 135° E ± 5° |

A planned seven-satellite constellation would consist of four Quasi-Zenith Orbit (QZO) satellites, two geostationary (GEO) satellites, and one quasi-geostationary (slight incline and eccentricity) orbit satellite. Ground trace of QZS-1 and -1R are positioned around 148° E. QZS-2, -4, -5 are around 139° E.

As of 2025, an eleven-satellite configuration is under consideration. It would add two QZO satellites around 90°E longitude and two QZO satellites around 190°E longitude.

== Satellites ==
| Name | Launch date | Launch Vehicle | Status | Notes |
|---|---|---|---|---|
| QZS-1 | 11 September 2010 | H-IIA 202 | Retired | Experimental. Lacked MADOCA and PTV signals. Replaced by QZS-1R and retired on 15 September 2023. |
| QZS-2 | 1 June 2017 | H-IIA 202 | Operational | Improved solar panels and increased fuel |
| QZS-3 | 19 August 2017 | H-IIA 204 | Operational | Heavier design with additional S-band antenna on geostationary orbit at 127° E |
| QZS-4 | 10 October 2017 | H-IIA 202 | Operational | Improved solar panels and increased fuel |
| QZS-1R | 26 October 2021 | H-IIA 202 | Operational | Replacement for QZS-1. |
| QZS-5 | 22 December 2025 | H3-22S | Lost | Launch vehicle malfunction. |
| QZS-6 | 2 February 2025 | H3-22S | Operational | Geostationary at 90.5° E |
| QZS-7 | 11 August 2026 (JST) | H3-22S | Operational | Quasi-geostationary around 185° E |

For a list of pseudorandom noise codes (PRN#) and space vehicle numbers (SVN), see official documentation.

Animation of QZSS

Around the Earth - Oblique view

Around the Earth - Polar view

Earth fixed frame - Equatorial view, front

Earth fixed frame - Equatorial view, side

Earth · QZS-1 · QZS-2 · QZS-3 · QZS-4

== Timekeeping and remote synchronization ==
According to its original plan, QZSS was to carry two types of space-borne atomic clocks; a hydrogen maser and a rubidium (Rb) atomic clock. The development of a passive hydrogen maser for QZSS was abandoned in 2006. The positioning signal will be generated by a Rb clock and an architecture similar to the GPS timekeeping system will be employed. QZSS will also be able to use a Two-Way Satellite Time and Frequency Transfer (TWSTFT) scheme, which will be employed to gain some fundamental knowledge of satellite atomic standard behavior in space as well as for other research purposes.

Although the first generation QZSS timekeeping system (TKS) will be based on the Rb clock, the first QZSS satellites will carry a basic prototype of an experimental crystal clock synchronization system. During the first half of the two-year in-orbit test phase, preliminary tests will investigate the feasibility of the atomic clock-less technology which might be employed in the second generation QZSS.

The mentioned QZSS TKS technology is a novel satellite timekeeping system which does not require on-board atomic clocks as used by existing navigation satellite systems such as BeiDou, Galileo, Global Positioning System (GPS), GLONASS or NavIC system. This concept is differentiated by the employment of a synchronization framework combined with lightweight steerable on-board clocks which act as transponders re-broadcasting the precise time remotely provided by the time synchronization network located on the ground. This allows the system to operate optimally when satellites are in direct contact with the ground station, making it suitable for a system like the Japanese QZSS. Low satellite mass and low satellite manufacturing and launch cost are significant advantages of this system. An outline of this concept as well as two possible implementations of the time synchronization network for QZSS were studied and published in Remote Synchronization Method for the Quasi-Zenith Satellite System and Remote Synchronization Method for the Quasi-Zenith Satellite System: study of a novel satellite timekeeping system which does not require on-board atomic clocks.

== Positioning augmentation ==
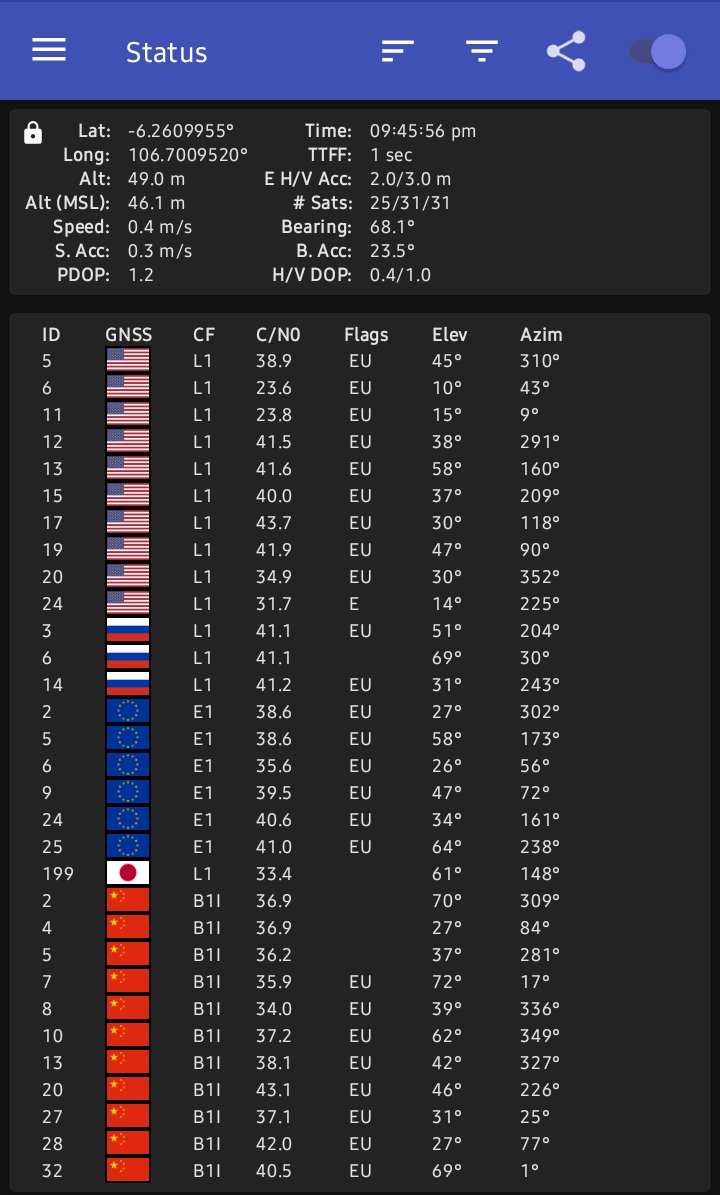
Screenshot of GPSTest application showing a QZSS satellite and other GNSS satellites usage in South Tangerang, Indonesia (2025)

The primary purpose of QZSS is to increase the availability of GPS in Japan's numerous urban canyons, where only satellites at very high elevation can be seen. A secondary function is performance enhancement, increasing the accuracy and reliability of GPS-derived navigation solutions. The Quasi-Zenith Satellites transmit signals compatible with the GPS L1C/A signal, as well as the modernized GPS L1C, L2C signal and L5 signals. This minimizes changes to existing GPS receivers.

Compared to standalone GPS, the combined system GPS plus QZSS delivers improved positioning performance via ranging correction data provided through the transmission of submeter-class performance enhancement signals L1S, L6D, and L6E from QZSS. It also improves reliability by means of failure monitoring and system health data notifications. QZSS also provides other support data to users to improve GPS satellite acquisition.

=== Signals and services ===
The QZSS provides the following classes of public service:

- The PNT (positioning, navigation, and timing) service complements the signals used by the GPS, essentially acting as extra satellites. The QZSS satellites sync their clocks with GPS satellites. The service broadcasts at frequency bands L1C/A, L1C, L2C, and L5, the same as GPS, with largely interoperable formats. The L1C and L2C messages include time differences from GPS, GLONASS, and Beidou to allow simultaneous use of multiple satnav systems.
  - Two ionospheric parameter sets are provided, one for a rectangular area enclosing Japan, the other for a larger area.
  - Block III satellites broadcast L1C/B instead of L1C/A, which differs from L1C/A by the addition of a square wave subcarrier modulation.
- The SLAS (sub-meter level augmentation service) provides a form of GNSS augmentation for GPS interoperable with other GPS-SBAS system. It transmits on L1 and is called L1S. It contains differential GPS data in the form of pseudorange errors at monitoring stations. It augments multiple constellations.
- The Michibiki Satellite-based Augmentation Service (MSAS), transmitting on L1 as L1Sb. EGNOS-like state-space data structure.
- The CLAS (centimeter level augmentation service) provides high-precision positioning compatible with the high-accuracy service (HAS, E6) of Galileo. The band is referred to as L6 and the signal is known as L62. The message type is L6D. It contains state-space correction for multiple constellations, availability information for SBAS, and ionospheric and tropospheric correction data.
- The MADOCA-PPP (Multi-GNSS Advanced Orbit and Clock Augmentation – Precise Point Positioning) service is an augmentation service independent from CLAS. It also broadcasts on L6 but uses a different modulation known as L6E. It augments multiple constellations. It transmits data about GNSS orbit/clock correction, satellite code/phase bias, and GNSS accuracy.
  - An ongoing experiment transmits wide-area ionospheric correction data on L6D in place of CLAS on select satellites. The ionospheric correction data is defined for specific rectangular or circular regions in Asia and Oceania, with their definitions also broadcast by the satellites.
- The DC Report (Satellite Report for Disaster and Crisis Management) service broadcasts on L1S and provides information on natural disasters such as floods and earthquakes and other safety-critical information such as missile launches. It is incorporated into SLAS data.
- The QZSS Signal Authentication Services (SAS), which provides cryptographic signatures to prevent (or rather, detect) GNSS spoofing and other signal spoofing.
  - Navigation Message Authentication (NMA) which specifically protects PNT signals.
    - QZSS NMA, which transmits the signature along with the PNT signals on their respective bands and modulations.
    - GPS and Galileo NMA, which transmits the signatures on the L6E signal in a time-divided manner with MADOCA-PPP.

The other classes of service are not publicly available:

- The PTV (Positioning Technology Verification) service broadcasts on L5S. The documentation only describes a "null" message type.
- The Q-ANPI (QZSS Safety Confirmation Service) is an authorized short message service. It is not seen on the website as of 2026.

Unless otherwise stated, "multiple constellations" refers to GPS, GLONASS, Galileo, QZSS, and BeiDou.

=== Coverage ===
QZSS coverage can be divided into two topics: the visibility of the satellite and the applicability of the augmentation data. Every user with a view of the satellite can make use of PNT navigation messages, the location-independent elements of augmentation messages (satellite orbit and clock corrections), and the message authentication service. Only users near or in the intended areas can make effective use of the location-dependent elements of augmentation messages (ionospheric correction, local accuracy estimate) and other services such as natural disaster alerts.

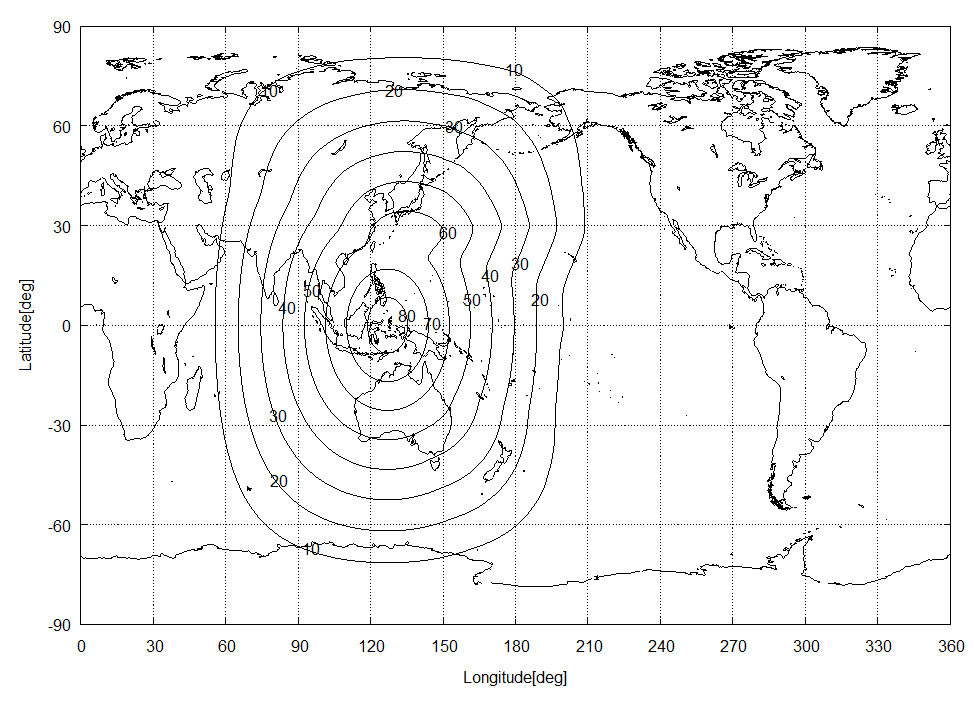
Ground visibility and elevation of QZS-3

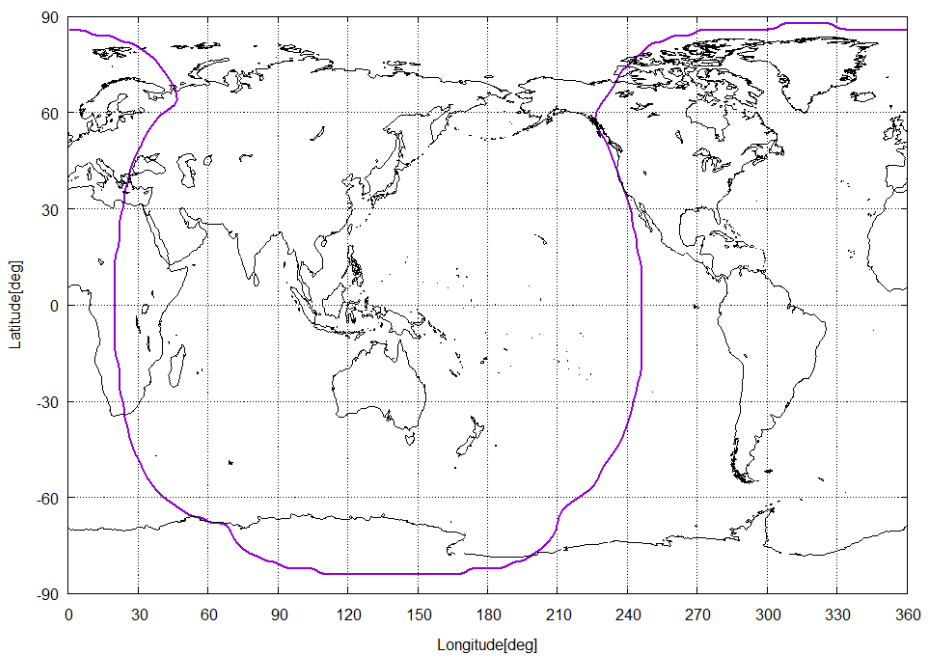
Areas with uninterrupted visibility of at least one QZO satellite (QZS-1R/2/4) at an elevation of at least 10°, assuming the full 7-satellite constellation

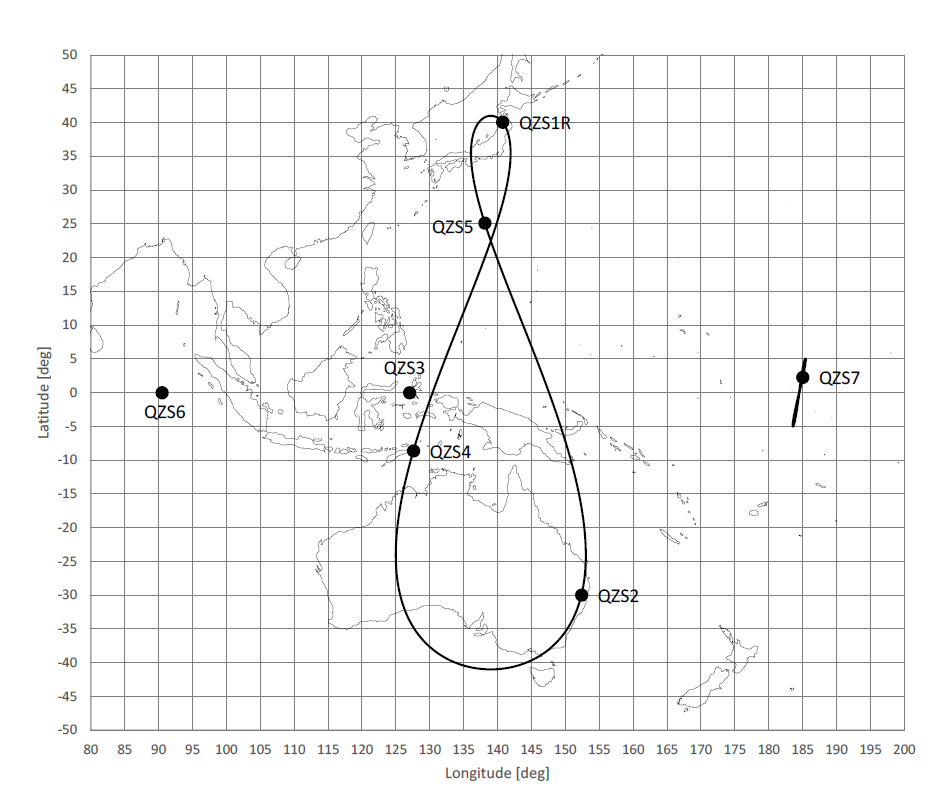
Typical ground track of planned 7-satellite constellation
- The ionospheric parameters from PNT is defined for a "Japan area" (50°N–22°N, 110°E–160°E) and a "broad area" (60°N–60°S, 60°E–160°W) respectively.
- The SLAS service area can be found in the article Michibiki Satellite-based Augmentation Service (MSAS). As of October 2025 it achieves LPV200 over the home islands, the Korean peninsula, the Ryukyu island chain, and Bonin Islands. It achieves LPV250 over Taiwan on days of normal ionospheric activity, but is unable to during intense ionospheric activity. The FY 2025 assessment report uses the 13 MSAS base stations for testing and produces essentially the same coverage.
- The CLAS service has essentially the service area as SLAS. The ionospheric and tropospheric corrections are transmitted as gridded data covering these areas.
- The FY2025 MADOCA-PPP performance report shows a large intended service area ranging from 60°N–60°S, 60°E–160°W. With that said, it broadcasts no location-dependent information.
- MADOCA-PPP experimental ionospheric correction covers Japanese home islands, Ryukyu island chain, Bonin Islands, the Philippines, Australia, and a small area around Jakarta.
- The DC Report (DCR) service is managed by the Japan Meteorological Agency which publishes reports about events affecting Japan. The DCR also includes tsunamis and earthquakes affecting the northwest Pacific Ocean. The Extended DC Report (DCX) service is intended to also be used by international disaster prevention organizations.

== Public outreach ==
In January 2025, VTuber Clear Usui was appointed ambassador of QZSS. She promoted the satellite system with livestreams and illustrations.

Comparison of Tundra orbit, QZSS orbit and Molniya orbit - equatorial view

Front view

Side view

Earth fixed frame, Front view

Earth fixed frame, Side view

Tundra orbit · QZSS orbit · Molniya orbit · Earth

== See also ==
- Multi-functional Satellite Augmentation System (MSAS)
- Inclined orbit
- Tundra orbit

=== Other systems ===
- BeiDou – global navigation satellite system operated by China.
- Galileo – global navigation satellite system operated by the European Union.
- GLONASS – global navigation satellite system operated by Russia.
- GPS – global navigation satellite system operated by the United States.
- NavIC – regional navigation satellite system operated by India, receivable in the South Asia and Western Asia regions.
