= Synchronous orbit =

Orbit of an astronomical body equal to that body's average rotational period

A synchronous orbit is an orbit in which an orbiting body (usually a satellite) has a period equal to the average rotational period of the body being orbited (usually a planet), and in the same direction of rotation as that body.

== Simplified meaning ==
A synchronous orbit is an orbit in which the orbiting object (for example, an artificial satellite or a moon) takes the same amount of time to complete an orbit as it takes the object it is orbiting to rotate once.

== Properties ==
A satellite in a synchronous orbit that is both equatorial and circular will appear to be suspended motionless above a point on the orbited planet's equator. For synchronous satellites orbiting Earth, this is also known as a geostationary orbit. However, a synchronous orbit need not be equatorial; nor circular. A body in a non-equatorial synchronous orbit will appear to oscillate north and south above a point on the planet's equator, whereas a body in an elliptical orbit will appear to oscillate eastward and westward. As seen from the orbited body the combination of these two motions produces a figure-8 pattern called an analemma.

== Nomenclature ==
There are many specialized terms for synchronous orbits depending on the body orbited. The following are some of the more common ones. A synchronous orbit around Earth that is circular and lies in the equatorial plane is called a geostationary orbit. The more general case, when the orbit is inclined to Earth's equator or is non-circular is called a geosynchronous orbit. The corresponding terms for synchronous orbits around Mars are areostationary and areosynchronous orbits.

== Formula ==
For a stationary synchronous orbit:

$$R_{syn} = \sqrt[3]{{G(m_2)T^2\over 4 \pi^2}}$$
where:

- $G$ is the gravitational constant
- $m_2$ is the mass of the celestial body
- $T$ is the sidereal rotational period of the body
- $R_{syn}$ is the radius of orbit

By this formula, one can find the synchronous orbital radius of a body, given its mass and sidereal rotational period.

Orbital speed (how fast a satellite is moving through space) is calculated by multiplying the angular speed of the satellite by the orbital radius.

Due to obscure quirks of orbital mechanics, no tidally locked body in a 1:1 spin-orbit resonance (i.e. a moon locked to a planet or a planet locked to a star) can have a stable satellite in a synchronous orbit, as the synchronous orbital radius lies outside the body's Hill sphere. This is universal and irrespective of the masses and distances involved.

== Examples ==
An astronomical example is Pluto's largest moon Charon. Much more commonly, synchronous orbits are employed by artificial satellites used for communication, such as geostationary satellites.

For natural satellites, which can attain a synchronous orbit only by tidally locking their parent body, it always goes in hand with synchronous rotation of the satellite. This is because the smaller body becomes tidally locked faster, and by the time a synchronous orbit is achieved, it has had a locked synchronous rotation for a long time already.

The following table lists select Solar System bodies' masses, sidereal rotational periods, and the semi-major axes and altitudes of their synchronous orbital radii (calculated by the formula in the above section):

Body	Body's Mass (kg)	Sidereal Rotation period	Semi-major axis of synchronous orbit (km)	Altitude of synchronous orbit (km)	Synchronous orbit within Hill sphere?
Mercury	0.33010×10^{24}	1407.6 h	242,895 km	240,454 km	No
Venus	4.8673×10^{24}	5832.6 h	1,536,578 km	1,530,526 km	No
Earth	5.9722×10^{24}	23.9345 h	42,164 km	35,786 km	Yes
Moon	0.07346×10^{24}	655.72 h	88,453 km	86,715 km	No
Mars	0.64169×10^{24}	24.6229 h	20,428 km	17,031 km	Yes
Ceres	0.09393×10^{22}	9.074 h	1,192 km	723 km	Yes
Jupiter	1898.13×10^{24}	9.925 h	169,010 km	88,518 km	Yes
Saturn	568.32×10^{24}	10.656 h	112,239 km	51,971 km	Yes
Uranus	86.811×10^{24}	17.24 h	82,686 km	57,127 km	Yes
Neptune	102.409×10^{24}	16.11 h	83,508 km	58,744 km	Yes
Pluto	0.01303×10^{24}	153.2928 h	18,860 km	17,672 km	Yes

== See also ==
- Subsynchronous orbit
- Semisynchronous orbit
- Supersynchronous orbit
- Graveyard orbit
- Tidal locking (synchronous rotation)
- Sun-synchronous orbit
- List of orbits
