= Supersynchronous orbit =

Kind of planetary orbit

A supersynchronous orbit is an orbit with a period greater than that of a synchronous orbit, or an orbit whose major axis is larger than that of a synchronous orbit. A synchronous orbit has a period equal to the rotational period of the body which contains the barycenter of the orbit.

== Geocentric supersynchronous orbits ==
One particular supersynchronous orbital regime of significant economic value to Earth commerce is a band of near-circular Geocentric orbits beyond the geosynchronous belt—with perigee altitude above 36,100 kilometres (22,400 mi), approximately 300 kilometres (190 mi) above synchronous altitude —called the geo graveyard belt.

The geo graveyard belt orbital regime is valuable as a storage and disposal location for derelict satellite space debris after their useful economic life is completed as geosynchronous communication satellites. Artificial satellites are left in space because the economic cost of removing the debris would be high, and current public policy does not require nor incentivize rapid removal by the party that first inserted the debris in outer space and thus created a negative externality for others—a placing of the cost onto them. One public policy proposal to deal with growing space debris is a "one-up/one-down" launch license policy for Earth orbits. Launch vehicle operators would have to pay the cost of debris mitigation. They would need to build the capability into their launch vehicle – robotic capture, navigation, mission duration extension, and substantial additional propellant – to be able to rendezvous with, capture and deorbit an existing derelict satellite from approximately the same orbital plane.

An additional common use of supersynchronous orbits are for the launch and transfer orbit trajectory of new commsats intended for geosynchronous orbits. In this approach, the launch vehicle places the satellite into a supersynchronous elliptical transfer orbit, an orbit with a somewhat larger apogee than the more typical geostationary transfer orbit (GTO) typically used for communication satellites. Such an orbit is used because a small change in inclination at a lower altitude requires much more energy than the same change at a higher altitude. Thus is it sometimes optimal to use spacecraft propulsion to change the inclination at a higher-than-desired apogee, then lower the apogee to the desired altitude—resulting in a lower total expenditure of propellant by the satellite's kick motor.

This technique was used, for example, on the launch and transfer orbit injection of the first two SpaceX Falcon 9 v1.1 GTO launches in December 2013 and January 2014, SES-8 and Thaicom 6 (90,000 kilometers (56,000 mi)-apogee), respectively. In both cases, the satellite owner uses the propulsion built into the satellite to reduce the apogee and circularize the orbit to a geostationary orbit. This has also been a common practice by ULA, including the WGS communications satellite constellation. This technique was also used on the launch of SES-14 and Al Yah 3 during Ariane 5 flight VA241. However, due to launch crew error resulting in anomaly and a deviation of the trajectory, the satellites were not inserted into the intended orbit, causing a reschedule of their maneuvering plan.

== Non-Geocentric supersynchronous orbits ==
The Martian moons Phobos and Deimos are in subsynchronous and supersynchronous orbits respectively. Phobos is orbiting Mars faster than the rotation of Mars itself.

Most natural satellites in the Solar System are in supersynchronous orbits. The Moon is in a supersynchronous orbit of Earth, orbiting more slowly than the 24-hour rotational period of Earth. The inner of the two Martian moons, Phobos, is in a subsynchronous orbit of Mars with an orbital period of only 0.32 days. The outer moon Deimos is in supersynchronous orbit around Mars.

The Mars Orbiter Mission—currently orbiting Mars—is placed into highly elliptical supersynchronous orbit around Mars, with a period of 76.7 hours and a planned periapsis of 365 km (227 mi) and apoapsis of 70,000 km (43,000 mi).

== See also ==
- Subsynchronous orbit
- List of orbits
