= Venusian orbit =

Venusian orbit may refer to:

- the orbit of Venus around the Sun
- a cytherocentric orbit, orbit of an object around Venus

== See also ==
- Terrestrial orbit (disambiguation)
- Martian orbit (disambiguation)
