= Clear Usui =

VTuber

- Occupation: Virtual YouTuber

YouTube information
- Channel: 宇推くりあ -★Clear Usui Rocket ch.★-
- Years active: 2020–present
- Genres: science communication, singing
- Website: clearusui.com

Clear Usui (宇推くりあ, Usui Kuria) is a Japanese virtual YouTuber who commentates on rocket launches. She has collaborated with JAXA and other organizations to promote space programs.

== Overview ==
In her fictional lore as a VTuber, Usui is an alien who came to Earth because of Love Live!. She set her birthday as 7 July 2020, the day she crash-landed her rocket.

Usui has silver hair and wears a teal dress with rocket motifs. She created her design and Live2D model. She used a 3D model from the avatar software V-Katsu before it ended service in 2022, and debuted a 3D model from Sanrio in 2026.

== Activity ==
Usui debuted on 10 October 2020 and is a "rocket idol VTuber" who mainly livestreams rocket launch watchalongs and also sings. She said that she had been interested in space from a young age, admired the characters of Love Live!, and became a VTuber to pursue both interests. In 2021, she won the fan-voted Best Fashion Award on Nippon Television's Project V VTuber Awards 2021 for her outfit.

Usui gained attention in February 2023 for her detailed explanation of the aborted first launch attempt of the first H3 test rocket, and in March 2023 for her call to support JAXA after the failed second launch attempt. In July 2023, she was briefly interviewed by and provided footage to local media after livestreaming the explosion of an Epsilon S rocket engine during test firing.

In 2025, Usui won a popularity contest on Sanrio's content creation platform Charaforio, and received a 3D model and performance at Sanrio Virtual Festival 2026.

== Collaborations ==
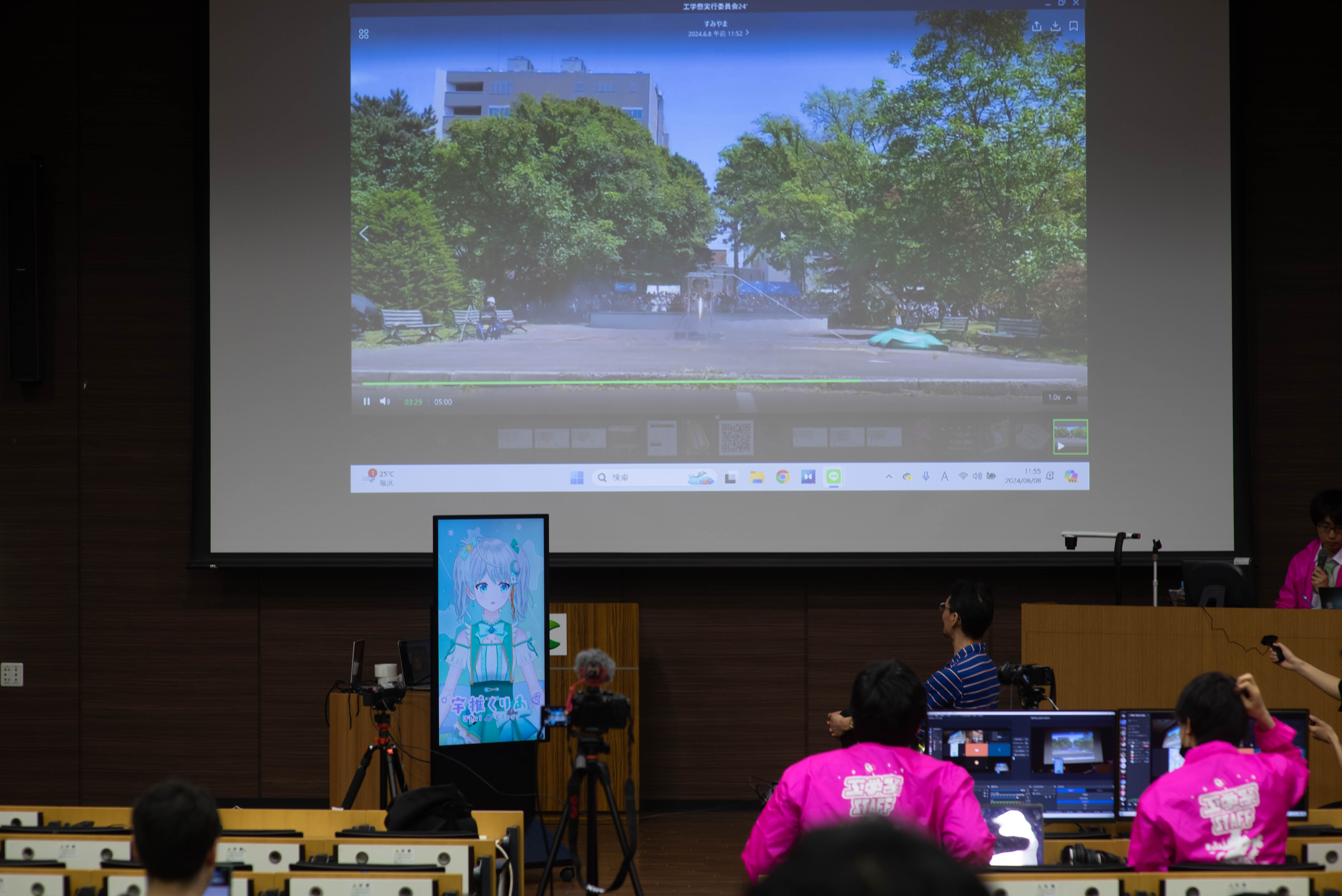
Hokkaido University festival event "Combustion with Clear Usui! ★Test Firing Live Broadcast★"

In October 2023, Usui became the public relations ambassador for the Cabinet Office's 6th Space Development and Utilization Awards, appearing on promotional posters. She also collaborated with satellite program EarthCARE in 2024 and became the ambassador for satellite navigation system Michibiki in 2025. She appeared in space outreach events, including a JAXA open campus and ISS/KIBO Utilization Symposium 2024 and 2025. In 2026, as part of Oshisora Project, she performed in a space concert after her plushie and acrylic panel were sent to ISS/KIBO. She participated in a collaboration between JAXA and Liella! of Love Live! Superstar!!.

Usui has written articles for astronomical magazine Hoshinavi on lunar program HAKUTO-R and space telescope XRISM. She has also interviewed people in the space industry such as Takafumi Horie.

She was a sponsor of the first and second H3 test rockets, and of miniature Lunar rover SORA-Q.
