= QZS-1R =

Japanese navigation satellite

- Names: QZS-1 Replacement; Michibiki-1R
- Mission type: Navigation
- Operator: Cabinet Office (Japan) (CAO)
- COSPAR ID: 2021-096A
- SATCAT no.: 49336
- Website: https://qzss.go.jp/
- Mission duration: 5 years and 22 days (in progress)

Spacecraft properties
- Bus: DS2000
- Manufacturer: Mitsubishi Electric
- Launch mass: 4,100 kg (9,000 lb)
- Dimensions: 5.4 × 2.9 × 2.9 m (17.7 × 9.5 × 9.5 ft)
- Power: 6.3 kW

Start of mission
- Launch date: 26 October 2021, 02:19:37 UTC
- Rocket: H-IIA 202 (F-44)
- Launch site: Tanegashima, Yoshinobu LA-Y1
- Contractor: Mitsubishi Heavy Industries

Orbital parameters
- Reference system: Geocentric orbit
- Regime: Medium Earth orbit
- Perigee altitude: 32,627.7 km
- Apogee altitude: 38,956.6 km
- Inclination: 37.3°
- Period: 1,436 minutes

QZS-1R is a Japanese navigation satellite consisting part of the Quasi-Zenith Satellite System (QZSS). QZS-1R replaced the QZS-1 (Michibiki-1) satellite launched in September 2010. Launched on 26 October 2021 aboard an H-IIA rocket, it is part of Japan's Quasi-Zenith Satellite System (QZSS). The satellite provides positioning and high-precision positioning augmentation services. It entered operational service on 24 March 2022 and has improved durability, with a design life extended by approximately five years compared with its predecessor.

== Satellite ==
QZS-1R is the fourth operational Quasi-Zenith Satellite to be launched. The design of the satellite is based on QZS-2 and 4, with minor differences such as an increase in the number of temperature sensors on board. QZS-1 had a design life of ten years. As QZS-1 was an experimental satellite, it did not broadcast the MADOCA (Multi-GNSS Advanced Demonstration tool for Orbit and Clock Analysis) signal, which can be used for centimeter-order navigation. With the launch of QZS-1R, all satellites of QZSS are capable of transmitting in the MADOCA signal, reaching operational capacity.

== Launch ==
QZS-1R was launched on 26 October 2021 by Mitsubishi Heavy Industries. After launch, Mitsubishi completed the initial verification of the satellite's equipment, and the Cabinet Office began providing positioning services through QZS-1R on 24 March 2022, after Quasi-Zenith Satellite System Services Inc. completed testing of the related ground systems. Compared with the first Michibiki satellite, QZS-1R has improved durability, which was expected to extend its design life by about five years, to more than 15 years. The satellite has a dry mass of about 1.6 tons, a launch mass of about 4.0 tons and a wingspan of about 19 m. Together with QZS-2, 3 and 4, all launched in 2017, it supports positioning, high-precision positioning augmentation and other satellite services. After the replacement entered service, QZS-1 was retired and re-orbited.
