= List of orbits =

Comparison of geostationary Earth orbit with GPS, GLONASS, Galileo and Compass (medium Earth orbit) satellite navigation system orbits with the International Space Station, Hubble Space Telescope and Iridium constellation orbits, and the nominal size of the Earth. (Note: Orbital periods and speeds are calculated using the relations 4π^{2}R^{3} = T^{2}GM and V^{2}R = GM, where R = radius of orbit in metres, T = orbital period in seconds, V = orbital speed in m/s, G = gravitational constant ≈ 6.673×10^{−11} Nm^{2}/kg^{2}, M = mass of Earth ≈ 5.98×10^{24} kg.) The Moon's orbit is around 9 times larger (in radius and length) than geostationary orbit. (Note: Approximately 8.6 times when the Moon is nearest (363,104 km ÷ 42,164 km) to 9.6 times when the Moon is farthest (405,696 km ÷ 42,164 km).)

The three most important Earth Orbits and the inner and outer Van Allen radiation belt

Various Earth orbits to scale: the innermost, the red dotted line represents the orbit of the International Space Station (ISS); cyan represents low Earth orbit, yellow represents medium Earth orbit, The green dashed line represents the orbit of Global Positioning System (GPS) satellites, and; the outermost, the black dashed line represents geostationary orbit.

This is a list of types of gravitational orbit classified by various characteristics.

== Common abbreviations ==
=== List of abbreviations of common Earth orbits ===
Orbit	Name
GEO	Geostationary orbit
LEO	Low Earth orbit
MEO	Medium Earth orbit
SSO	Sun-synchronous orbit

=== List of abbreviations of other orbits ===
Orbit	Name
GSO	Geosynchronous orbit
GTO	Geostationary transfer orbit
HCO	Heliocentric orbit
HEO	Highly elliptical orbit
NRHO	Near-rectilinear halo orbit
VLEO	Very Low Earth Orbit

== Classifications ==
The following is a list of types of orbits:

=== Centric classifications ===
- Galactocentric orbit: An orbit about the center of a galaxy. The Sun follows this type of orbit about the Galactic Center of the Milky Way.
- Heliocentric orbit: An orbit around the Sun. In the Solar System, all planets, comets, and asteroids are in such orbits, as are many artificial satellites and pieces of space debris. Moons by contrast are not in a heliocentric orbit but rather orbit their parent object.
- Geocentric orbit: An orbit around the planet Earth, such as that of the Moon or of artificial satellites.
- Selenocentric orbit (named after Selene): An orbit around Earth's Moon.
- Areocentric orbit (named after Ares): An orbit around the planet Mars, such as that of its moons or artificial satellites.

For orbits centered about planets other than Earth and Mars and for the dwarf planet Pluto, the orbit names incorporating Greek terminology are not as established and much less commonly used:

- Mercury orbit (Hermeocentric orbit, named after Hermes): An orbit around the planet Mercury.
- Venus orbit (Cytherocentric orbit, named after Cytherea, or Aphrodiocentric, after Aphrodite): An orbit around the planet Venus.
- Jupiter orbit (Zenocentric orbit, named after Zeus, or Latin equivalent Jovicentric): An orbit around the planet Jupiter.
- Saturn orbit (Kronocentric orbit, named after Cronus, or Latin equivalent Saturnicentric): An orbit around the planet Saturn.
- Uranus orbit (Uranocentric orbit, named after Uranus): An orbit around the planet Uranus.

=== Altitude classifications for geocentric orbits ===
- Transatmospheric orbit (TAO): geocentric orbits with an apogee above 100 km and perigee that intersects with the defined atmosphere.
- Very low Earth orbit (VLEO) is defined as altitudes between approximately 100 - 450 km above Earth’s surface.
- Low Earth orbit (LEO): geocentric orbits with altitudes below 2,000 km (1,200 mi).
- Medium Earth orbit (MEO): geocentric orbits ranging in altitude from 2,000 km (1,200 mi) to just below geosynchronous orbit at 35,786 kilometers (22,236 mi). Also known as an intermediate circular orbit. These are used for Global Navigation Satellite System spacecraft, such as GPS, GLONASS, Galileo, BeiDou. GPS satellites orbit at an altitude of 20,200 kilometers (12,600 mi) with an orbital period of almost 12 hours.
- Geosynchronous orbit (GSO) and geostationary orbit (GEO) are orbits around Earth matching Earth's sidereal rotation period. Although terms are often used interchangeably, technically a geosynchronous orbit matches the Earth's rotational period, but the definition does not require it to have zero orbital inclination to the equator, and thus is not stationary above a given point on the equator, but may oscillate north and south during the course of a day. Thus, a geostationary orbit is defined as a geosynchronous orbit at zero inclination. Geosynchronous (and geostationary) orbits have a semi-major axis of 42,164 km (26,199 mi). This works out to an altitude of 35,786 km (22,236 mi). Both complete one full orbit of Earth per sidereal day (relative to the stars, not the Sun).
- High Earth orbit: geocentric orbits above the altitude of geosynchronous orbit (35,786 km or 22,236 mi).

For Earth orbiting satellites below the height of about 800 km, the atmospheric drag is the major orbit perturbing force out of all non-gravitational forces. Above 800 km, solar radiation pressure causes the largest orbital perturbations. However, the atmospheric drag strongly depends on the density of the upper atmosphere, which is related to the solar activity, therefore the height at which the impact of the atmospheric drag is similar to solar radiation pressure varies depending on the phase of the solar cycle.

=== Inclination classifications ===
- Inclined orbit: An orbit whose inclination in reference to the equatorial plane is not 0.
  - Polar orbit: An orbit that passes above or nearly above both poles of the planet on each revolution. Therefore, it has an inclination of (or very close to) either 90 degrees or −90 degrees.
  - Polar Sun-synchronous orbit (SSO): A nearly polar orbit that passes the equator at the same local solar time on every pass. Useful for image-taking satellites because shadows will be the same on every pass.
- Non-inclined orbit: An orbit whose inclination is equal to zero with respect to some plane of reference.
  - Ecliptic orbit: A non-inclined orbit with respect to the ecliptic.
  - Equatorial orbit: A non-inclined orbit with respect to the equator.
- Near equatorial orbit: An orbit whose inclination with respect to the equatorial plane is nearly zero. This orbit allows for rapid revisit times (for a single orbiting spacecraft) of near equatorial ground sites.

=== Directional classifications ===
- Prograde orbit: An orbit that is in the same direction as the rotation of the primary (i.e. east on Earth). By convention, the inclination of a Prograde orbit is specified as an angle less than 90°.
- Retrograde orbit: An orbit counter to the direction of rotation of the primary. By convention, retrograde orbits are specified with an inclination angle of more than 90°. Apart from those in Sun-synchronous orbit, few satellites are launched into retrograde orbit on Earth because the quantity of fuel required to launch them is greater than for a prograde orbit. This is because when the rocket starts out on the ground, it already has an eastward component of velocity equal to the rotational velocity of the planet at its launch latitude.

=== Eccentricity classifications ===
There are two types of orbits: closed (periodic) orbits, and open (escape) orbits. Circular and elliptical orbits are closed. Parabolic and hyperbolic orbits are open. Radial orbits can be either open or closed.

- Circular orbit: An orbit that has an eccentricity of 0 and whose path traces a circle.
- Elliptic orbit: An orbit with an eccentricity greater than 0 and less than 1 whose orbit traces the path of an ellipse.
  - Geostationary or geosynchronous transfer orbit (GTO): An elliptic orbit where the perigee is at the altitude of a low Earth orbit (LEO) and the apogee at the altitude of a geostationary orbit.
  - Hohmann transfer orbit: An orbital maneuver that moves a spacecraft from one circular orbit to another using two engine impulses. This maneuver was named after Walter Hohmann.
  - Ballistic capture orbit: a lower-energy orbit than a Hohmann transfer orbit, a spacecraft moving at a lower orbital velocity than the target celestial body is inserted into a similar orbit, allowing the planet or moon to move toward it and gravitationally snag it into orbit around the celestial body.
  - Coelliptic orbit: A relative reference for two spacecraft—or more generally, satellites—in orbit in the same plane. "Coelliptic orbits can be defined as two orbits that are coplanar and confocal. A property of coelliptic orbits is that the difference in magnitude between aligned radius vectors is nearly the same, regardless of where within the orbits they are positioned. For this and other reasons, coelliptic orbits are useful in [spacecraft] rendezvous".
- Parabolic orbit: An orbit with the eccentricity equal to 1. Such an orbit also has a velocity equal to the escape velocity and therefore will escape the gravitational pull of the planet. If the speed of a parabolic orbit is increased it will become a hyperbolic orbit.
  - Escape orbit: A parabolic orbit where the object has escape velocity and is moving away from the planet.
  - Capture orbit: A parabolic orbit where the object has escape velocity and is moving toward the planet.
- Hyperbolic orbit: An orbit with the eccentricity greater than 1. Such an orbit also has a velocity in excess of the escape velocity and as such, will escape the gravitational pull of the planet and continue to travel infinitely until it is acted upon by another body with sufficient gravitational force.
- Radial orbit: An orbit with zero angular momentum and eccentricity equal to 1. The two objects move directly towards or away from each other in a straight-line.
  - Radial elliptic orbit: A closed elliptic orbit where the object is moving at less than the escape velocity. This is an elliptic orbit with semi-minor axis = 0 and eccentricity = 1. Although the eccentricity is 1, this is not a parabolic orbit.
  - Radial parabolic orbit: An open parabolic orbit where the object is moving at the escape velocity.
  - Radial hyperbolic orbit: An open hyperbolic orbit where the object is moving at greater than the escape velocity. This is a hyperbolic orbit with semi-minor axis = 0 and eccentricity = 1. Although the eccentricity is 1, this is not a parabolic orbit.

=== Synchronicity classifications ===
Geostationary orbit as seen from the north celestial pole. To an observer on the rotating Earth, the red and yellow satellites appear stationary in the sky above Singapore and Africa respectively.

- Synchronous orbit: An orbit whose period is a rational multiple of the average rotational period of the body being orbited and in the same direction of rotation as that body. This means the track of the satellite, as seen from the central body, will repeat exactly after a fixed number of orbits. In practice, only 1:1 ratio (geosynchronous) and 1:2 ratios (semi-synchronous) are common.
  - Geosynchronous orbit (GSO): An orbit around the Earth with a period equal to one sidereal day, which is Earth's average rotational period of 23 hours, 56 minutes, 4.091 seconds. For a nearly circular orbit, this implies an altitude of approximately 35,786 kilometers (22,236 mi). The orbit's inclination and eccentricity may not necessarily be zero. If both the inclination and eccentricity are zero, then the satellite will appear stationary from the ground. If not, then each day the satellite traces out an analemma (i.e. a "figure-eight") in the sky, as seen from the ground. When the orbit is circular and the rotational period has zero inclination, the orbit is considered to also be geostationary. Also known as a Clarke orbit after the writer Arthur C. Clarke.
    - Geostationary orbit (GEO): A circular geosynchronous orbit with an inclination of zero. To an observer on the ground this satellite appears as a fixed point in the sky. "All geostationary orbits must be geosynchronous, but not all geosynchronous orbits are geostationary."
    - Tundra orbit: A synchronous but highly elliptic orbit with significant inclination (typically close to 63.4°) and orbital period of one sidereal day (23 hours, 56 minutes for the Earth). Such a satellite spends most of its time over a designated area of the planet. The particular inclination keeps the perigee shift small.
  - Areosynchronous orbit (ASO): A synchronous orbit around the planet Mars with an orbital period equal in length to Mars' sidereal day, 24.6229 hours.
    - Areostationary orbit (AEO): A circular areosynchronous orbit on the equatorial plane and about 17,000 km (10,557 miles) above the surface of Mars. To an observer on Mars this satellite would appear as a fixed point in the sky.
- Subsynchronous orbit: A drift orbit close below GSO/GEO.
  - Semi-synchronous orbit: An orbit with an orbital period equal to half of the average rotational period of the body being orbited and in the same direction of rotation as that body. For Earth this means a period of just under 12 hours at an altitude of approximately 20,200 km (12,544.2 miles) if the orbit is circular.
    - Molniya orbit: A semi-synchronous variation of a Tundra orbit. For Earth this means an orbital period of just under 12 hours. Such a satellite spends most of its time over two designated areas of the planet. An inclination of 63.4° is normally used to keep the perigee shift small.
- Supersynchronous orbit: Any orbit in which the orbital period of a satellite or celestial body is greater than the rotational period of the body which contains the barycenter of the orbit.

=== Orbits in galaxies or galaxy models ===
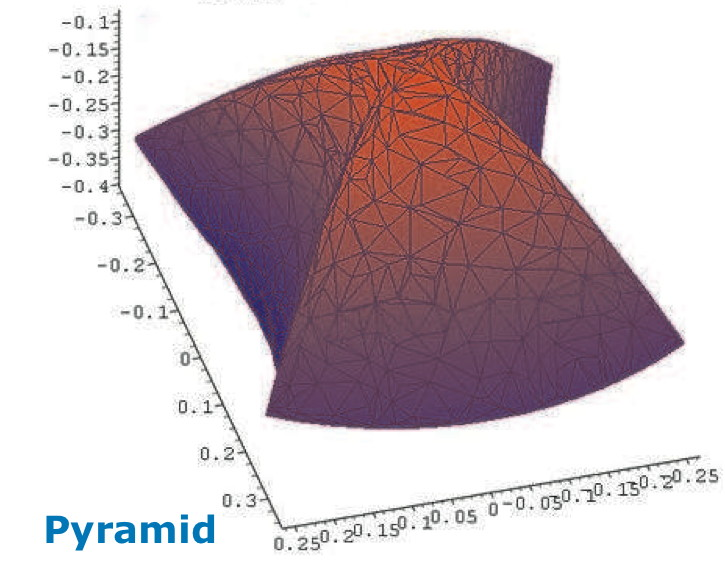
Pyramid orbit

- Box orbit: An orbit in a triaxial elliptical galaxy that fills in a roughly box-shaped region.
- Pyramid orbit: An orbit near a massive black hole at the center of a triaxial galaxy. The orbit can be described as a Keplerian ellipse that precesses about the black hole in two orthogonal directions, due to torques from the triaxial galaxy. The eccentricity of the ellipse reaches unity at the four corners of the pyramid, allowing the star on the orbit to come very close to the black hole.
- Tube orbit: An orbit near a massive black hole at the center of an axisymmetric galaxy. Similar to a pyramid orbit, except that one component of the orbital angular momentum is conserved; as a result, the eccentricity never reaches unity.

=== Special classifications ===
- Sun-synchronous orbit: An orbit which combines altitude and inclination in such a way that the satellite passes over any given point of the planets's surface at the same local solar time. Such an orbit can place a satellite in constant sunlight and is useful for imaging, spy, and weather satellites.
- Frozen orbit: An orbit in which natural drifting due to the central body's shape has been minimized by careful selection of the orbital parameters.
- Orbit of the Moon: The orbital characteristics of the Moon. Average altitude of 384,403 kilometres (238,857 mi), elliptical-inclined orbit.
- Beyond-low Earth orbit (BLEO) and beyond Earth orbit (BEO) are a broad class of orbits that are energetically farther out than low Earth orbit or require an insertion into a heliocentric orbit as part of a journey that may require multiple orbital insertions, respectively.
- Near-rectilinear halo orbit (NRHO): an orbit currently planned in cislunar space, as a selenocentric orbit that will serve as a staging area for future missions. Planned orbit for the NASA Lunar Gateway in circa 2024, as a highly-elliptical seven-day near-rectilinear halo orbit around the Moon, which would bring the small space station within 3,000 kilometers (1,900 mi) of the lunar north pole at closest approach and as far away as 70,000 kilometers (43,000 mi) over the lunar south pole.
- Distant retrograde orbit (DRO): A stable circular retrograde orbit (usually referring to Lunar Distant Retrograde Orbit). Stability means that satellites in DRO do not need to use station keeping propellant to stay in orbit. The lunar DRO is a high lunar orbit with a radius of approximately 61,500 km. This was proposed in 2017 as a possible orbit for the Lunar Gateway space station, outside Earth-Moon L1 and L2.
- Decaying orbit: A decaying orbit is an orbit at a low altitude that decreases over time due atmospheric resistance. Used to dispose of dying artificial satellites or to aerobrake an interplanetary spacecraft.
- Earth-trailing orbit, a heliocentric orbit that is placed such that the satellite will initially follow Earth but at a somewhat slower orbital angular speed, such that it moves further behind year by year. This orbit was used on the Spitzer Space Telescope in order to drastically reduce the heat load from the warm Earth from a more typical geocentric orbit used for space telescopes.
- Graveyard orbit (or disposal, junk orbit) : An orbit that satellites are moved into at the end of their operation. For geostationary satellites a few hundred kilometers above geosynchronous orbit.
- Parking orbit, a temporary orbit.
- Transfer orbit, an orbit used during an orbital maneuver from one orbit to another.
  - Lunar transfer orbit (LTO) accomplished with trans-lunar injection (TLI)
  - Mars transfer orbit (MTO) also known as trans-Mars injection (TMI) orbit
- Repeat orbit: An orbit where the ground track of the satellite repeats after a period of time.
- Gangale orbit: a solar orbit near Mars whose period is one Martian year, but whose eccentricity and inclination both differ from that of Mars such that a relay satellite in a Gangale orbit is visible from Earth even during solar conjunction.

=== Pseudo-orbit classifications ===
A diagram showing the five Lagrangian points in a two-body system with one body far more massive than the other (e.g. the Sun and the Earth). In such a system, L_{3}–L_{5} are situated slightly outside of the secondary's orbit despite their appearance in this small scale diagram.

- Horseshoe orbit: An orbit that appears to a ground observer to be orbiting a certain planet but is actually in co-orbit with the planet. See asteroids 3753 Cruithne and 2002 AA_{29}.
- Libration point orbits such as halo orbits and Lissajous orbits: These are orbits around a Lagrangian point. Lagrange points are shown in the adjacent diagram, and orbits near these points allow a spacecraft to stay in constant relative position with very little use of fuel. Orbits around the L_{1} point are used by spacecraft that want a constant view of the Sun, such as the Solar and Heliospheric Observatory. Orbits around L_{2} are used by missions that always want both Earth and the Sun behind them. This enables a single shield to block radiation from both Earth and the Sun, allowing passive cooling of sensitive instruments. Examples include the Wilkinson Microwave Anisotropy Probe and the James Webb Space Telescope. L1, L2, and L3 are unstable orbits[6], meaning that small perturbations will cause the orbiting craft to drift out of the orbit without periodic corrections.
- P/2 orbit, a highly-stable 2:1 lunar resonant orbit, that was first used with the spacecraft TESS (Transiting Exoplanet Survey Satellite) in 2018.

== See also ==
- Geocentric orbits
- Orbital spaceflight
- Osculating orbit
- Kessler syndrome
