= Near-equatorial orbit =

Type of orbit around an astronomical body

A near-equatorial orbit is an orbit that lies close to the equatorial plane of the primary body orbited. Such an orbit has an inclination near 0°. Such orbits lie near the primary's celestial equator, the great circle of the imaginary celestial sphere that is coplanar with the primary's equator. A geostationary orbit is a particular type of equatorial orbit, one which is geosynchronous. A satellite in a geostationary orbit appears stationary, always at the same point in the sky, to observers on the surface of the Earth.

Equatorial orbits can be advantageous for several reasons. For launches of human technology to space, sites near the Equator, such as the Guiana Space Centre in Kourou, French Guiana, or Alcantara Launch Centre in Brazil, can be good locations for spaceports as they provide some additional orbital speed to the launch vehicle by imparting the rotational speed of the Earth, 460 m/s, to the spacecraft at launch. The added velocity reduces the fuel needed to launch spacecraft to orbit. Since Earth rotates eastward, only launches eastward take advantage of this boost of speed. Westward launches, in fact, are especially difficult from the Equator because of the need to counteract the extra rotational speed.

Equatorial orbits offer other advantages, such as to communication: a spaceship in an equatorial orbit passes directly over an equatorial spaceport on every rotation, in contrast to the varying ground track of an inclined orbit.

== Non-inclined orbit ==
A non-inclined orbit is an orbit coplanar with a plane of reference. The orbital inclination is 0° for prograde orbits, and π (180°) for retrograde ones.

If the plane of reference is a massive spheroid body's equatorial plane, these orbits are called equatorial, and the non-inclined orbit is merely a special case of the near-equatorial orbit.

However, a non-inclined orbit need not be referenced only to an equatorial reference plane. If the plane of reference is the ecliptic plane, they are called an ecliptic orbit.

As non-inclined orbits lack nodes, the ascending node is undefined, as well as its related classical orbital elements, the longitude of the ascending node and the argument of periapsis. In these cases, alternative orbital elements or different definitions must be used to ensure an orbit is fully described.

A geostationary orbit is a geosynchronous example of an equatorial orbit, non-inclined orbit that is coplanar with the equator of Earth.

== See also ==
- List of orbits
- Geostationary orbit (GEO)
- Celestial equator
- Orbital inclination
- Inclined orbit
