= Orbital arc =

Imaginary Arc in the Sky

An orbital arc is an imaginary arc in the sky composed of the connected pointing angles of all the geostationary satellites seen from any given location on the surface of the earth.

== Training ==
Modern VSAT satellite receiver system installations take into consideration the orbital arc when conducting a site survey to determine the optimal location for the earth station. Best practice methods for factoring in the orbital arc during a site survey are contained in VSAT training:

- The VSAT Installation Manual Video Presentation shows an example of the orbital arc to be considered when conducting a site survey for installing a VSAT
