= Areosynchronous orbit =

The areosynchronous orbits (ASO) are the synchronous orbits for artificial satellites around the planet Mars. They are the martian equivalent of the geosynchronous orbits (GSO) on the Earth. The prefix areo- derives from Ares, the ancient Greek god of war and counterpart to the Roman god Mars, with whom the planet was identified. The modern Greek word for Mars is Άρης (Áris).

As with all synchronous orbits, an areosynchronous orbit has an orbital period equal in length to the primary's sidereal day. A satellite in areosynchronous orbit does not necessarily maintain a fixed position in the sky as seen by an observer on the surface of Mars; however, such a satellite will return to the same apparent position every Martian day.

The orbital altitude required to maintain an areosynchronous orbit is approximately 17,000 kilometres (11,000 mi). If a satellite in areosynchronous orbit were to be used as a communication relay link, it "would experience communications ranges of 17,000 to 20,000 kilometres (11,000 to 12,000 mi)" to various points on the visible Martian surface.

An areosynchronous orbit that is equatorial (in the same plane as the equator of Mars), circular, and prograde (rotating about Mars's axis in the same direction as the planet's surface) is known as an areostationary orbit (AEO). To an observer on the surface of Mars, the position of a satellite in AEO would appear to be fixed in a constant position in the sky. The AEO is analogous to a geostationary orbit (GEO) about Earth.

Although no satellites currently occupy areosynchronous or areostationary orbits, some scientists foresee a future telecommunications network for the exploration of Mars.

== See also ==
- Areostationary orbit
- Geosynchronous orbit
- List of orbits
