= Norwegian Space Agency =

Government agency of the Norwegian space programme

- Norsk Romsenter

Agency overview
- Abbreviation: NOSA
- Formed: 1987
- Type: Space agency
- Headquarters: Skøyen, Oslo, Norway
- Official languages: Norwegian; English
- Owner: Norwegian Government
- Website: www.romsenter.no

The Norwegian Space Agency (NOSA) (formerly the Norwegian Space Centre (NSC); Norwegian: Norsk Romsenter) is a Norwegian government agency that follows Norway's public space activities. NOSA's goal is to ensure that Norway benefits from any space activity in which Norway engages in.

The agency was established as the Norwegian Space Centre in 1987 in conjunction with Norway's decision to join the European Space Agency (ESA). It functions as an agency of the Norwegian Ministry of Trade and Industry. Its purpose is to conduct space activities that are of use to society and contribute to business development. The agency is also charged with safeguarding and promoting Norway's interests in relation to ESA, the EU space programmes and in bilateral agreements with other countries. Its headquarters is located in Oslo.

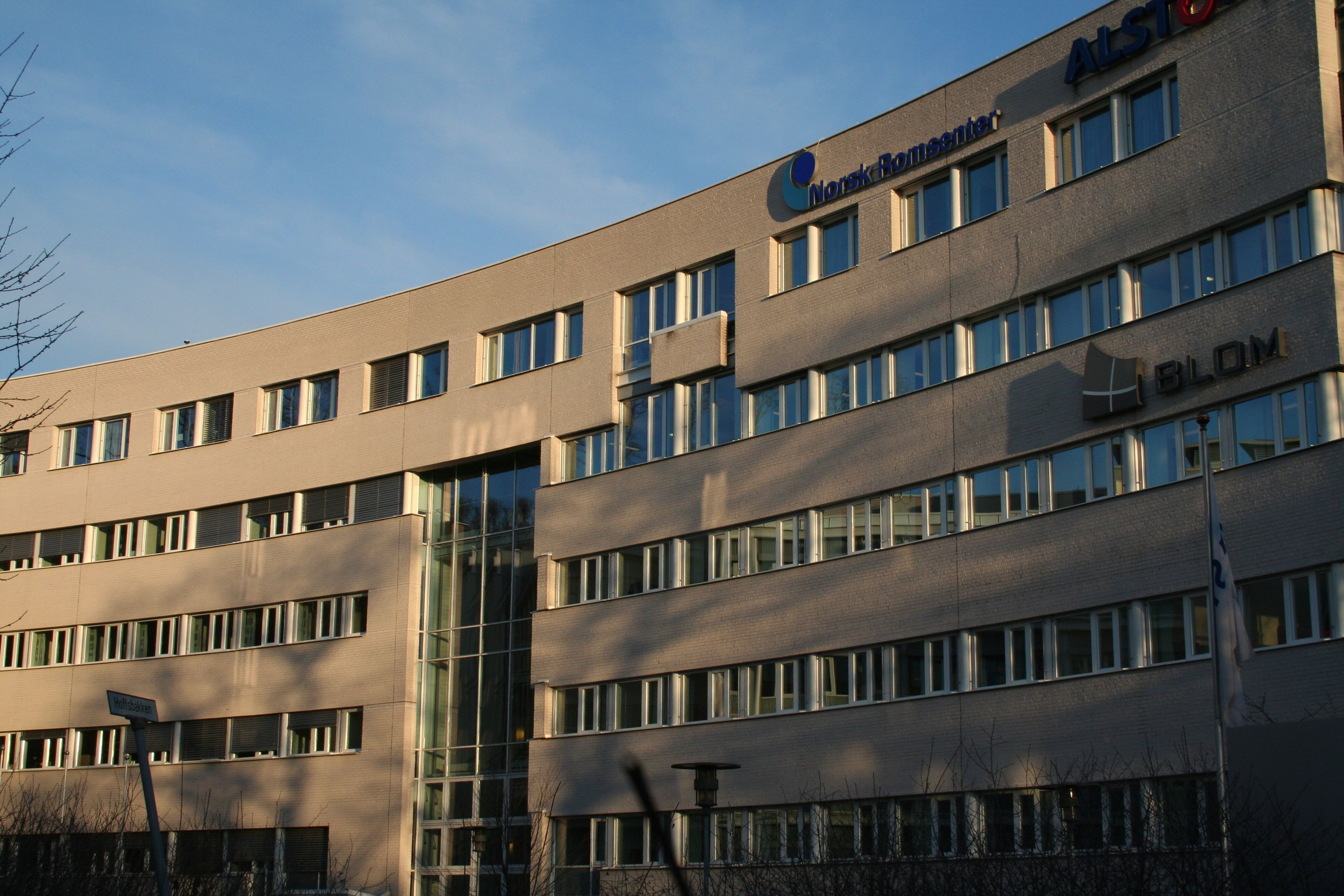
Norsk Romsenter headquarters in Oslo

== History ==
Norway has been engaged in space activities since the 1960s, well before the agency's founding. On 18 August 1962, the first rocket was launched from the Andøya Space Center in Vesterålen, Norway; this facility has been in regular use as a launch site for space-bound vehicles ever since. By 2012, in excess of 1,000 sounding rockets had reportedly been launched from Norwegian soil. Furthermore, since the 1960s, Norway started routinely funding satellite communications research, which has helped the country develop itself as the optimum location for receiving date from satellites stationed in a polar orbit. Norway was reportedly the first nation to use satellite communicates inland, enabling it to better support its oil industry and remote sites in the Arctic wilderness.

During 1987, Norway became a member states of the European Space Agency (ESA). That same year, Norwegian Space Centre was established as a government body responsible for organising Norwegian space activities, particularly those related to the ESA and other international efforts, as well as its work in coordinating national efforts. One of its roles is to manage and distribute funding to most efficiently support the space sector and benefit Norwegian interests. Proposals produced by the body are overseen by the Norwegian Ministry of Trade and Industry.

Since the agency's founding, Norway has continued to expand its space-based activities. The nation hosts the largest ground station for the Galileo global navigation satellite system (GNSS). Norwegian-built components have been integrated into many satellites in addition to the Ariane 5 heavy-lift launch vehicle and the International Space Station; various space-based missions have also sourced technologies from Norway. The country has also been a location for testing equipment bound for extraterrestrial use to evaluate its ability to withstand local conditions.

During 1997, the Andøya Space Center was privatised, the Norwegian Space Center acquired a 90% stake in it as a consequence; the center is run on a commercial basis for undertaking both domestic and international missions. During the 2010s, the agency has been a partner in the development of the Nucleus hybrid sounding rocket, which is intended to be safer, cheaper, and more environmentally-friendly than prior models. During February 2019, the Norwegian Space Centre was formally renamed as the Norwegian Space Agency; according to Communication Director Marianne Moen, this change was enacted to reduce confusion over the organisation's function and to clarify that its status as a government body.

== Space Norway ==
Space Norway is a related Norwegian space company that was established during 2014. Its mission statement is to own and/or lease space infrastructure and to make investments in space-related activities. While it operates as a commercial limited liability company, Space Norway is entirely owned by the Government of Norway. The company has been allocated a 50% stake in Kongsberg Satellite Services, which specialises in reading data from in-orbit Earth observation satellites on behalf of various satellite owners. In July 2019, Space Norway contracted with American companies Northrop Grumman and SpaceX to build and launch respectively its two-satellite Arctic Satellite Broadband Mission (ASBM) system, which launched in August 2024.

== See also ==
- List of government space agencies
- Andøya Space Center
- Hinode Science Data Centre Europe
