= Areostationary orbit =

Circular areosynchronous orbit in the Martian equatorial plane

A simulation of a 4-satellite constellation in areostationary orbit

An areostationary orbit, areosynchronous equatorial orbit (AEO), or Mars geostationary orbit is a circular areosynchronous orbit (ASO) approximately 17,032 km (10,583 mi) in altitude above the Mars equator and following the direction of Mars's rotation.

An object in such an orbit has an orbital period equal to Mars's rotational period, and so to ground observers it appears motionless in a fixed position in the sky. It is the Martian analog of a geostationary orbit (GEO), with a distance from its planet's surface approximately half that of GEO. The prefix areo- derives from Ares, the ancient Greek god of war and counterpart to the Roman god Mars, with whom the planet was identified.

Although it would allow for uninterrupted communication and observation of the Martian surface, no artificial satellites have been placed in this orbit due to the technical complexity of achieving and maintaining one.

== Characteristics ==
The radius of an areostationary orbit can be calculated using Kepler's Third Law.

$T^2 = \left({4\pi^2\over{GM}}\right) a^{3}$

Where:

Variable	Definition	Value
T	Rotational Period	88,642 seconds
G	Gravitational constant	6.674×10^{−11} N⋅m^{2}/kg^{2}
M	Mass of central object	6.4171×10^{23} kg
a	Semimajor axis	20,428 km

Substituting the mass of Mars for M and the Martian sidereal day for T and solving for the semimajor axis yields a synchronous orbit radius of 20,428 km (12,693 mi) above the surface of the Mars equator. Subtracting Mars's radius gives an orbital altitude of 17,032 km (10,583 mi).

Two stable longitudes exist - 17.92°W and 167.83°E. Satellites placed at any other longitude will tend to drift to these stable longitudes over time.

== Feasibility ==
Several factors make placing a spacecraft into an areostationary orbit more difficult than a geostationary orbit. Since the areostationary orbit lies between Mars's two natural satellites, Phobos (semi-major axis: 9,376 km) and Deimos (semi-major axis: 23,463 km), any satellites in the orbit will suffer increased orbital station keeping costs due to unwanted orbital resonance effects. Mars's gravity is also much less spherical than Earth due to uneven volcanism (i.e. Olympus Mons). This creates additional gravitational disturbances not present on Earth, further destabilizing the orbit. Solar radiation pressure and sun-based perturbations are also present, as with an Earth-based geostationary orbit. Actually placing a satellite into such an orbit is further complicated by the distance from Earth and related challenges shared by any attempted Mars mission.

== Uses ==
Satellites in an areostationary orbit would allow for greater amounts of data to be relayed back from the Martian surface easier than by using current methods. Satellites in the orbit would also be advantageous for monitoring Martian weather and mapping of the Martian surface.

In the early 2000s NASA explored the feasibility of placing communications satellites in an areocentric orbit as a part of the Mars Communication Network. In the concept, an areostationary relay satellite would transmit data from a network of landers and smaller satellites in lower Martian orbits back to Earth.

== See also ==
- Geostationary orbit
- Areosynchronous orbit
- List of orbits
