= Inclined orbit =

Orbital plane that is tipped away from the equator

A satellite is said to occupy an inclined orbit around Earth if the orbit exhibits an angle other than 0° to the equatorial plane. This angle is called the orbit's inclination. A planet is said to have an inclined orbit around the Sun if it has an angle other than 0° to the ecliptic plane.

== Types of inclined orbits ==
=== Geosynchronous orbits ===
A geosynchronous orbit is an orbit with an altitude of approximately 36,000 km (22,000 mi) that completes one revolution every sidereal day. If the orbit is perfectly circular and not inclined, the satellite will remain at a fixed point in the sky. If the orbit is inclined, it will the satellite will exhibit a diurnal motion up and down perpendicular to the equator. If the orbit is not perfectly circular, the satellite will exhibit a diurnal motion forwards and backwards along the equator. If the orbit is both inclined and elliptical, the satellite will trace out a small figure-eight shape in the sky. A geostationary orbit is a special case of geosynchronous orbit with no inclination and zero eccentricity, and therefore no apparent movement across the sky from a fixed observation point on the Earth's surface.

Due to their inherent instability, geostationary orbits will eventually become inclined if they are not corrected using thrusters. At the end of the satellite's lifetime, when fuel approaches depletion, satellite operators may decide to omit these expensive manoeuvres to correct inclination and only control eccentricity. This prolongs the life-time of the satellite as it consumes less fuel over time, but the satellite can then only be used by ground antennas capable of following the north–south movement, satellite-tracking Earth stations.

=== Polar orbits ===
A polar orbit has an inclination of 90 degrees passing over the poles of the planet on each pass. These types of orbits are often used for earth observation and weather services.

=== Sun-synchronous orbits ===
This is a special type of orbit that precesses at the same rate that the sun moves along the ecliptic, causing the satellite to rise over a fixed location on the earth's surface at the same mean solar time every day.

These orbits have an inclination governed by the equation:

$$\cos(i) \approx -\left( \frac{T}{3.795\text{ hr}} \right)^\frac{7}{3}$$

where $i$ is the orbital inclination, and $T$ is the orbital period.

== See also ==
- List of orbits
- Orbital inclination
- Non-inclined orbit
