= Tundra orbit =

Highly elliptical and highly inclined synchronous orbit

Animation of two Tundra orbits with inclination of 63.4° and different eccentricities. The apparent loop is due to the use of an Earth fixed frame, co-rotating during diurnal motion; the Tundra orbits are simple ellipses in an Earth-centered inertial frame. 0.2 eccentricity · 0.3 eccentricity · Earth

A Tundra orbit (Russian: орбита «Тундра») is a highly elliptical geosynchronous orbit with a high inclination (approximately 63.4°), an orbital period of one sidereal day, and a typical eccentricity between 0.2 and 0.3. A satellite placed in this orbit spends most of its time over a chosen area of the Earth, a phenomenon known as apogee dwell, which makes them particularly well suited for communications satellites serving high-latitude regions.

The Tundra orbit, like the Molniya orbit, was developed by Soviet scientists. The Molniya orbit was specifically designed in the 1960s to provide better communication coverage for high-latitude regions, which geostationary satellites struggled to cover effectively. The Tundra orbit, while similar in its high inclination and elliptical shape, was developed later to offer continuous coverage over specific areas by having satellites spend most of their time over a chosen region. Both orbits were innovative solutions to the unique challenges posed by the Soviet Union's geographical location and the need for reliable communication and surveillance capabilities.

The ground track of a satellite in a Tundra orbit is a closed figure 8 with a smaller loop over either the northern or southern hemisphere. This differentiates them from Molniya orbits designed to service high-latitude regions, which have the same inclination but half the period and do not loiter over a single region.

== Uses ==
Tundra and Molniya orbits are used to provide high-latitude users with higher elevation angles than a geostationary orbit. This is desirable as broadcasting to these latitudes from a geostationary orbit (above the Earth's equator) requires considerable power due to the low elevation angles, and the extra distance and atmospheric attenuation that comes with it. Sites located above 81° latitude are unable to view geocentric satellites at all, and as a rule of thumb, elevation angles of less than 10° can cause problems, depending on the communications frequency.

Highly elliptical orbits provide an alternative to geostationary ones, as they remain over their desired high-latitude regions for long periods of time at the apogee. Their convenience is mitigated by cost, however: two satellites are required to provide continuous coverage from a Tundra orbit (three from a Molniya orbit).

A ground station receiving data from a satellite constellation in a highly elliptical orbit must periodically switch between satellites and deal with varying signal strengths, latency and Doppler shifts as the satellite's range changes throughout its orbit. These changes are less pronounced for satellites in a Tundra orbit, given their increased distance from the surface, making tracking and communication more efficient. Additionally, unlike the Molniya orbit, a satellite in a Tundra orbit avoids passing through the Van Allen belts.

Despite these advantages the Tundra orbit is used less often than a Molniya orbit in part due to the higher launch energy required.

=== Proposed uses ===
In 2017 the ESA Space Debris office released a paper proposing that a Tundra-like orbit be used as a disposal orbit for old high-inclination geosynchronous satellites, as opposed to traditional graveyard orbits.

== Properties ==
A typical Tundra orbit has the following properties:

- Inclination: 63.4°
- Argument of perigee: 270°
- Period: 1436 minutes
- Eccentricity: 0.24–0.4
- Semi-major axis: 42,164 km (26,199 mi)

=== Orbital inclination ===
In general, the oblateness of the Earth perturbs a satellite's argument of perigee ($\omega$) such that it gradually changes with time. If we only consider the first-order coefficient $J_2$, the perigee will change according to equation 1, unless it is constantly corrected with station-keeping thruster burns.

$\dot{\omega} = \frac{3}{4} n J_2\left(\frac{R_E}{a}\right)^2 \frac{4 - 5\sin^2 i}{(1 - e^2)^2},$	1

where $i$ is the orbital inclination, $e$ is the eccentricity, $n$ is mean motion in degrees per day, $J_2$ is the perturbing factor, $R_E$ is the radius of the Earth, $a$ is the semimajor axis, and $\dot{\omega}$ is in degrees per day.

To avoid this expenditure of fuel, the Tundra orbit uses an inclination of 63.4°, for which the factor $(4 - 5\sin^2 i)$ is zero, so that there is no change in the position of perigee over time. This is called the critical inclination, and an orbit designed in this manner is called a frozen orbit.

=== Argument of perigee ===
An argument of perigee of 270° places apogee at the northernmost point of the orbit. An argument of perigee of 90° would likewise serve the high southern latitudes. An argument of perigee of 0° or 180° would cause the satellite to dwell over the equator, but there would be little point to this as this could be better done with a conventional geostationary orbit.

=== Period ===
The period of one sidereal day ensures that the satellites follows the same ground track over time. This is controlled by the semi-major axis of the orbit.

=== Eccentricity ===
The eccentricity is chosen for the dwell time required, and changes the shape of the ground track. A Tundra orbit generally has an eccentricity of about 0.2; one with an eccentricity of about 0.4, changing the ground track from a figure 8 to a teardrop, is called a Supertundra orbit.

=== Semi-major axis ===
The exact height of a satellite in a Tundra orbit varies between missions, but a typical orbit for an eccentricity of 0.25 will approximately have a perigee altitude of 25,000 kilometres (16,000 mi), an apogee altitude of 46,000 kilometres (29,000 mi), and a semi-major axis of 42,000 kilometres (26,000 mi).

== Spacecraft using Tundra orbits ==
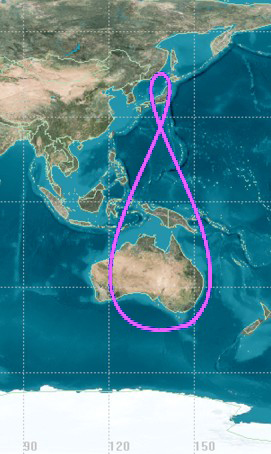
The groundtrack of QZSS orbit, which has similar characteristics to a Tundra orbit, but a lower inclination

Russia currently uses satellites in the Tundra orbit. The EKS (Edinaya Kosmicheskaya Sistema) or Kupol system, which is part of Russia's early warning satellite network, includes satellites that operate in Tundra orbits. These satellites are designed to detect and track ballistic missile launches and provide early warning of potential missile attacks.

From 2000 to 2016, Sirius Satellite Radio, now part of Sirius XM Holdings, operated a constellation of three satellites in Tundra orbits for satellite radio. The RAAN and mean anomaly of each satellite were offset by 120° so that when one satellite moved out of position, another had passed perigee and was ready to take over. The constellation was developed to better reach consumers in far northern latitudes, reduce the impact of urban canyons and required only 130 repeaters compared to 800 for a geostationary system. After Sirius' merger with XM it changed the design and orbit of the FM-6 replacement satellite from a tundra to a geostationary one. This supplemented the already geostationary FM-5 (launched 2009), and in 2016 Sirius discontinued broadcasting from tundra orbits. The Sirius satellites were the only commercial satellites to use a Tundra orbit.

The Japanese Quasi-Zenith Satellite System uses a geosynchronous orbit similar to a Tundra orbit, but with an inclination of only 43°. It includes four satellites following the same ground track. It was tested from 2010 and became fully operational in November 2018.

=== Proposed systems ===
The Tundra orbit was considered for use by the ESA's Archimedes project, a broadcasting system proposed in the 1990s.

Comparison of Tundra orbit, QZSS orbit and Molniya orbit - equatorial view

Front view

Side view

Front view, Earth fixed frame

Side view, Earth fixed frame

Tundra orbit · QZSS orbit · Molniya orbit · Earth

== See also ==
- Elliptic orbit
- List of orbits
- Molniya orbit
