= Geosynchronous orbit =

Orbit keeping the satellite at a fixed longitude above the equator

Animation (not to scale) showing geosynchronous satellite orbiting the Earth

A geosynchronous orbit (sometimes abbreviated GSO) is an Earth-centered orbit with an orbital period that matches Earth's rotation on its axis, 23 hours, 56 minutes, and 4 seconds (one sidereal day). The synchronization of rotation and orbital period means that, for an observer on Earth's surface, an object in geosynchronous orbit returns to exactly the same position in the sky after a period of one sidereal day. Over the course of a day, the object's position in the sky may remain still or trace out a path, typically in a figure-8 form, whose precise characteristics depend on the orbit's inclination and eccentricity. A circular geosynchronous orbit has a constant altitude of 35,786 km (22,236 mi).

A special case of geosynchronous orbit is the geostationary orbit (often abbreviated GEO), which is a circular geosynchronous orbit in Earth's equatorial plane with both inclination and eccentricity equal to 0. A satellite in a geostationary orbit remains in the same position in the sky to observers on the surface.

Communications satellites are often given geostationary or close-to-geostationary orbits, so that the satellite antennas that communicate with them do not have to move but can be pointed permanently at the fixed location in the sky where the satellite appears.

== History ==
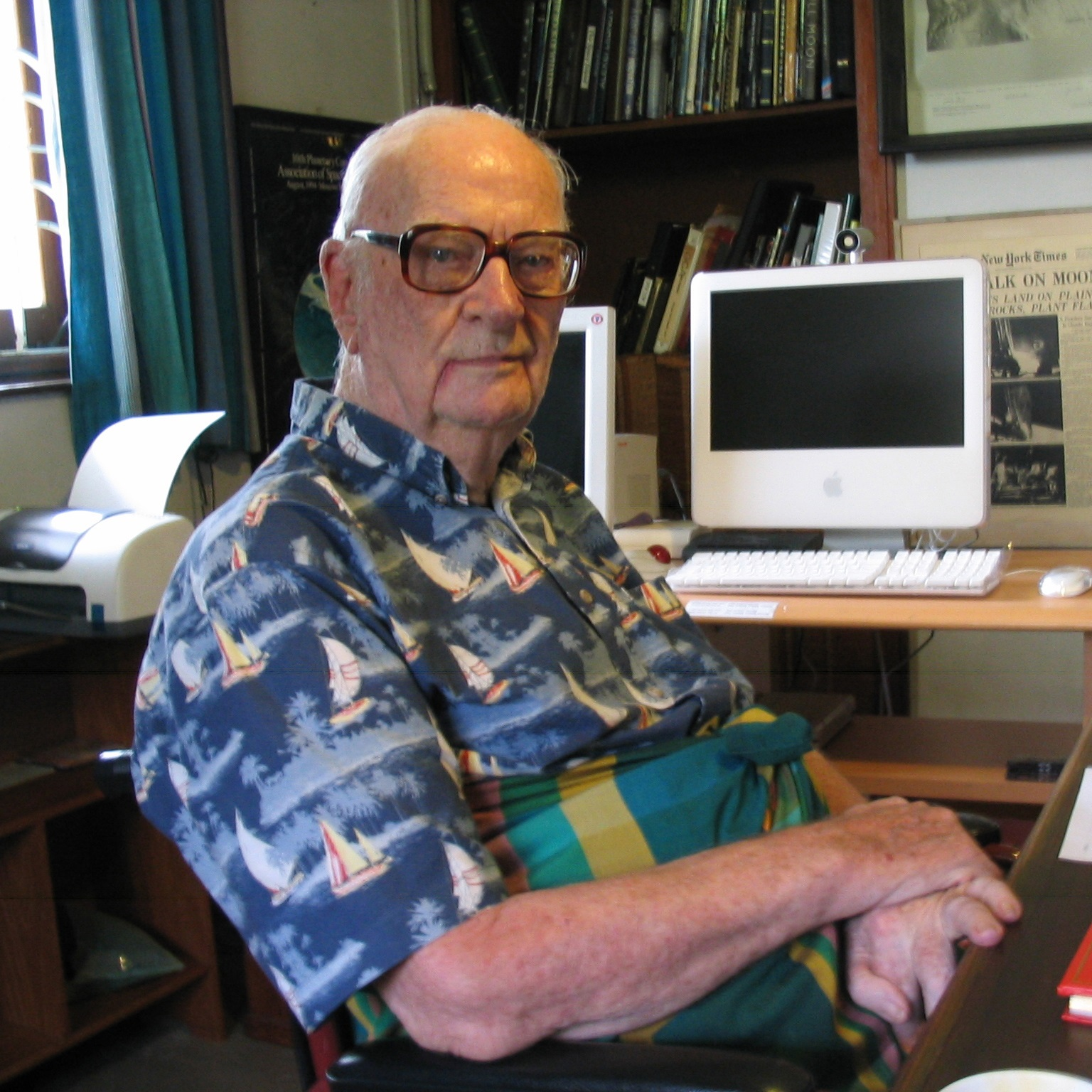
The geosynchronous orbit was popularised by the science fiction author Arthur C. Clarke, and is thus sometimes called the Clarke Orbit.

In 1929, Herman Potočnik described both geosynchronous orbits in general and the special case of the geostationary Earth orbit in particular as useful orbits for space stations. The first appearance of a geosynchronous orbit in popular literature was in October 1942, in the first Venus Equilateral story by George O. Smith, but Smith did not go into details. British science fiction author Arthur C. Clarke popularised and expanded the concept in a 1945 paper entitled Extra-Terrestrial Relays – Can Rocket Stations Give Worldwide Radio Coverage?, published in Wireless World magazine. Clarke acknowledged the connection in his introduction to The Complete Venus Equilateral. The orbit, which Clarke first described as useful for broadcast and relay communications satellites, is sometimes called the Clarke Orbit. Similarly, the collection of artificial satellites in this orbit is known as the Clarke Belt.

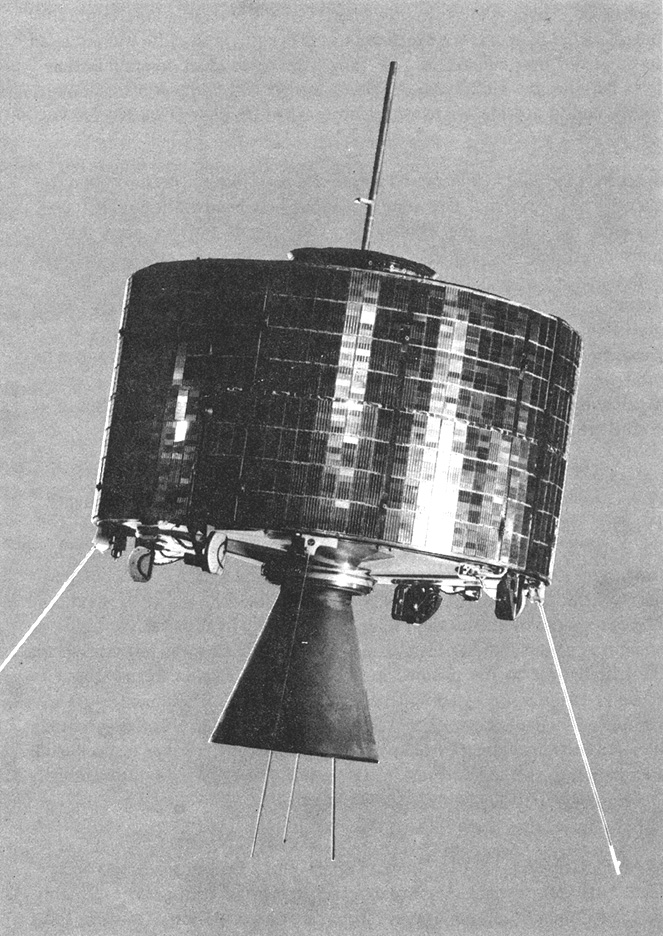
Syncom 2: The first functional geosynchronous satellite

In technical terminology, the geosynchronous orbits are often referred to as geostationary if they are roughly over the equator, but the terms are used somewhat interchangeably. Specifically, geosynchronous Earth orbit (GSO) may be a synonym for geosynchronous equatorial orbit, or geostationary Earth orbit.

The first geosynchronous satellite was designed by Harold Rosen while he was working at Hughes Aircraft in 1959. Inspired by Sputnik 1, he wanted to use a geostationary (geosynchronous equatorial) satellite to globalise communications. Telecommunications between the US and Europe was then possible between just 136 people at a time, and reliant on high frequency radios and an undersea cable.

Conventional wisdom at the time was that it would require too much rocket power to place a satellite in a geosynchronous orbit and it would not survive long enough to justify the expense, so early efforts were put towards constellations of satellites in low or medium Earth orbit. The first of these were the passive Echo balloon satellites in 1960, followed by Telstar 1 in 1962. Although these projects had difficulties with signal strength and tracking that could be solved through geosynchronous satellites, the concept was seen as impractical, so Hughes often withheld funds and support.

By 1961, Rosen and his team produced a cylindrical prototype with a diameter of 76 centimetres (30 in), height of 38 centimetres (15 in), weighing 11.3 kilograms (25 lb); it was light, small enough to place in orbit by then-available rocketry, was spin stabilised and used dipole antennas producing a pancake-shaped waveform. In August 1961, they were contracted to begin building the working satellite. They lost Syncom 1 to electronics failure, but Syncom 2 was successfully placed into a geosynchronous orbit in 1963. Although its inclined orbit still required moving antennas, it was able to relay TV transmissions, and allowed for US President John F. Kennedy to phone Nigerian prime minister Abubakar Tafawa Balewa from a ship on August 23, 1963.

Today, hundreds of geosynchronous satellites provide remote sensing, navigation and communications.

Though most populated land locations on the planet now have terrestrial communications facilities (microwave, fiber-optic), which often have latency and bandwidth advantages, and telephone access covering 96% of the population and internet access 90% as of 2018, some rural and remote areas in developed countries still rely on satellite communications.

== Types ==
=== Geostationary orbit ===
The geostationary satellite (green) always remains above the same marked spot on the equator (brown).

A geostationary orbit (GEO) is a circular (zero eccentricity) geosynchronous orbit in the plane of the Earth's equator (zero inclination) with a radius of approximately 42,164 km (26,199 mi) (measured from the center of the Earth). A satellite in such an orbit is at an altitude of approximately 35,786 km (22,236 mi) above mean sea level. It maintains the same position relative to the Earth's surface. If one could see a satellite in geostationary orbit, it would appear to hover at the same point in the sky, i.e., not exhibit diurnal motion, while the Sun, Moon, and stars would traverse the skies behind it. Such orbits are useful for telecommunications satellites.

A perfectly stable geostationary orbit is an ideal that can only be approximated. In practice the satellite drifts out of this orbit because of perturbations such as the solar wind, radiation pressure, variations in the Earth's gravitational field, and the gravitational effect of the Moon and Sun, and thrusters are used to maintain the orbit in a process known as station-keeping.

Eventually, without the use of thrusters, the orbit becomes inclined, oscillating between 0° and 15° every 55 years. At the end of the satellite's lifetime, when fuel approaches depletion, satellite operators may decide to omit these expensive manoeuvres to correct inclination and only control eccentricity. This prolongs the life-time of the satellite as it consumes less fuel over time, but the satellite can then only be used by ground antennas capable of following the N-S movement.

Geostationary satellites also tend to drift around one of two stable longitudes of 75° and 255° without station keeping.

=== Elliptical and inclined geosynchronous orbits ===
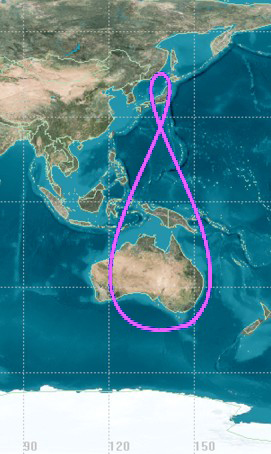
A quasi-zenith satellite orbit

Many objects in geosynchronous orbits have eccentric or inclined orbits. Eccentricity makes the orbit elliptical and appear to oscillate east–west in the sky from the viewpoint of a ground station, while inclination tilts the orbit compared to the equator and makes it appear to oscillate north–south from a ground station. These effects combine to form an analemma (figure-8).

Satellites in elliptical or eccentric orbits must be tracked by steerable ground stations.

==== Tundra orbit ====
The Tundra orbit is an eccentric geosynchronous orbit that allows the satellite to spend most of its time dwelling over one high-latitude location. It sits at an inclination of 63.4°, which is a frozen orbit, which reduces the need for stationkeeping. At least two satellites are needed to provide continuous coverage over an area. It was used by Sirius XM Satellite Radio to improve signal strength in the northern US and Canada.

==== Quasi-zenith orbit ====
The Quasi-Zenith Satellite System (QZSS) is a four-satellite system that operates in a geosynchronous orbit at an inclination of 42° and a 0.075 eccentricity. Each satellite dwells over Japan, allowing signals to reach receivers in urban canyons, then passes quickly over Australia.

== Launch ==
An example of a transition from geostationary transfer orbit (GTO) to geosynchronous orbit (GSO):
EchoStar XVII · Earth

Geosynchronous satellites are launched to the east into a prograde orbit that matches the rotation rate of the equator. The smallest inclination that a satellite can be launched into is that of the launch site's latitude, so launching the satellite from close to the equator limits the amount of inclination change needed later. Additionally, launching from close to the equator allows the speed of the Earth's rotation to give the satellite a boost. A launch site should have water or deserts to the east, so any failed rockets do not fall on a populated area.

Most launch vehicles place geosynchronous satellites directly into a geosynchronous transfer orbit (GTO), an elliptical orbit with an apogee at GSO height and a low perigee. On-board satellite propulsion is then used to raise the perigee, circularise and reach GSO.

Once in a viable geostationary orbit, spacecraft can change longitudinal position by adjusting their semi-major axis such that the new period is shorter or longer than a sidereal day to effect an apparent "drift" eastward or westward, respectively. Once at the desired longitude, the spacecraft's period is restored to geosynchronous.

== Proposed orbits ==
=== Statite proposal ===
A statite is a hypothetical satellite that uses radiation pressure from the Sun against a solar sail to modify its orbit.

It would hold its location over the dark side of the Earth at a latitude of approximately 30 degrees. It would return to the same spot in the sky every 24 hours from an Earth-based viewer's perspective and so be functionally similar to a geosynchronous orbit.

=== Space elevator ===
Another form of geosynchronous orbit is the theoretical space elevator. If a mass orbiting above the geostationary belt is tethered to the earth’s surface, and the mass is accelerated to maintain an orbital period equal to one sidereal day then, since the orbit now requires more downward force than gravity alone supplies, the tether is tensioned by the extra centripetal force required, and this tension keeps the tether structure stable as a crawler carries objects up and down along it.

== Retired satellites ==
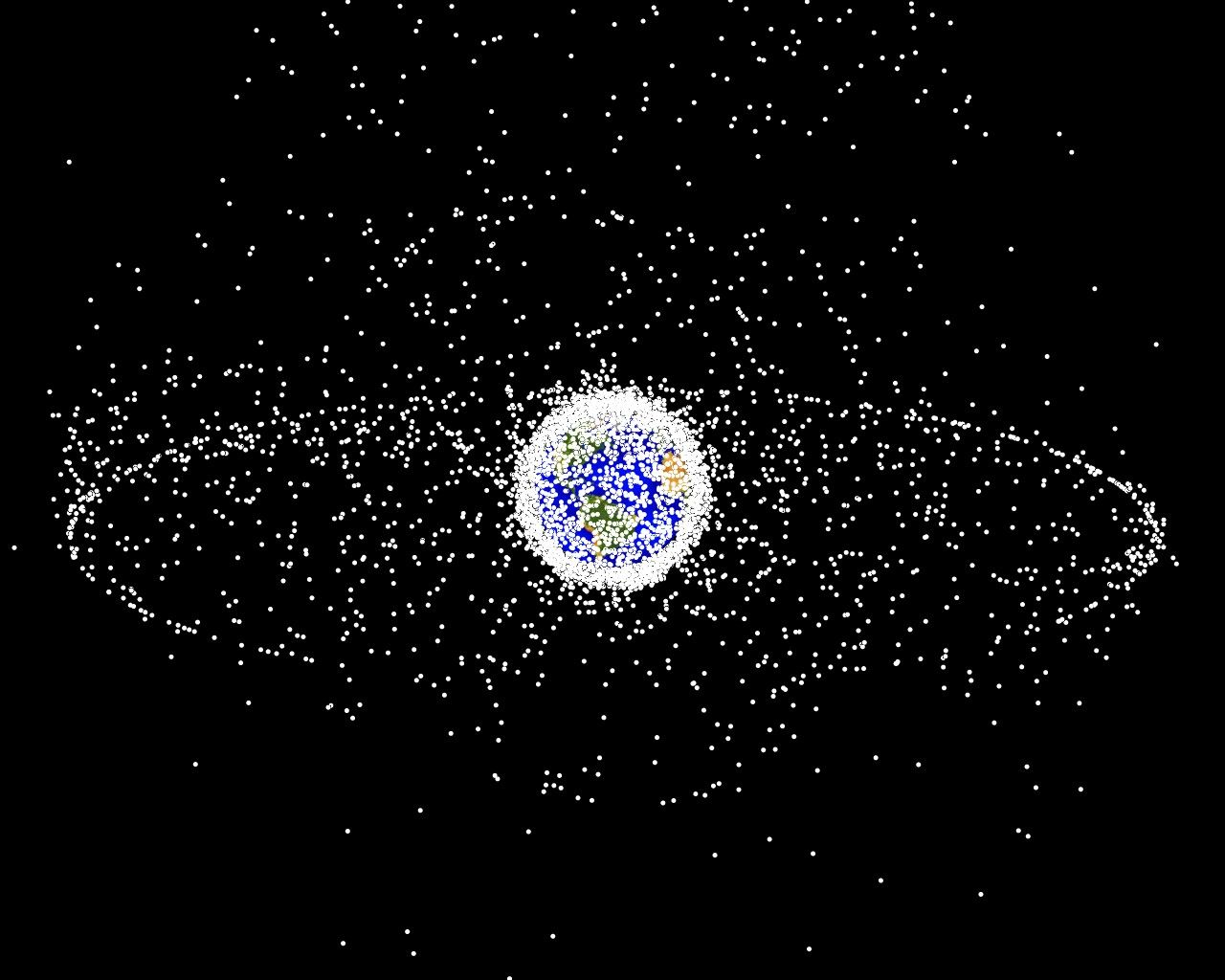
A computer-generated image of space debris. Two debris fields are shown: around geosynchronous space and low Earth orbit.

Geosynchronous satellites require some station-keeping to remain in position, and once they run out of thruster fuel and are no longer useful they are moved into a higher graveyard orbit. It is not feasible to deorbit geosynchronous satellites, for to do so would take far more fuel than would be used by slightly elevating the orbit; and atmospheric drag is negligible, giving GSOs lifetimes of thousands of years.

The retirement process is becoming increasingly regulated and satellites must have a 90% chance of moving over 200 km above the geostationary belt at end of life.

=== Space debris ===
Space debris in geosynchronous orbits typically has a lower collision speed than at LEO (Low Earth Orbit) since most GSO satellites orbit in the same plane, altitude and speed; however, the presence of satellites in eccentric orbits allows for collisions at up to 4 km/s. Although a collision is comparatively unlikely, GSO satellites have a limited ability to avoid any debris.

Debris less than 10 cm in diameter are very challenging to detect from the ground and are not regularly tracked, making it difficult to assess their prevalence.

Despite efforts to reduce risk, spacecraft collisions have occurred. The European Space Agency telecom satellite Olympus-1 was struck by a meteoroid on August 11, 1993, and eventually moved to a graveyard orbit, and in 2006 the Russian Express-AM11 communications satellite was struck by an unknown object and rendered inoperable, although its engineers had enough contact time with the satellite to send it into a graveyard orbit. In 2017 both AMC-9 and Telkom-1 broke apart from an unknown cause.

== Properties ==
The orbit of a geosynchronous satellite at an inclination, from the perspective of an off-Earth observer (ECI) and of an observer rotating around the Earth at its spin rate (ECEF).

A geosynchronous orbit has the following properties:

- Period: 1436 minutes (one sidereal day)
- Semi-major axis: 42,164 km

=== Period ===
All geosynchronous orbits have an orbital period equal to exactly one sidereal day. This means that the satellite returns to the same point above the Earth's surface every (sidereal) day, regardless of other orbital properties. This orbital period, T, is directly related to the semi-major axis of the orbit through the formula:

$$T = 2\pi\sqrt{a^3 \over \mu}$$

where:

- $a$ is the length of the orbit's semi-major axis
- $\mu$ is the standard gravitational parameter of the central body

=== Inclination ===
A geosynchronous orbit can have any inclination.

Satellites commonly have an inclination of zero, ensuring that the orbit remains over the equator at all times, making it stationary with respect to latitude from the point of view of a ground observer (and in the ECEF reference frame).

Another popular inclinations is 63.4° for a Tundra orbit, which ensures that the orbit's argument of perigee does not change over time.

=== Ground track ===
In the special case of a geostationary orbit, the ground track of a satellite is a single point on the equator. In the general case of a geosynchronous orbit with a non-zero inclination or eccentricity, the ground track is a more or less distorted figure-eight, returning to the same places once per sidereal day.

== See also ==
- Geostationary orbit
- Geosynchronous satellite
- Graveyard orbit
- High Earth orbit
- List of orbits
- List of satellites in geosynchronous orbit
- Low Earth orbit
- Medium Earth orbit
- Molniya orbit
- Subsynchronous orbit
- Supersynchronous orbit
- Synchronous orbit
