= List of Thor and Delta launches (1980–1989) =

Between 1980 and 1989, there were 58 Thor missiles launched, of which 56 were successful, giving a 96.6% success rate.

== Launch statistics ==
=== Rocket configurations ===
- Thor DSV-2U
- Delta I (2000)
- Delta I (3000)
- Delta I (4000)
- Delta I (5000)
- Delta II (6000)
- N-I
- N-II
- H-1

=== Launch sites ===
- Cape Canaveral SLC-17A
- Cape Canaveral SLC-17B
- Vandenberg SLC-2W
- Vandenberg SLC-10W
- Tanegashima SLC-N

=== Launch outcomes ===
- Success
- Failure

== 1980 ==
There were 5 Thor missiles launched in 1980. 4 of the 5 launches were successful, giving an 80% success rate.

Date/Time (UTC)	Rocket	S/N	Launch site	Payload	Function	Orbit	Outcome	Remarks
1980-02-14; 15:57	Delta 3910	151 (Thor 635)	CCAFS LC-17A	Solar Maximum Mission	Solar observation satellite	LEO	Success	
1980-02-22; 08:35	N-I	N-6 (F)	Tanegashima SLC-N	ECS-B (Ayame-2)	Experimental communication satellite	GTO	Success	
1980-07-15; 02:22	Thor DSV-2U	Thor 304	VAFB SLC-10W	DMSP-5D-F5	Military weather satellite	planned: LEO / SSO	Failure	Final flight of the Long Tank Thor. Failure attributed to faulty connection between second and third stages, resulting in third stage not receiving electrical power.
1980-09-09; 22:27	Delta 3914	152 (Thor 637)	CCAFS LC-17A	GOES-D (GOES-4)	Weather satellite	GTO	Success	
1980-11-15; 22:49	Delta 3910	153 (Thor 636)	CCAFS LC-17A	SBS-1	Communications satellite	GTO	Success	

== 1981 ==
There were 7 Thor missiles launched in 1981. All 7 launches were successful.

Date/Time (UTC)	Rocket	S/N	Launch site	Payload	Function	Orbit	Outcome	Remarks
1981-02-11; 08:30	N-II	N-7 (F)	Tanegashima SLC-N	ETS-4 (Kiku-3)	Technological demonstration satellite	MEO	Success	
1981-05-22; 22:29	Delta 3914	154 (Thor 645)	CCAFS LC-17A	GOES-E (GOES-5)	Weather Satellite	GTO	Success	
1981-08-03; 09:56	Delta 3913	155 (Thor 642)	VAFB, SLC-2W	Explorer 62 / 63 (Dynamics Explorer-A/B)	Magnetosphere research satellites	MEO	Success	
1981-08-10; 20:03	N-II	N-8 (F)	Tanegashima SLC-N	GMS-2 (Himawari-2)	Weather satellite	GTO	Success	
1981-09-24; 23:09	Delta 3910	156 (Thor 641)	CCAFS LC-17A	SBS-2	Communications satellite	GTO	Success	
1981-10-06; 11:27	Delta 2310	157 (Thor 639)	VAFB, SLC-2W	Explorer 64 (Solar Mesosphere Explorer) / Oscar-9	Atmospheric research satellite / amateur radio satellite	LEO	Success	
1981-11-20; 01:37	Delta 3910	158 (Thor 640)	CCAFS LC-17A	Satcom 3R	Communications satellite	GTO	Success	

== 1982 ==
There were 8 Thor missiles launched in 1982. All 8 launches were successful.

Date/Time (UTC)	Rocket	S/N	Launch site	Payload	Function	Orbit	Outcome	Remarks
1982-01-16; 01:54	Delta 3910	159 (Thor 643)	CCAFS LC-17A	Satcom 4	Communications satellite	GTO	Success	
1982-02-26; 00:04	Delta 3910	160 (Thor 644)	CCAFS LC-17A	Westar 4	Communications satellite	GTO	Success	
1982-04-10; 06:47	Delta 3910	161 (Thor 647)	CCAFS LC-17A	Insat 1A	Communications satellite	GTO	Success	
1982-06-09; 00:24	Delta 3910	162 (Thor 649)	CCAFS LC-17A	Westar 5	Communications satellite	GTO	Success	
1982-07-16; 17:59	Delta 3920	163 (Thor 648)	VAFB, SLC-2W	Landsat 4	Earth observation satellite	LEO	Success	
1982-08-26; 23:10	Delta 3920	164 (Thor 651)	CCAFS LC-17B	Anik D1	Communications satellite	GTO	Success	
1982-09-03; 05:00	N-I	N-9 (F)	Tanegashima SLC-N	ETS-3 (Kiku-4)	Technological demonstration satellite	MEO	Success	
1982-10-28; 01:27	Delta 3924	165 (Thor 652)	CCAFS LC-17B	Satcom 5	Communications satellite	GTO	Success	

== 1983 ==
There were 10 Thor missiles launched in 1983. All 10 launches were successful.

Date/Time (UTC)	Rocket	S/N	Launch site	Payload	Function	Orbit	Outcome	Remarks
1983-01-25; 02:17	Delta 3910	166 (Thor 650)	VAFB, SLC-2W	IRAS / PIX-2	Infrared Space telescope / Technological research	LEO	Success	
1983-02-04; 08:37	N-II	N-10 (F)	Tanegashima SLC-N	CS-2A (Sakura-2A)	Communication satellite	GTO	Success	
1983-04-11; 22:39	Delta 3924	167 (Thor 653)	CCAFS LC-17B	Satcom 6	Communications satellite	GTO	Success	
1983-04-28; 22:26	Delta 3914	168	CCAFS LC-17A	GOES-F (GOES-6)	Weather Satellite	GTO	Success	
1983-05-26; 15:18	Delta 3914	169	VAFB, SLC-2W	EXOSAT	X-ray Space telescope	HEO	Success	
1983-06-28; 23:08	Delta 3920	170	CCAFS LC-17B	Galaxy 1	Communications satellite	GTO	Success	
1983-07-28; 22:49	Delta 3920	171	CCAFS LC-17A	Telstar-3A	Communications satellite	GTO	Success	
1983-08-05; 20:29	N-II	N-11 (F)	Tanegashima SLC-N	CS-2B (Sakura-2B)	Communication satellite	GTO	Success	
1983-09-08; 22:52	Delta 3920	172	CCAFS LC-17B	Satcom 7	Communications satellite	GTO	Success	
1983-09-22; 22:16	Delta 3920	173	CCAFS LC-17A	Galaxy 2	Communications satellite	GTO	Success	

== 1984 ==
There were 6 Thor missiles launched in 1984. All 6 launches were successful.

Date/Time (UTC)	Rocket	S/N	Launch site	Payload	Function	Orbit	Outcome	Remarks
1984-01-23; 07:58	N-II	N-12 (F)	Tanegashima SLC-N	BS-2A (Yuri-2A)	Direct-Broadcasting satellite	GTO	Success	
1984-03-01; 17:59	Delta 3920	174	VAFB, SLC-2W	Landsat 5 / Oscar-11	Earth observation satellite / Amateur radio satellite	LEO	Success	
1984-08-02; 20:30	N-II	N-13 (F)	Tanegashima SLC-N	GMS-3 (Himawari-3)	Weather satellite	GTO	Success	
1984-08-16; 14:30	Delta 3924	175	CCAFS LC-17A	Explorer 65 (Active Magnetospheric Particle Tracer Explorers-1/2/3)	Magnetosphere research satellites	HEO	Success	
1984-09-21; 22:18	Delta 3920	176	CCAFS LC-17B	Galaxy-3	Communications satellite	GTO	Success	
1984-11-14; 00:34	Delta 3914	177	CCAFS LC-17A	NATO-3D	Military communications satellite	GTO	Success	

== 1986 ==
There were 4 Thor missiles launched in 1986. 3 of the 4 launches were successful, giving a 75% success rate.

Date/Time (UTC)	Rocket	S/N	Launch site	Payload	Function	Orbit	Outcome	Remarks
1986-02-12; 07:55	N-II	N-14 (F)	Tanegashima SLC-N	BS-2B (Yuri-2B)	Direct-Broadcasting satellite	GTO	Success	
1986-05-03; 22:18	Delta 3914	178	CCAFS LC-17A	GOES-G	Weather Satellite	planned: GTO	Failure	Electric failure in first stage caused the rocket to lose control and was destroyed 90 seconds into flight
1986-08-12; 20:45	H-I	H-15 (F)	Tanegashima SLC-N	EGP (Ajisai) / Oscar 12 / MAEBS	Geodesic research satellite / Amateur radio satellite / Technological demonstration	MEO	Success	
1986-09-05; 15:08	Delta 3920	180	CCAFS LC-17B	Vector Sum Experiment (USA-19)	Experimental on-orbit ASAT test satellite	LEO	Success	

== 1987 ==
There were 4 Thor missiles launched in 1987. All 4 launches were successful.

Date/Time (UTC)	Rocket	S/N	Launch site	Payload	Function	Orbit	Outcome	Remarks
1987-02-19; 01:23	N-II	N-16 (F)	Tanegashima SLC-N	MOS-1 (Momo-1)	Earth observation satellite	LEO / SSO	Success	
1987-02-26; 23:05	Delta 3914	179	CCAFS LC-17A	GOES-H (GOES-7)	Weather Satellite	GTO	Success	
1987-03-20; 22:22	Delta 3920	182	CCAFS LC-17B	Palapa B2P	Communications satellite	GTO	Success	
1987-08-27; 09:20	H-I	H-17 (F)	Tanegashima SLC-N	ETS-5 (Kiku-5)	Experimental communication satellite	GTO	Success	

== 1988 ==
There were 3 Thor missiles launched in 1988. All 3 launches were successful.

Date/Time (UTC)	Rocket	S/N	Launch site	Payload	Function	Orbit	Outcome	Remarks
1988-02-08; 22:07	Delta 3910	181	CCAFS LC-17B	Thrusted Vector Experiment (USA-30)	Experimental on-orbit ASAT test satellite	LEO	Success	
1988-02-19; 10:05	H-I	H-18 (F)	Tanegashima SLC-N	CS-3A (Sakura-3A)	Communication satellite	GTO	Success	
1988-09-16; 09:59	H-I	H-19 (F)	Tanegashima SLC-N	CS-3B (Sakura-3B)	Communication satellite	GTO	Success	

== 1989 ==
There were 9 Thor missiles launched in 1989. All 9 launches were successful.

Date/Time (UTC)	Rocket	S/N	Launch site	Payload	Function	Orbit	Outcome	Remarks
1989-02-14; 18:30	Delta II 6925	184	CCAFS LC-17A	NAVSTAR II-1	GPS Block II navigation satellite	MEO	Success	First Delta II launch
1989-03-24; 21:50	Delta 3920–8	183	CCAFS LC-17B	Delta Star (USA-36)	Experimental on-orbit ASAT test satellite	LEO	Success	
1989-06-10; 22:30	Delta II 6925	185	CCAFS LC-17A	NAVSTAR II-2	GPS Block II navigation satellite	MEO	Success	
1989-08-18; 05:58	Delta II 6925	186	CCAFS LC-17A	NAVSTAR II-3	GPS Block II navigation satellite	MEO	Success	
1989-08-27; 22:59	Delta 4925-8	187	CCAFS LC-17B	BSB-R1 (Marcopolo 1)	Communications satellite	GTO	Success	
1989-09-05; 18:11	H-I	H-20 (F)	Tanegashima SLC-N	GMS-4 (Himawari-4)	Weather satellite	GTO	Success	
1989-10-21; 09:31	Delta II 6925	188	CCAFS LC-17A	NAVSTAR II-4	GPS Block II navigation satellite	MEO	Success	
1989-11-18; 14:34	Delta 5920-8	189	VAFB, SLC-2W	COBE	Cosmology observation satellite	LEO	Success	
1989-12-11; 18:10	Delta II 6925	190	CCAFS LC-17B	NAVSTAR II-5	GPS Block II navigation satellite	MEO	Success	
