= Tanegashima =

Island within Ōsumi Islands

Native name: 種子島
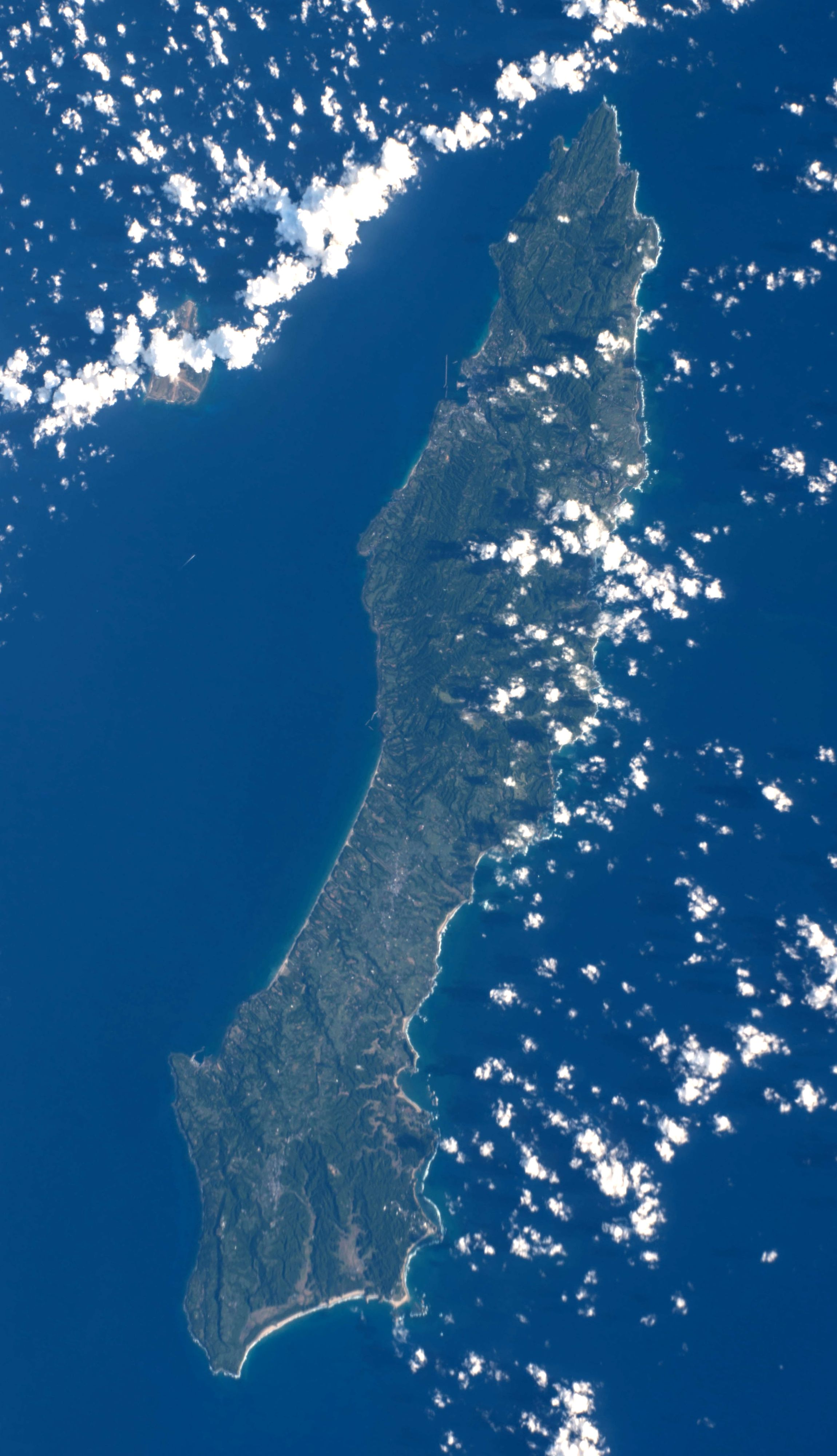
- NASA photo of Tanegashima

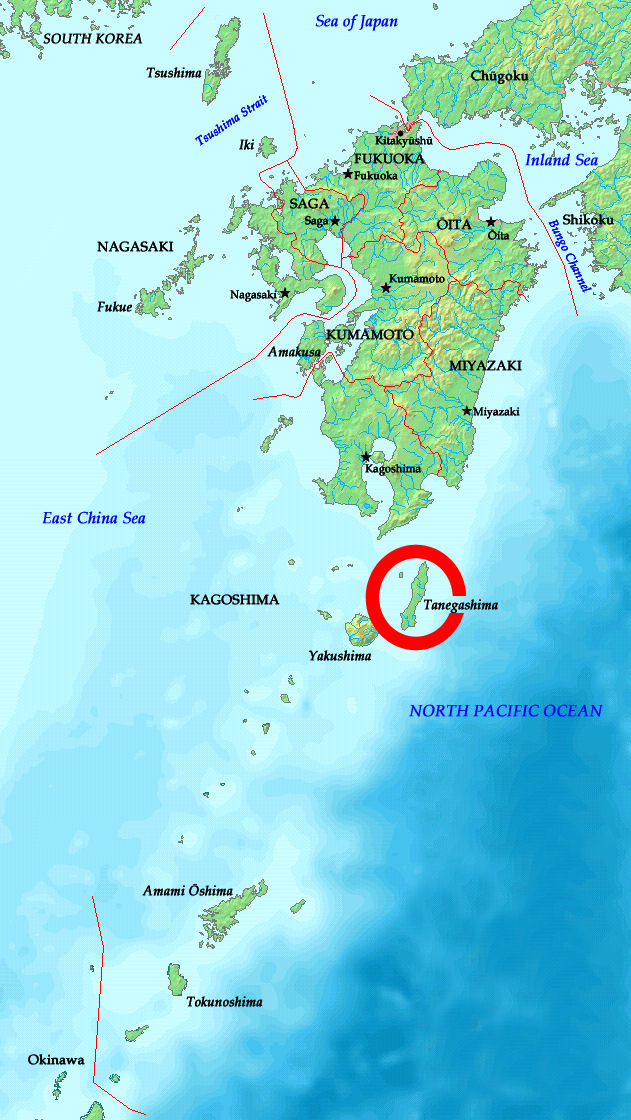
- Tanegashima is the easternmost of the Ōsumi Islands, just south of the major island of Kyushu

Geography
- Location: East China Sea
- Coordinates: 30°34′26″N 130°58′52″E
- Archipelago: Ōsumi Islands
- Area: 444.99 km^{2} (171.81 sq mi)
- Length: 57.2 km (35.54 mi)
- Coastline: 186 km (115.6 mi)
- Highest elevation: 282 m (925 ft)

Administration
- Japan
- Kagoshima Prefecture

Demographics
- Population: 33,000 (2010)
- Pop. density: 74.15/km^{2} (192.05/sq mi)
- Ethnic groups: Japanese

Tanegashima (種子島; Japanese pronunciation: [tä̀.né̞.ɡä́.ɕì.mä̀, tä̀.né̞.ŋä́-, tä́.nè̞.ɡä̀-, tä́.nè̞.ŋä̀-]) is one of the Ōsumi Islands belonging to Kagoshima Prefecture, Japan. The island, 444.99 km^{2} (171.81 sq mi) in area, is the second largest of the Ōsumi Islands, and has a population of 33,000 people. Access to the island is by ferry, or by air to New Tanegashima Airport. Administratively, the island is divided into the city, Nishinoomote, and the two towns, Nakatane and Minamitane. The towns belong to Kumage District.

== History ==
Tanegashima has a long history of Kofun. Other burials on Tanegashima, namely the Yokomine and Hirota sites, attest to a uniquely well-developed Yayoi period culture at the end of the 4th century AD. The artifacts include magatama, an engraved pendant, and emblems with apparent writing.

During the Nara period, the embryo state of Japan began to make contact with Tanegashima. According to the Nihonshoki, the imperial court hosted a banquet for the islanders of Tanegashima in 677. In 679, the court sent a mission to the island who returned in 681. Other missions to the island mentioned in the book were in 683 and 695. According to the Shoku Nihongi, people from Tane, Yaku, Amami and Dokan (possibly Tokunoshima) came to the imperial court to pay tribute in 699. These activities resulted in the establishment of Tane Province on the island in 702. Tane Province lasted until 824 and was merged into Ōsumi Province.

Sometime around 1140, the whole island of Tanegashima became part of the Shimazu Estate, the largest medieval shōen of Japan. In the early Kamakura period, the positions of the land steward of the Shimazu Estate and the military governor of Ōsumi Province were given to the Shimazu clan. However, the clan lost these positions to the Hōjō clan, the de facto ruler of the shogunate. The Hōjō clan sent the Higo clan as deputy governors. A branch line of the Higo clan made itself autonomous on Tanegashima after the Hōjō clan was annihilated and began to claim the clan name of Tanegashima.

The Tanegashima clan ruled the island until the Meiji restoration. The Tanegashima clan enjoyed a high degree of autonomy until Shimazu unified southern Kyūshū in the late 16th century, and after that, served as a top-ranking retainer to the Satsuma domain. Following the Meiji restoration, the island has been administered as part of Kagoshima Prefecture.

=== Introduction of firearms into Japan ===
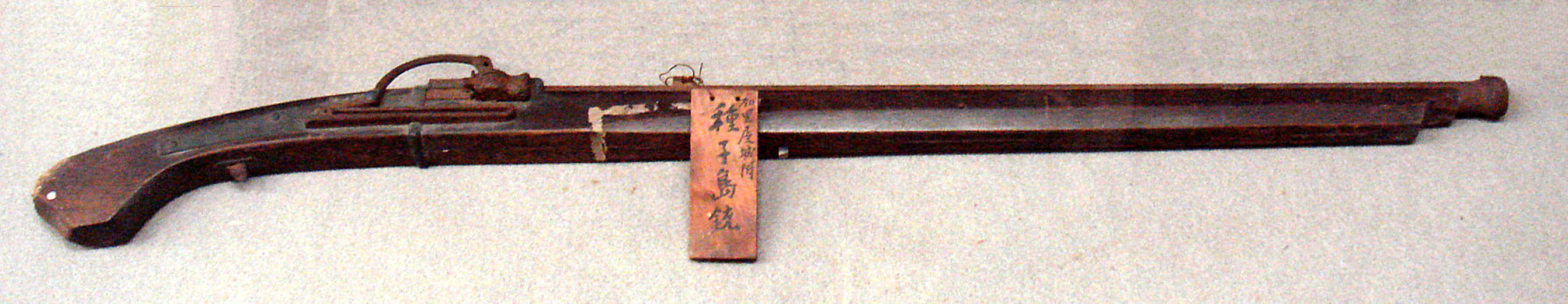
A tanegashima gun

Tanegashima is traditionally known as the site of the introduction of European firearms to Japan in 1543. Until modern times, firearms were colloquially known in Japan as tanegashima, due to the belief that they were introduced by the Portuguese on board the first Portuguese ship.

In his memoirs published in 1614, Portuguese adventurer turned author, Fernão Mendes Pinto placed himself in the first landing party, although this claim has since been roundly discredited and in fact contradicts his claims to have been in Burma at the time. The two Portuguese traders, António Mota and Francisco Zeimoto, should actually be credited as the first Europeans to introduce firearms. However, Mendes Pinto does appear to have visited Tanegashima soon thereafter. The Europeans had arrived to trade, not only guns, but also soap, tobacco and other goods unknown in medieval Japan, for Japanese goods.

During the Muromachi period, Tanegashima functioned as a relay station for one of the main routes of Chinese trade that connected Sakai to Ningbo. The Tanegashima clan cooperated with the Hosokawa clan, one of two powers who controlled Chinese trade. The clan also maintained a firm connection with the Honnō-ji Temple of Kyoto. These account for the rapid spread of firearms from Tanegashima to central Japan.

Gallery

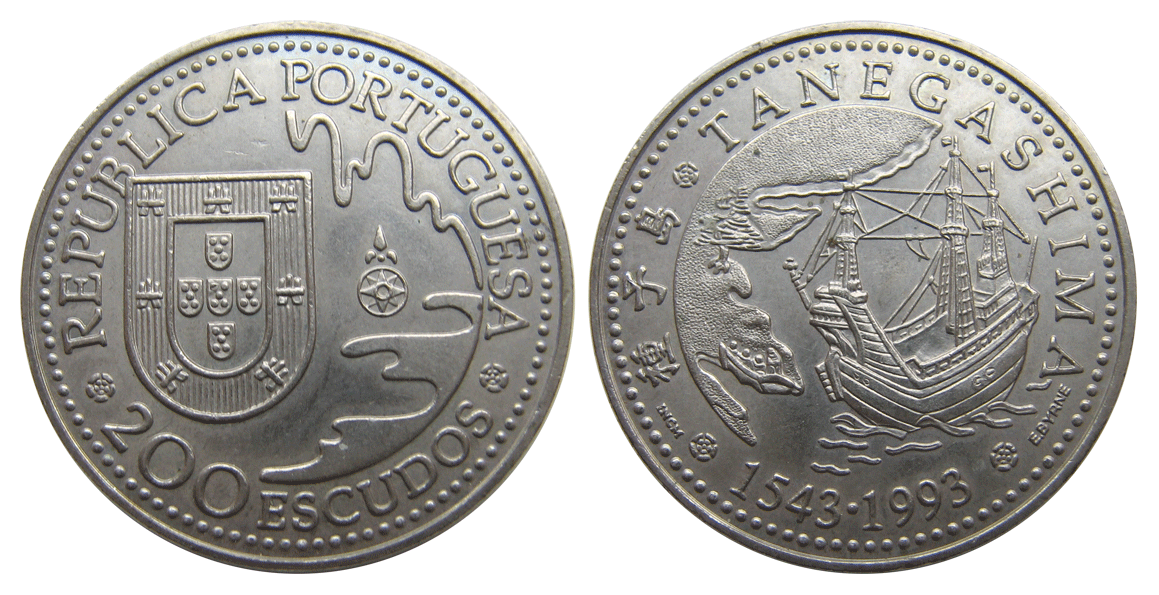
Portuguese escudo commemorating the Portuguese arrival at Tanegashima

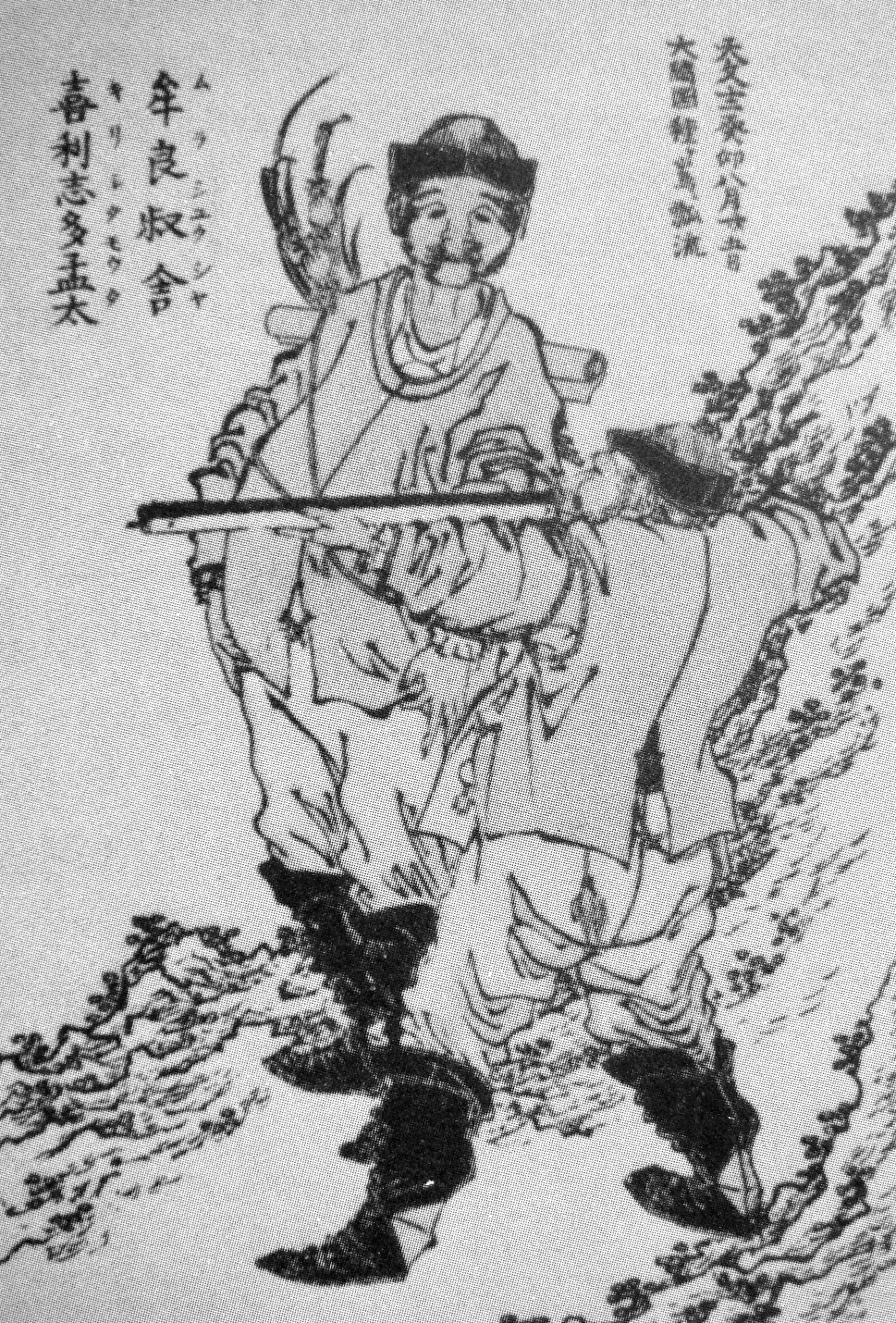
First Westerners in Japan in 1542

=== Knife industry ===
Edge tools (particularly knives and scissors) made in Tanegashima are famous traditional handicrafts in Japan. Craftsmen in Tanegashima have kept alive traditional techniques for forging and sharpening iron tools. Tanegashima is also famous as the center of iron sand production. The technique has been around since about 1185 when the Taira clan were exiled here from Kyoto by Minamoto no Yoritomo, taking with them craftsmen and chefs from Kyoto. The people of the island speak with a Kyoto accent even now, rather than a Kyūshū or Kagoshima accent, despite its proximity to Kyūshū. These craftsmen were the original users of the distinct techniques used for forging and sharpening. The technique is unique in the world, and produces such tools as "Tanegashima Hōchō" (Tanegashima knives), used by chefs, and "Tane-basami" (Tanegashima scissors), preferred by many for the art of bonsai. Nevertheless, the local population has fallen from over fifty thousand in 1970 to just twenty-eight thousand today, in spite of tourism and space industries, putting traditional crafts at risk.

Gallery

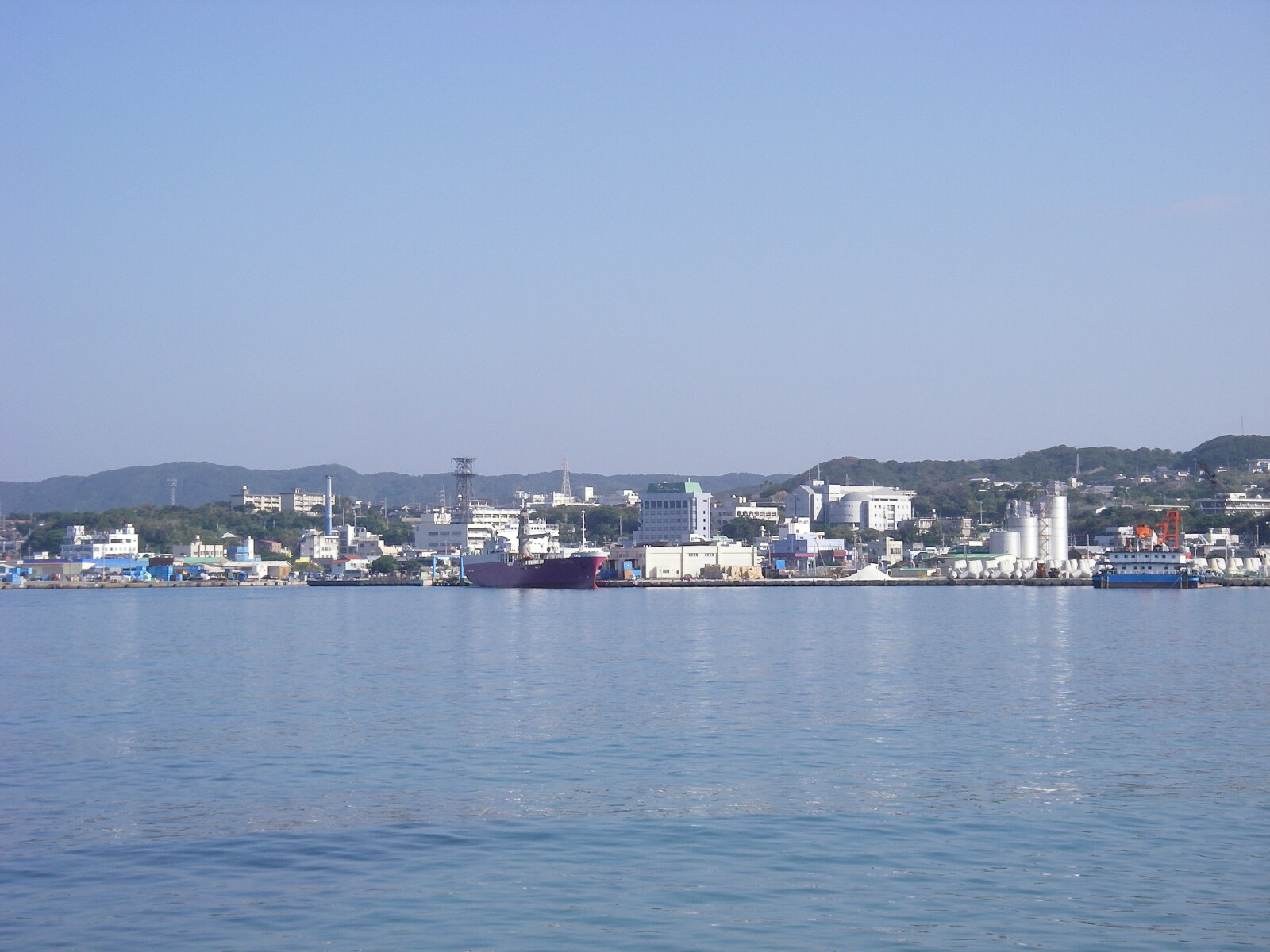
Nishinoomote City on Tanegashima

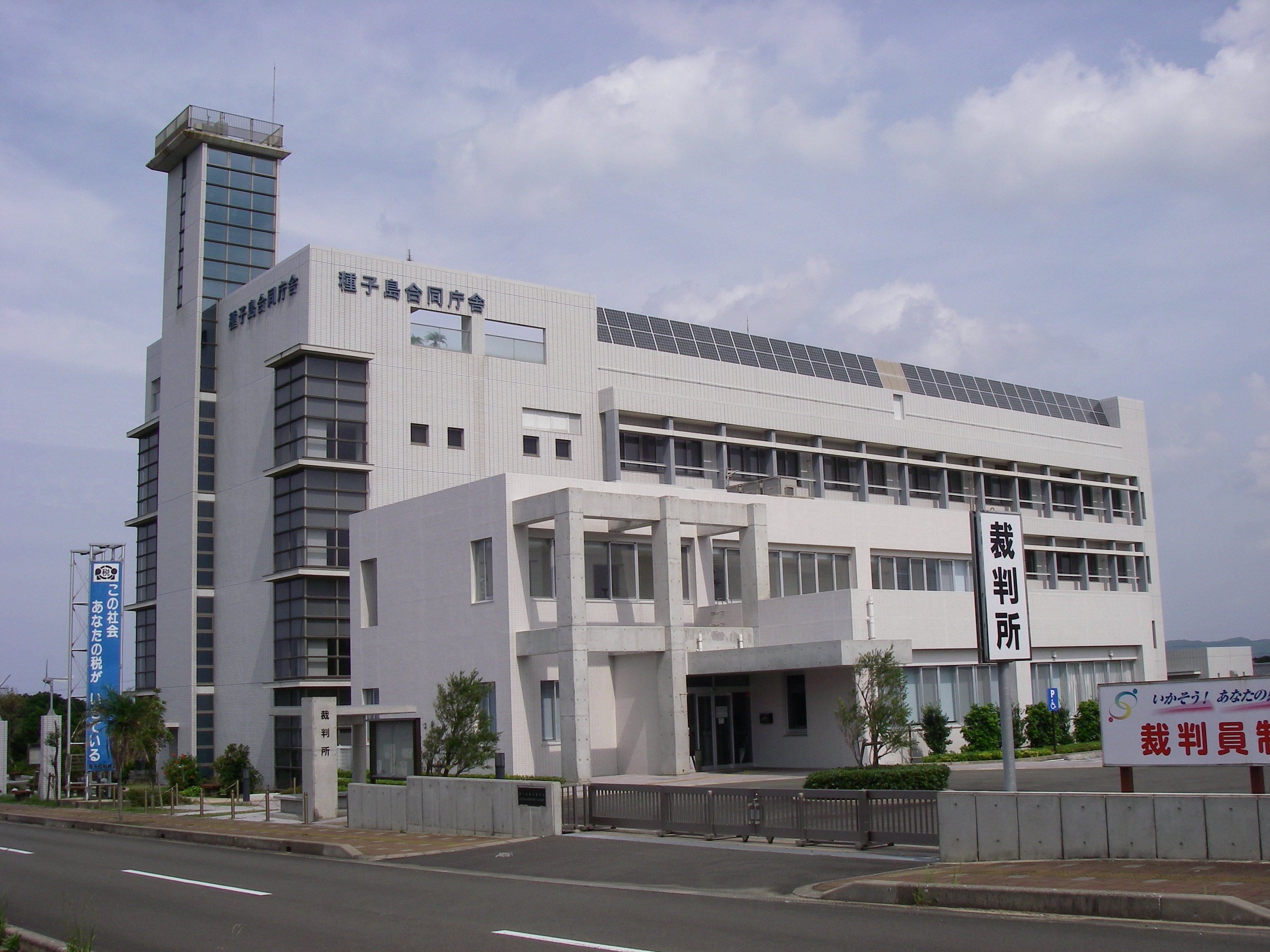
Tanegashima government building

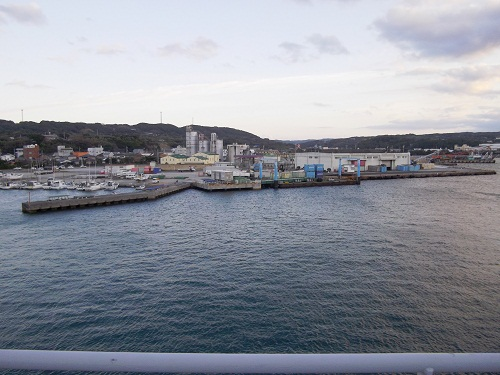
Nishinoomote Minato Ward from "New Satsuma" (mid December 2012)

== Geography ==
Tanegashima is the easternmost and the second largest (after Yakushima) of the Ōsumi Islands. It is located approximately 43 kilometres (23 nmi; 27 mi) south of the southern tip of Ōsumi Peninsula in southern Kyushu, or 115 kilometres (62 nmi; 71 mi) south of Kagoshima. The Vincennes Strait (Yakushima Kaikyō) separates it from Yakushima.

The island is of volcanic origin; however, unlike neighboring Yakushima, it presents a flat appearance, with its highest elevation at only 282 metres (925 ft) above sea level. The island has a length of 57 kilometres (35 mi) and a width ranging from 5 to 10 kilometres (3.1 to 6.2 mi). The climate is subtropical. The island, along with neighbouring Yakushima, has been recognised as an Important Bird Area (IBA) by BirdLife International because they support populations of Japanese wood pigeons, Ryukyu green pigeons and Ryukyu robins.

Gallery

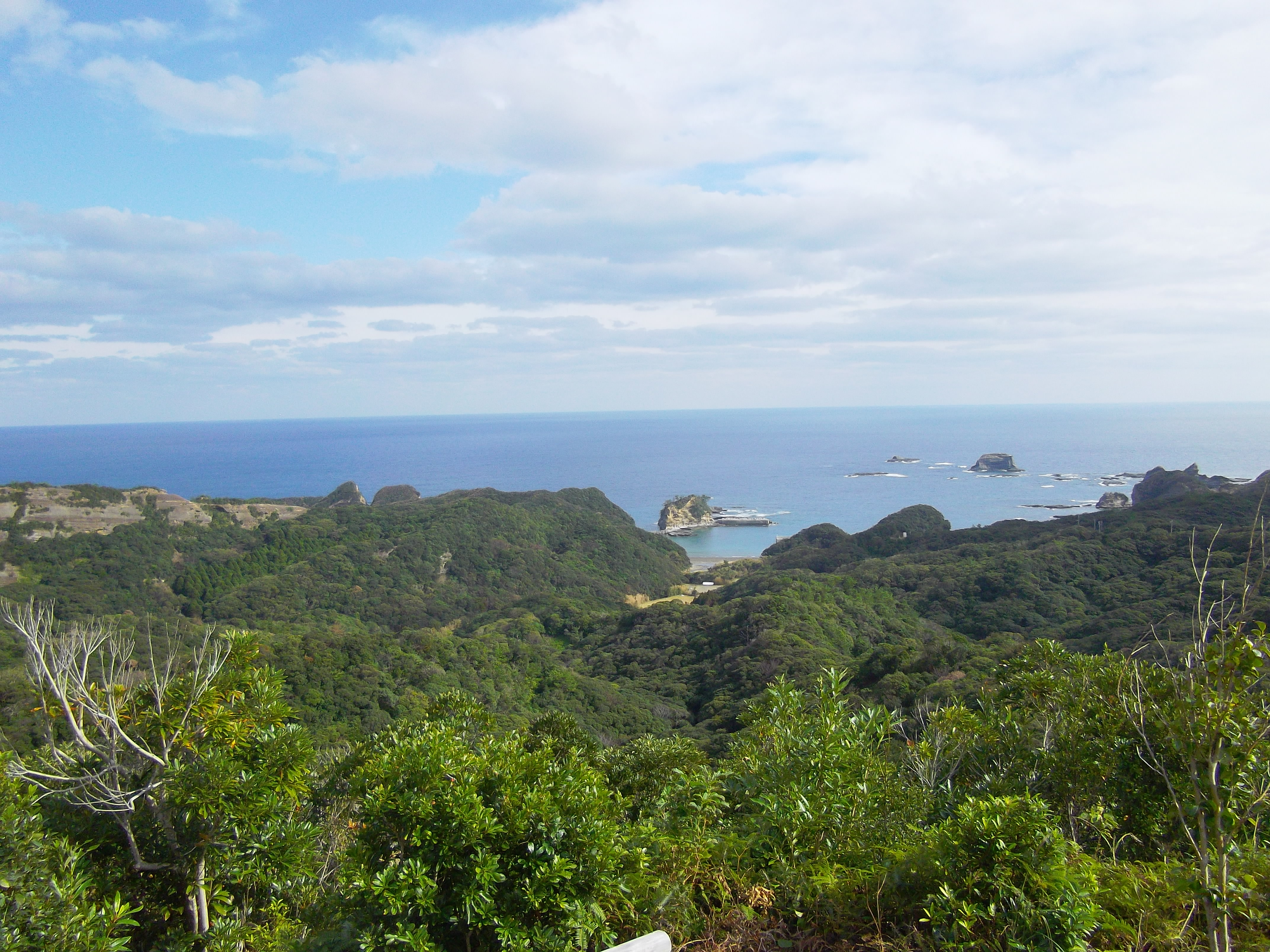
In the vicinity of Inu Castle Coast, Daikoya District

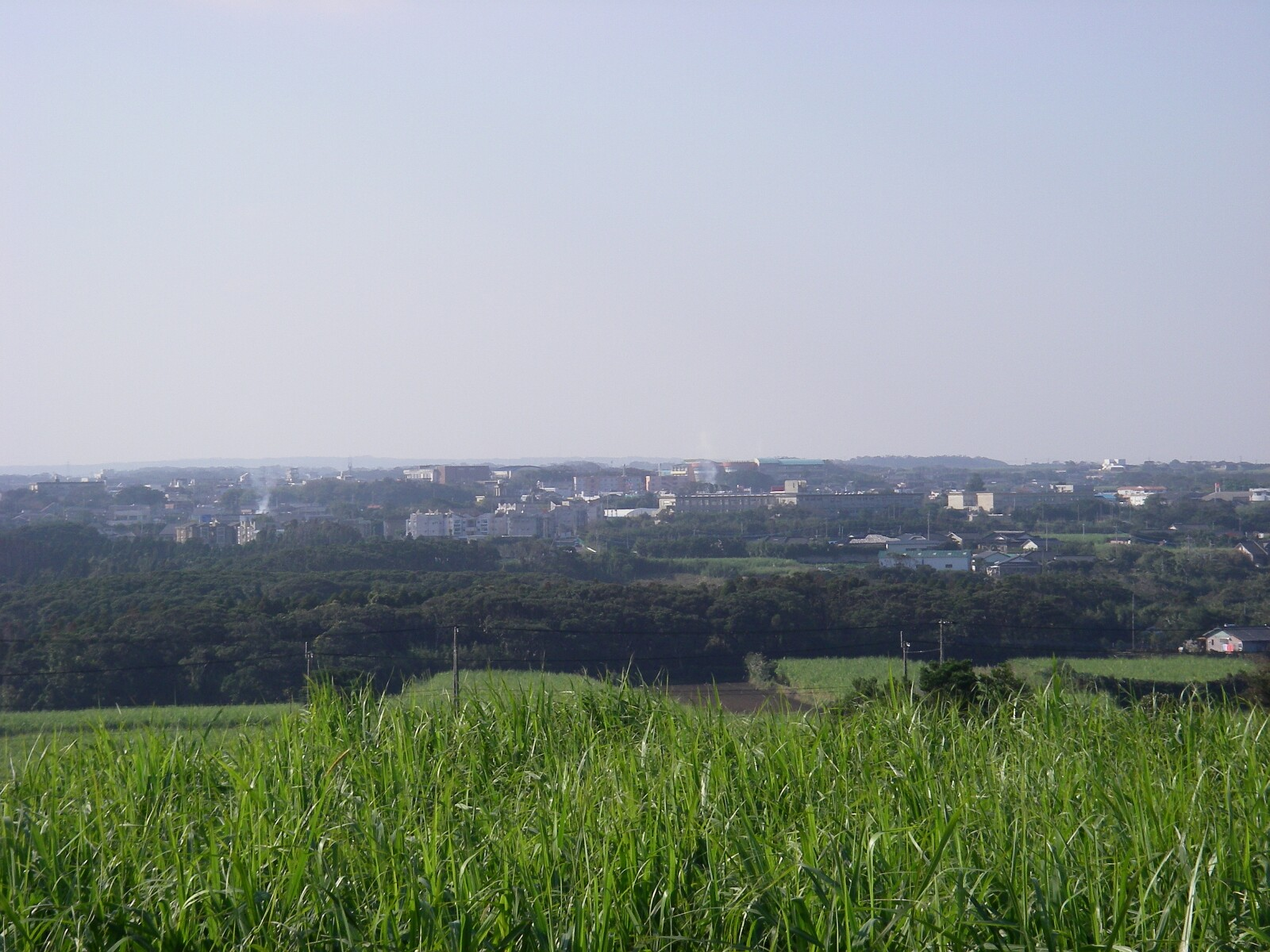
Town area of Nakatane (中種子町), Kagoshima, Japan

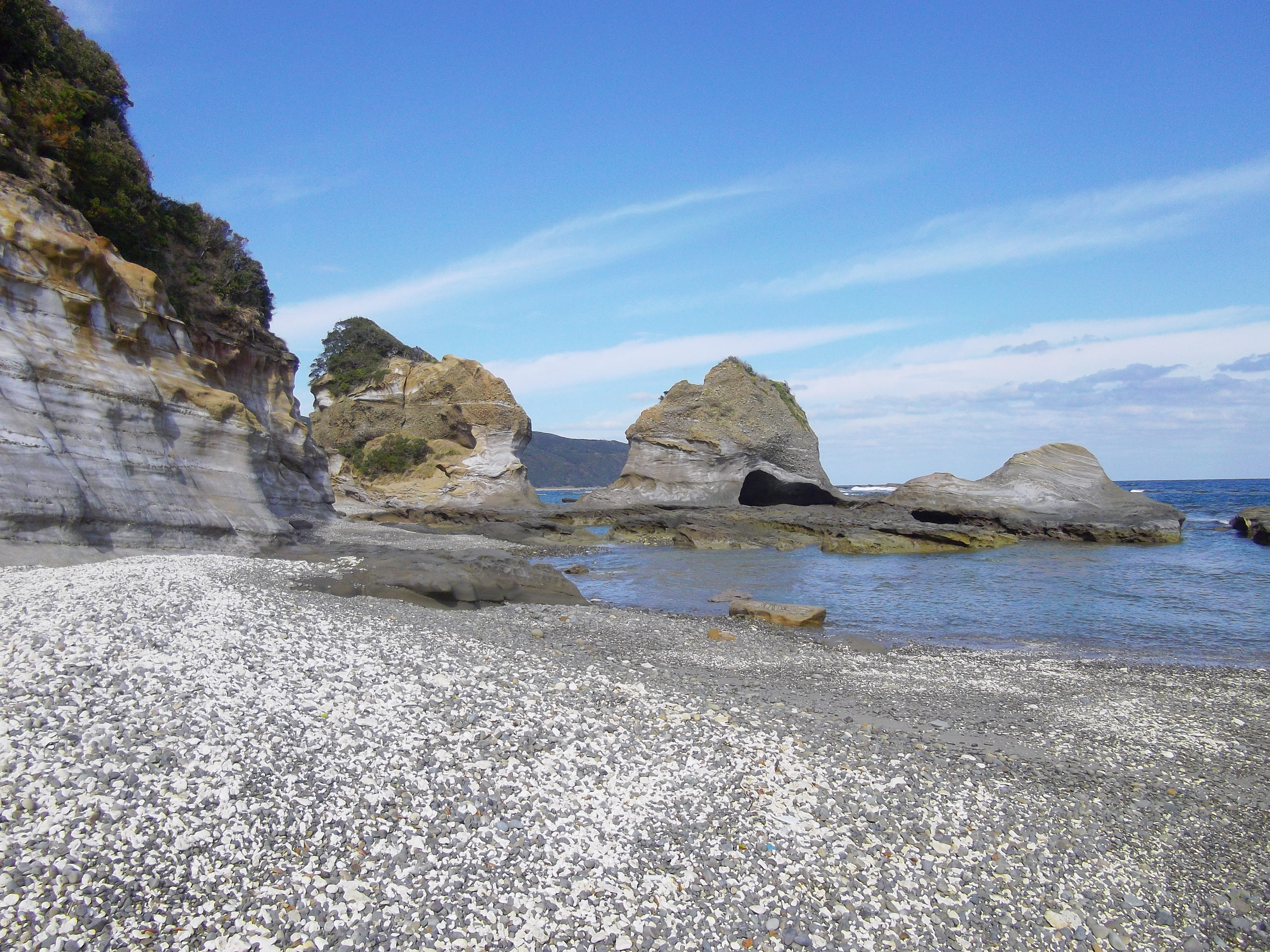
Weathered rocks near Mt. Iwasaki

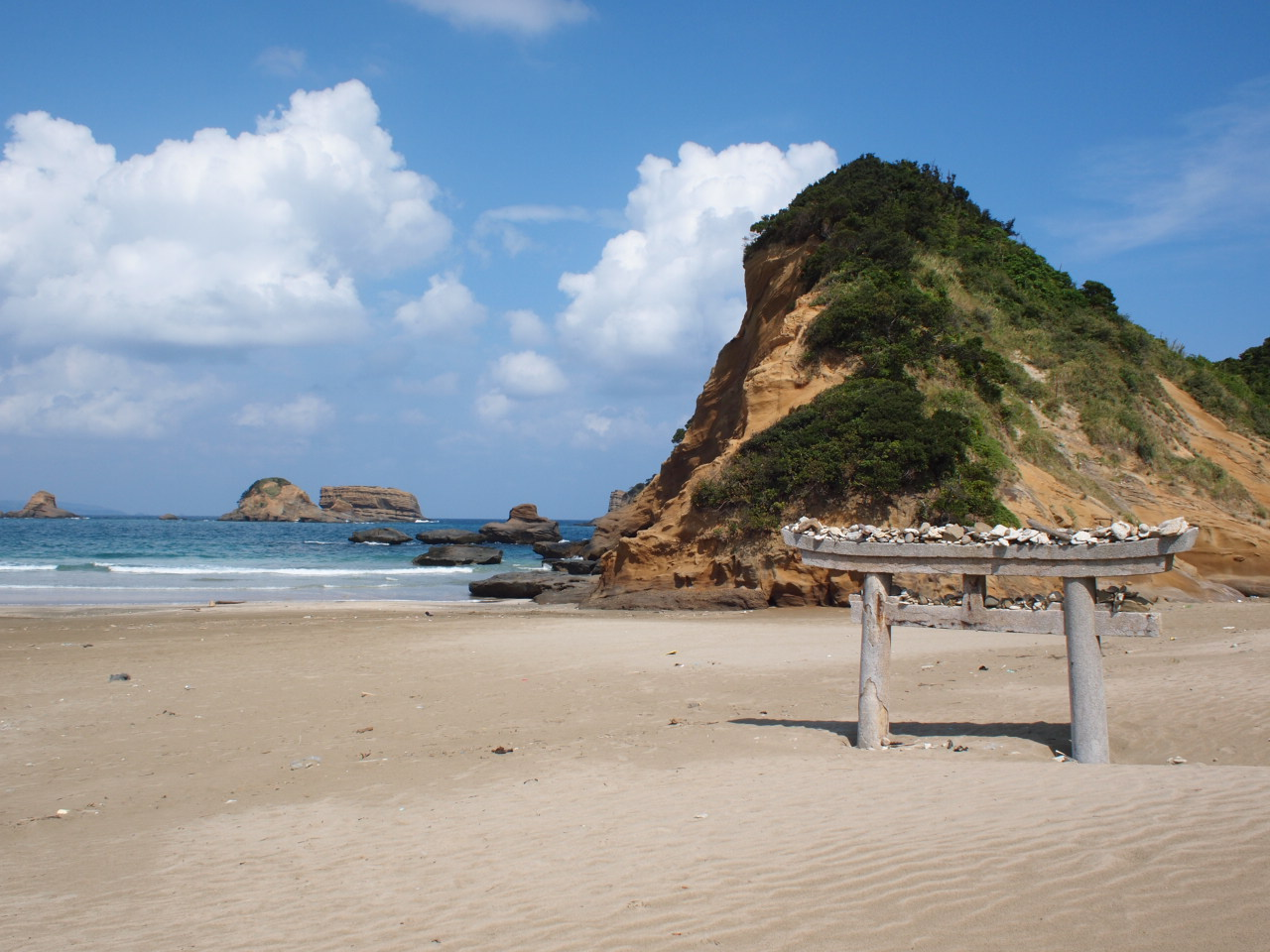
Chikura Caverns

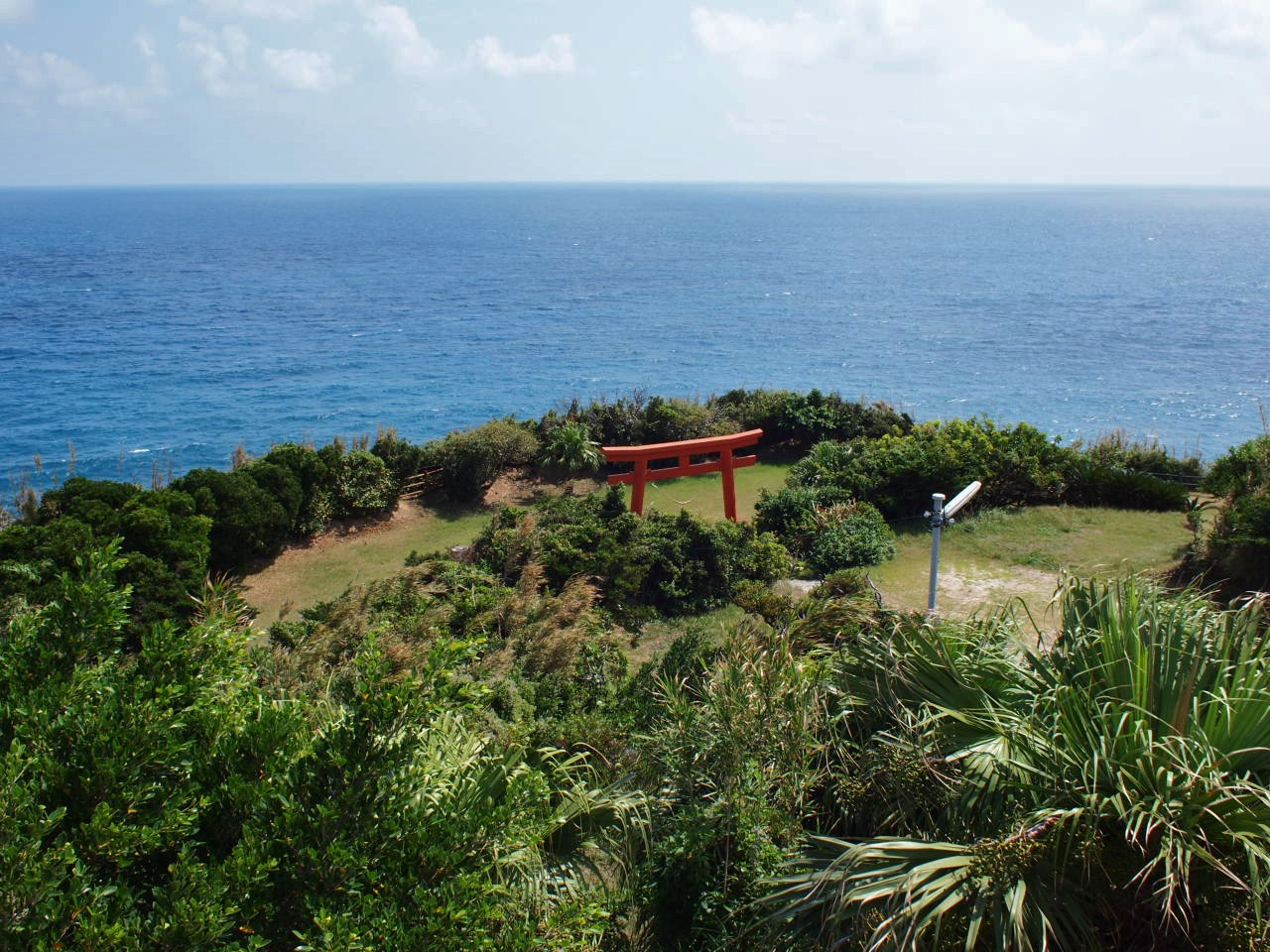
Cape Kadokura

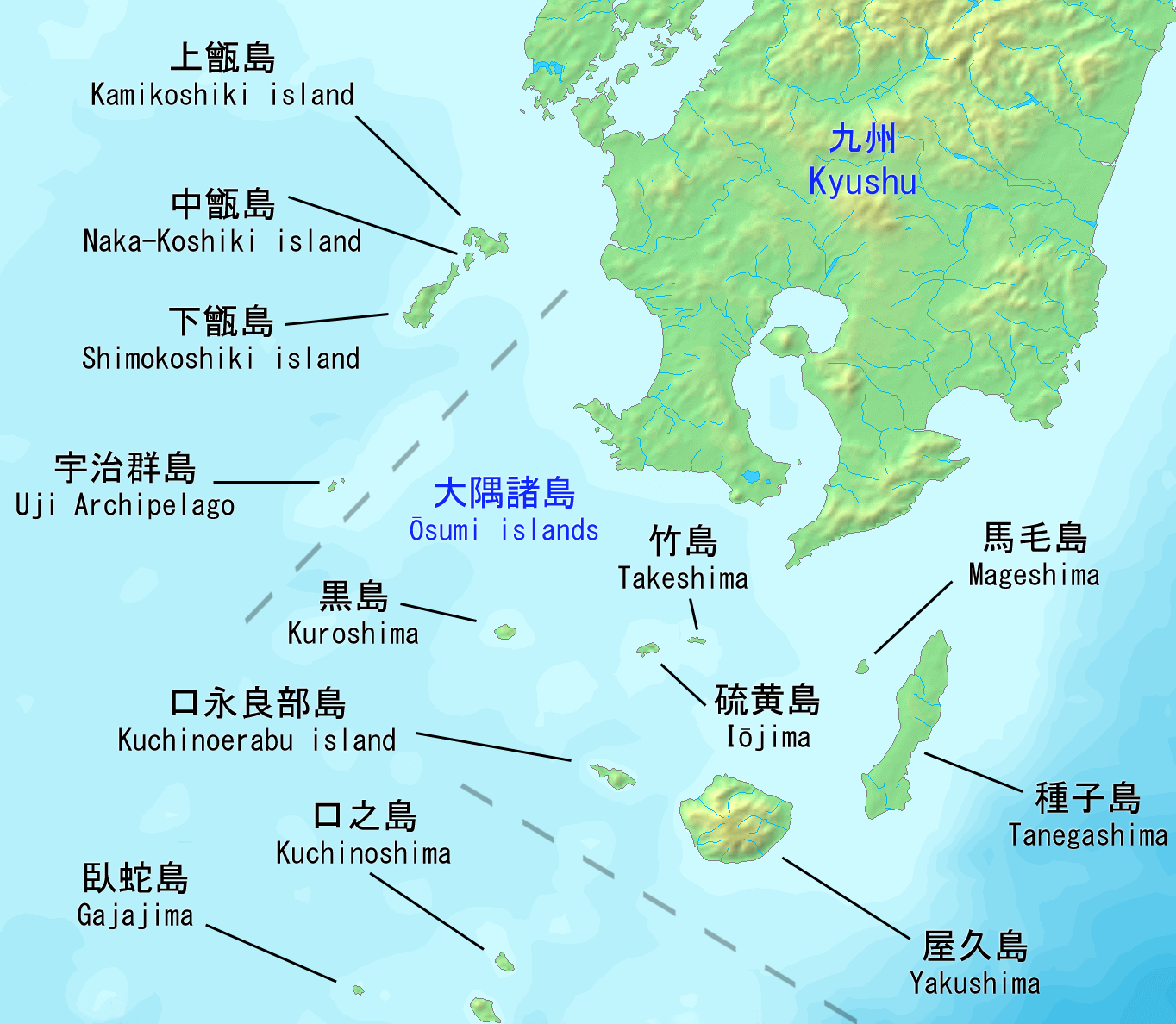
Ōsumi islands map

=== Climate ===
Tanegashima has a humid subtropical climate (Köppen climate classification Cfa) with hot, humid summers and mild winters. Precipitation is high throughout the year, but is highest in the months of May, June and September.

Climate data for Tanegashima (1991–2020 normals, extremes 1948–present)
Month	Jan	Feb	Mar	Apr	May	Jun	Jul	Aug	Sep	Oct	Nov	Dec	Year
Record high °C (°F)	24.4 (75.9)	25.6 (78.1)	26.9 (80.4)	28.1 (82.6)	30.6 (87.1)	33.5 (92.3)	34.9 (94.8)	35.9 (96.6)	34.1 (93.4)	31.3 (88.3)	29.4 (84.9)	27.2 (81.0)	35.9 (96.6)
Mean maximum °C (°F)	20.6 (69.1)	21.7 (71.1)	23.0 (73.4)	25.5 (77.9)	28.1 (82.6)	30.7 (87.3)	32.8 (91.0)	33.2 (91.8)	32.1 (89.8)	29.1 (84.4)	25.9 (78.6)	22.4 (72.3)	33.3 (91.9)
Mean daily maximum °C (°F)	14.2 (57.6)	15.2 (59.4)	17.6 (63.7)	21.0 (69.8)	24.1 (75.4)	26.8 (80.2)	30.4 (86.7)	31.0 (87.8)	29.1 (84.4)	25.1 (77.2)	21.1 (70.0)	16.7 (62.1)	22.7 (72.9)
Daily mean °C (°F)	11.7 (53.1)	12.3 (54.1)	14.5 (58.1)	17.8 (64.0)	21.2 (70.2)	24.0 (75.2)	27.5 (81.5)	28.1 (82.6)	26.2 (79.2)	22.3 (72.1)	18.1 (64.6)	13.8 (56.8)	19.8 (67.6)
Mean daily minimum °C (°F)	8.5 (47.3)	9.0 (48.2)	11.1 (52.0)	14.5 (58.1)	18.1 (64.6)	21.3 (70.3)	25.1 (77.2)	25.7 (78.3)	23.6 (74.5)	19.5 (67.1)	14.9 (58.8)	10.5 (50.9)	16.8 (62.3)
Mean minimum °C (°F)	3.8 (38.8)	4.1 (39.4)	6.1 (43.0)	9.6 (49.3)	13.8 (56.8)	17.9 (64.2)	22.3 (72.1)	23.3 (73.9)	20.0 (68.0)	15.0 (59.0)	9.5 (49.1)	5.2 (41.4)	3.0 (37.4)
Record low °C (°F)	0.0 (32.0)	−0.6 (30.9)	2.1 (35.8)	4.5 (40.1)	10.0 (50.0)	15.2 (59.4)	17.5 (63.5)	20.6 (69.1)	14.9 (58.8)	10.3 (50.5)	4.5 (40.1)	2.6 (36.7)	−0.6 (30.9)
Average precipitation mm (inches)	96.5 (3.80)	122.5 (4.82)	160.4 (6.31)	198.0 (7.80)	233.3 (9.19)	556.4 (21.91)	261.7 (10.30)	188.7 (7.43)	293.2 (11.54)	194.5 (7.66)	134.8 (5.31)	92.7 (3.65)	2,532.5 (99.70)
Average rainy days	9.5	10.3	12.6	10.8	11.1	17.0	9.6	11.0	11.6	9.3	9.2	8.2	130.2
Average relative humidity (%)	65	66	69	71	76	84	83	81	79	73	69	65	73
Mean monthly sunshine hours	107.1	114.9	140.1	163.1	158.5	114.7	222.7	222.8	166.6	157.9	129.7	119.4	1,822
Source 1: JMA
Source 2: JMA

== Tanegashima Space Center ==
The Tanegashima Space Center is Japan's largest space development center. It is run by JAXA, the Japan Aerospace Exploration Agency and is located at the southeastern end of Tanegashima. It was established in 1969 when the National Space Development Agency of Japan (NASDA) was formed. Activities include assembly, testing, launching and tracking satellites, as well as rocket engine firing tests. Orbital launches include the H-II and its siblings in the past, and currently the H3 from the Yoshinobu Launch Complex, and prior to that, the N-I, N-II, J-I and H-I from Osaki Launch Complex.

The Space Science and Technology Museum is near the TSC. It offers an intricate view of rocket history and technology in Japan. Though most of the displays are in Japanese, there are English tour pamphlets available.

Gallery

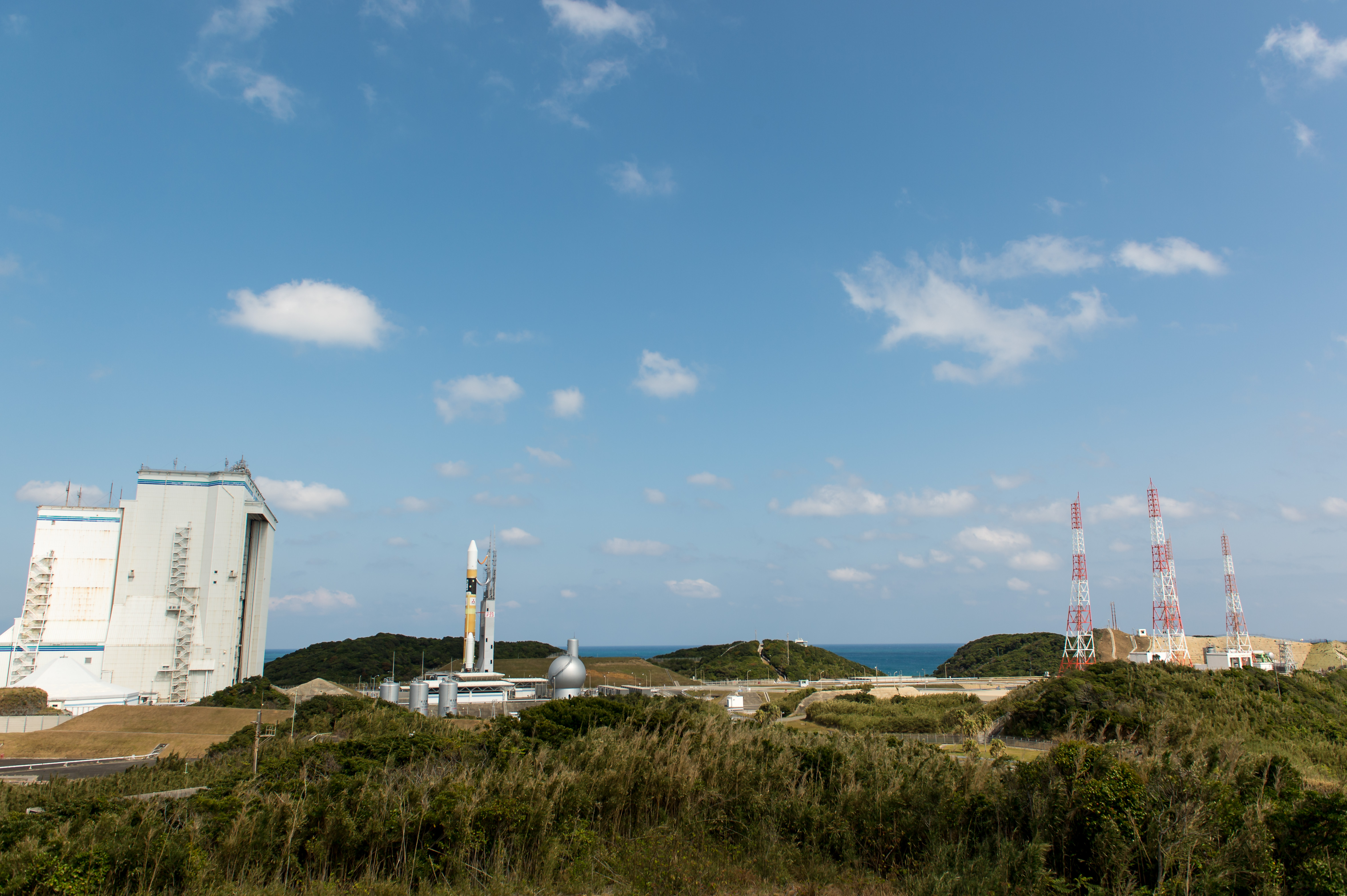
Full view of the Yoshinobu Launch Complex during roll out of the H-IIA rocket in February 2014

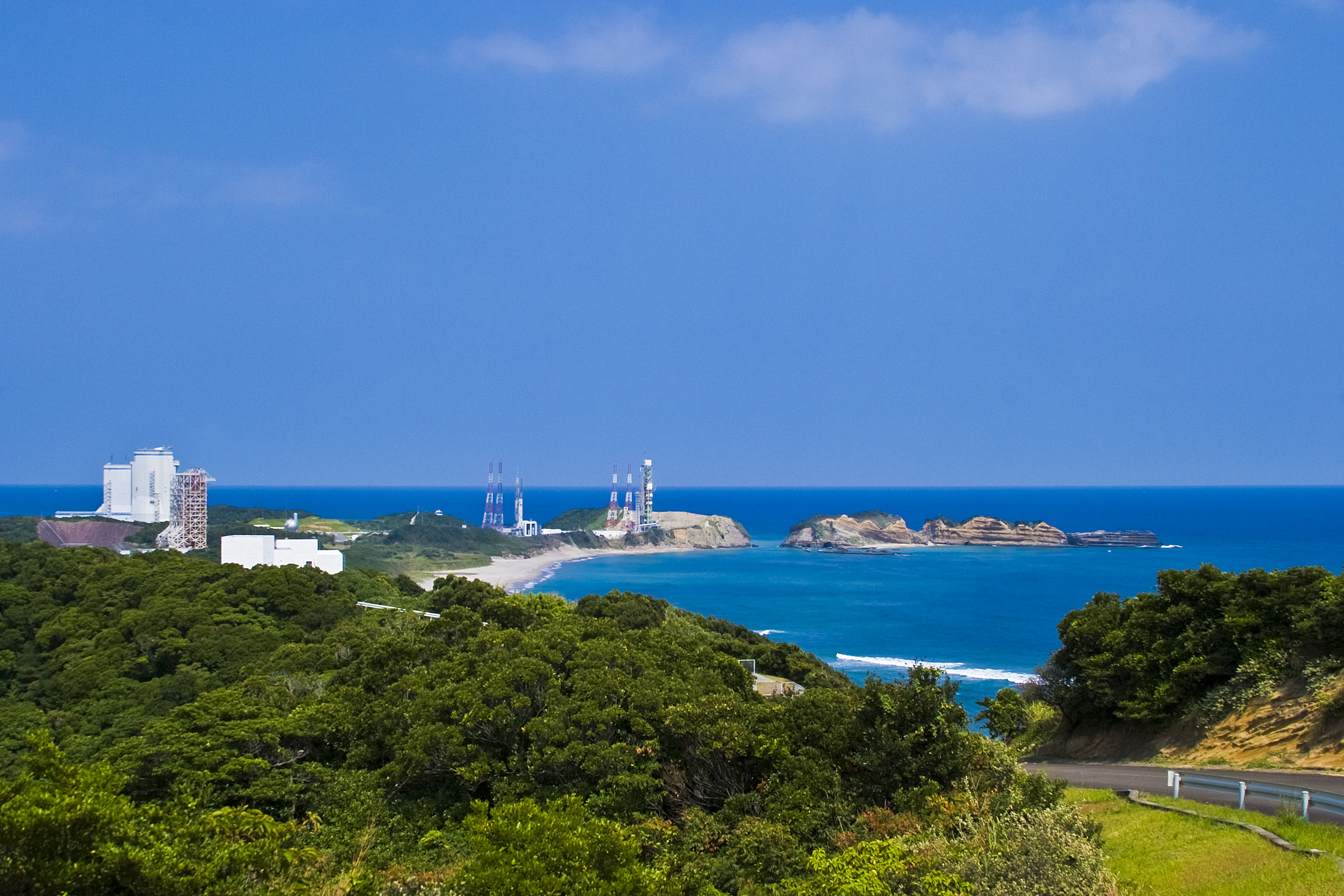
Overlooking the Osaki Range, surrounded by green mountains and the sea of coral reefs.

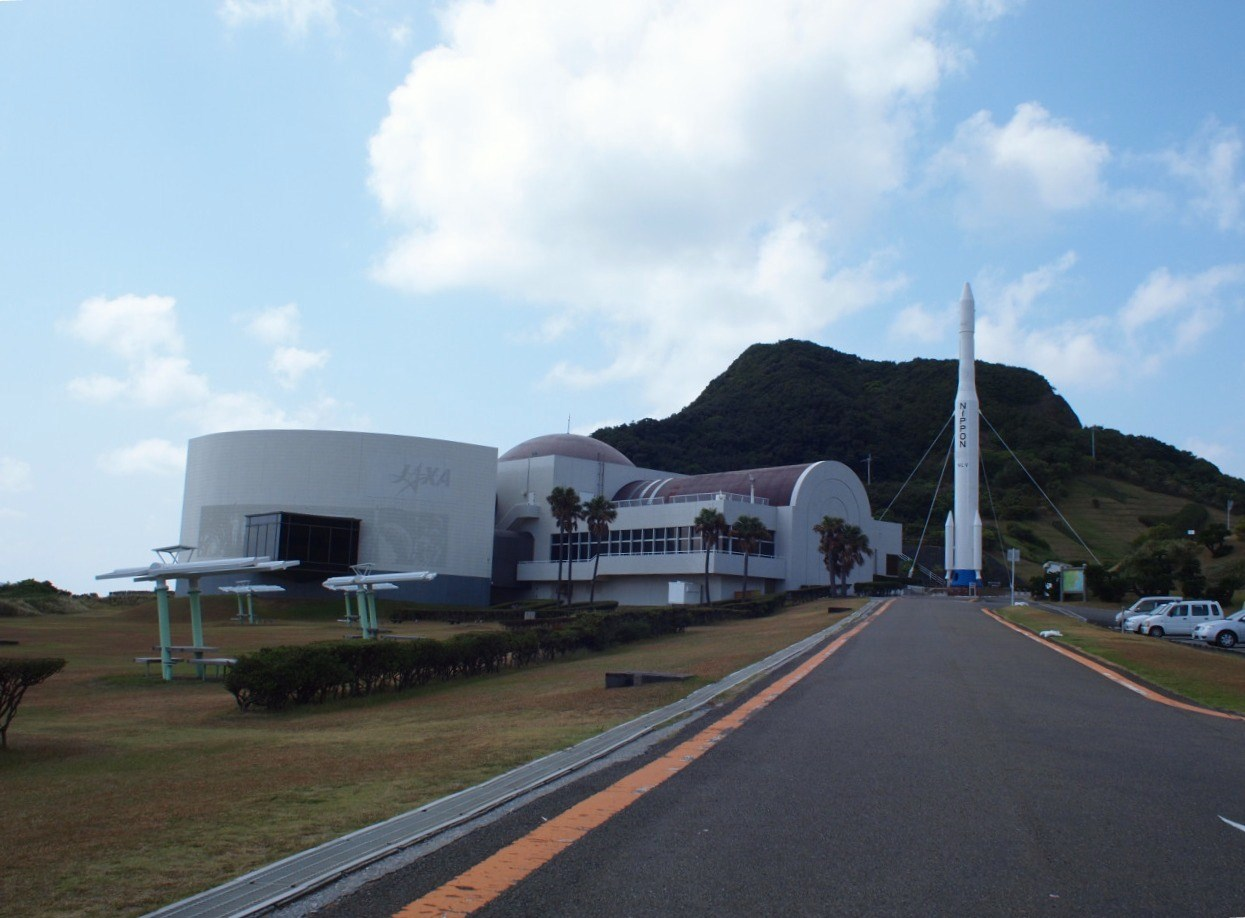
Space Science and Technology Museum

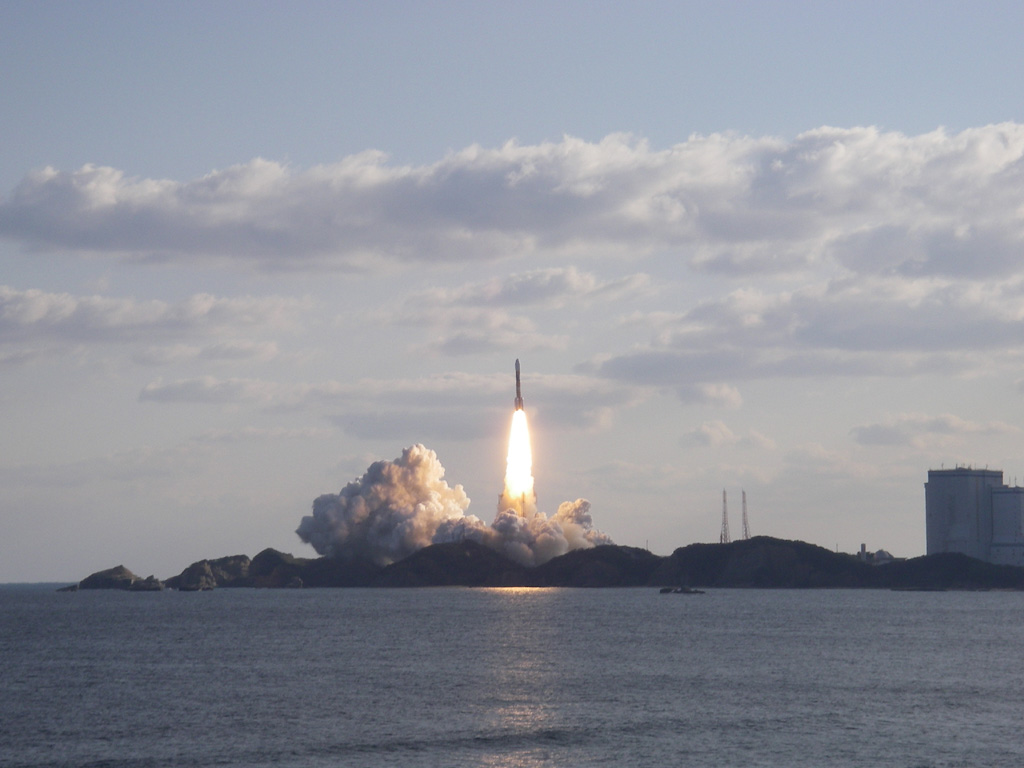
The H-IIA F11 launch vehicle lifting off from Tanegashima Space Center

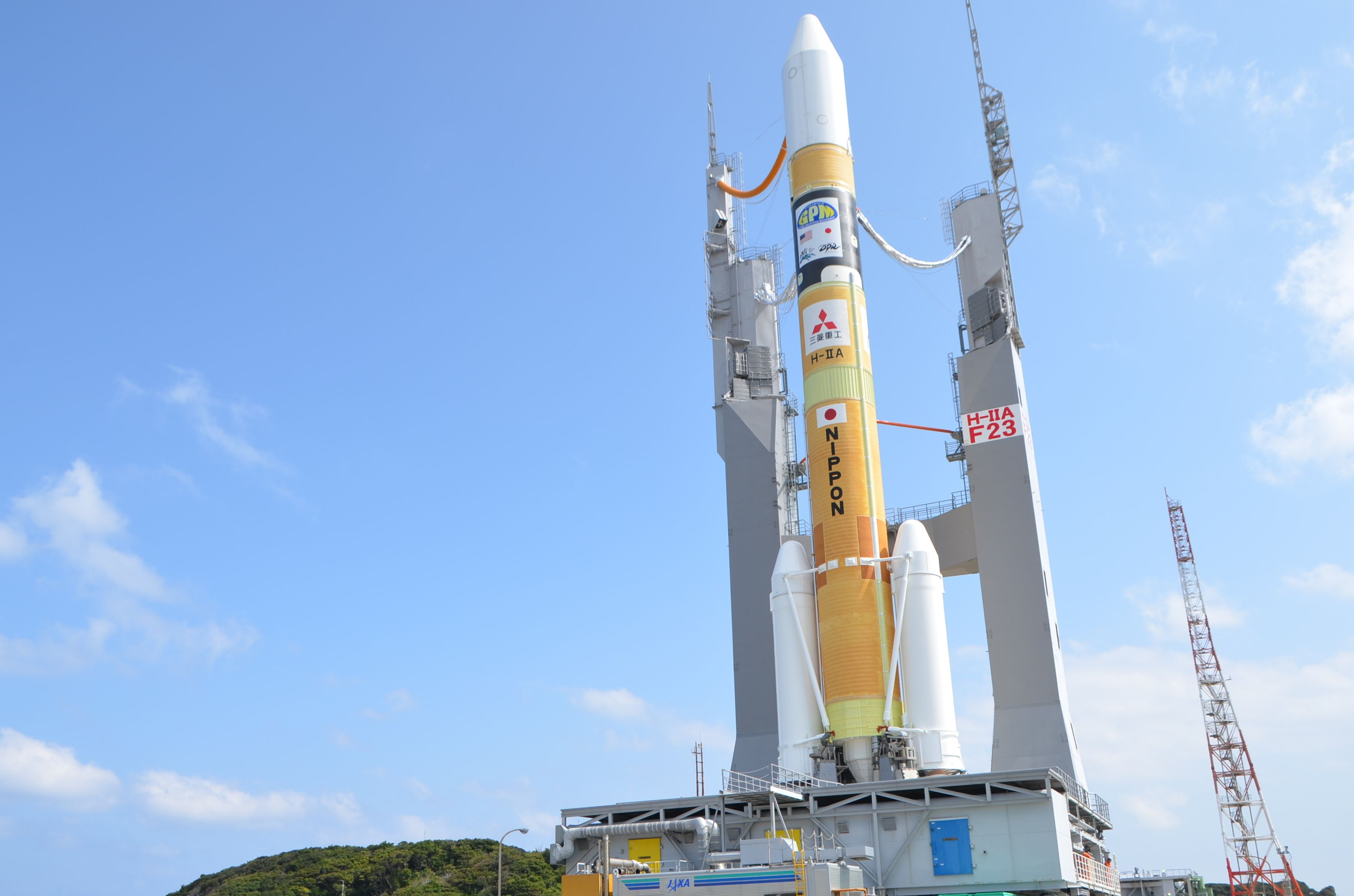
A Mitsubishi Heavy Industries (MHI) H-IIA rocket at TSC

== Sporting events ==
The Tanegashima "Rocket Marathon" takes place in March each year.

== Notable people ==
- Kōbō Kenichi – sumo wrestler
- Wakashimazu Mutsuo – sumo wrestler
- Miyu Uehara – gravure idol and TV personality

== Sources ==
- Lidon, Olof. Tanegashima: The Arrival of Europe in Japan, NIAS Press (2002) ISBN 8791114128.
