= MOS1 =

MOS-1 may refer to:

- the first segment of the Newark–Elizabeth Rail Link, a proposed 8.8-mile (14.2 km)-long light rail line in New Jersey
- MOS-1 (satellite) (Marine Observation Satellite 1), Japan's first Earth observation satellite launched in 1987c&
- Mos 1 transposon (Mosaic element 1), a Tc1/Mariner transposon found in Drosophila mauritiana
