= Ajisai =

Japanese satellite

- Mission type: Geodesy
- Operator: NASDA
- COSPAR ID: 1986-061A
- SATCAT no.: 16908
- Website: https://global.jaxa.jp/projects/sat/egs/
- Mission duration: Elapsed: 40 years, 2 months, 30 days

Start of mission
- Launch date: August 12, 1986, 20:45 GMT (August 13, 1986, 05:45 local time)
- Rocket: H-1 Flight No.1
- Launch site: Tanegashima Space Center
- Contractor: NASDA

Orbital parameters
- Reference system: Geocentric
- Regime: Low Earth orbit
- Periapsis altitude: 1,488 km (925 mi)
- Inclination: 50°
- Period: 116 minutes

Ajisai (Japanese: あじさい, meaning "Hydrangea") is a Japanese satellite sponsored by NASDA, launched in 1986 on the maiden flight of the H-I rocket. It is also known as the Experimental Geodetic Satellite (EGS), as it carries the Experimental Geodetic Payload (EGP).

== History ==
EGP was launched from the Tanegashima Space Center on August 12, 1986 at 20:45 GMT (August 13, 05:45 local time). The launch vehicle was the first H-I rocket. After launch, the spacecraft was given the International Designator 1986-061A and Satellite Catalog Number 16908.

== Structure ==
EGP is entirely passive, and operates by reflecting sunlight or ground-based lasers. The satellite is a 685-kg hollow sphere with a diameter of 2.15 meters, and the surface is covered with 318 mirrors for reflecting sunlight and 1436 corner reflectors for reflecting laser beams. The mirrors are 10x10 inches, and the corner reflectors are one inch in diameter and grouped into 120 laser reflection assemblies.

== Orbit ==
EGS is in a nearly circular orbit at an altitude of approximately 1488 km, close to the (not firmly defined) boundary between low Earth orbit and medium Earth orbit. The orbital period is 116 minutes, and the orbital inclination is 50 degrees.

== Mission ==
EGP's mission is geodesy. The primary objectives were improving Japan's geodetic triangulation network, determining the position of remote islands, and integrating Japan's geodetic network with geodetic systems used in other parts of the world.

There are two modes of operation. A ground-based laser can be reflected off the satellite, and light's return time measured to determine the round-trip distance. Alternatively, when the satellite is in sunlight, it can be photographed against the background stars.

In both cases, since the satellite's orbit is precisely known, information about the ground-based observer's position can be calculated. EGP's orbital altitude is high enough that atmospheric drag has no significant effect on the spacecraft trajectory. This is advantageous for maintaining the stable orbit required for geodesy.

== Visual appearance ==
There is a flash produced when the sun's reflection from one of the satellite's mirrors crosses an observer's position on the earth. Due to the satellite's rotation, and the changing geometry as the satellite moves along its orbit, EGP produces several of these flashes per second. EGP can take up to 18 minutes to cross the sky.

EGP's flashes are visible in binoculars if the observer is on the nighttime side of the planet, and the satellite is in sunlight while its orbital trajectory takes it above the observer's horizon. These conditions are often met in the hours after sunset, and the hours before sunrise. When EGP enters the Earth's shadow, the stream of flashes abruptly ceases.

=== View from Earth ===
The corner reflectors are used to reflect laser beams and are invisible to amateur observers, but the mirrors are spectacular. They are designed to reflect sunlight so the satellite can be photographed by ground stations for precise geodetic surveying measurements. The glints are probably in the third magnitude range but are visible to the naked eye only in very dark skies under good conditions. The brief flashes are too short to be noticed by the naked eye. In binoculars EGP resembles the strobe of an airplane but the flash pattern is more complex than a strobe light. Because of the extremely high orbital altitude of 1,500 kilometres, EGP is often visible closer to midnight than other satellites, and can frequently be seen on as many as four orbits during a single overnight observing session.

== See also ==
- LAGEOS
- Starlette and Stella
- List of passive satellites
- List of laser ranging satellites
