= Osaki Launch Complex =

Japanese launch complex

- Launch site: Tanegashima
- Coordinates: 30.398551°N 130.968644°E
- Operator: NASDA (former); JAXA
- Total launches: 25
- Launch pad(s): 1
Launch history
- Status: Retired
- First launch: 9 September 1975; N-I (Kiku 1)
- Last launch: 11 February 1996; J-I (HYFLEX)
- Associated rockets: N-I, N-II, H-I, J-I

Osaki Launch Complex is a rocket launch site located at the Tanegashima Space Center on the island of Tanegashima.

Initially constructed for the N-I rocket, the complex was subsequently utilized for N-II, H-I and J-I launches.

Constructed in the early 1970s to support N-I rocket launches, the facility underwent modifications in the 1980s to accommodate the N-II and H-I. It underwent extensive renovations in the early 1990s to support the J-I rocket, though the J-I was launched only once before the program's cancellation. In November 1998, the Osaki complex was used for a separation test involving an SRB-A solid rocket booster, which is utilized on the H-IIA launch vehicle.

The Osaki Launch Complex was deactivated in the mid-1990s, with operations shifting to the newer Yoshinobu Launch Complex located to the north.

== See also ==
- List of Yoshinobu Launch Complex launches
