= Yuri (satellite) =

Japanese satellite

Yuri (Japanese: 百合; lit. "lily"), also known as Broadcasting Satellite or BS, was a series of Japanese direct broadcast satellites.

The first satellite of this series, called BSE or Yuri 1, was launched in 1978. The last BS series satellite, BS-3b (Yuri 3b), was launched in 1991.

== Early models ==
The 350 kg (770 lb) BSE was followed in 1984 and 1986 by the operational and essentially identical BS-2a and BS-2b satellites, respectively. Each spacecraft carried two active and one spare 100 W. 14/12 GHz transponder. Built by EURO with assistance from ASR, the BS-2 series satellites were designed for five years of operation. BS-2a was moved to a graveyard orbit in 1989, as was BS-2b in 1992.

== BS satellites ==
BS satellites were used for Direct-To-Home television services in Japan. Japanese satellite television, which uses an analog format, started with test broadcasts carried out by the semigovernmental NHK (Japan Broadcasting Corporation) in 1984. At the time, direct satellite TV reception (DTH) was obtainable with a small parabolic antenna 40 cm to 60 cm in diameter in all areas of Japan when broadcast from a geostationary earth orbit (GEO) at 110 degrees east longitude. All BS satellites were of the same basic configuration: 3-axis stabilization of a rectangular satellite bus with two elongated solar arrays. After the first successful test of satellite broadcasting with a TV signal, many Japanese producers of consumer electronics began to deliver a range of equipment with built-in satellite receivers for the local consumer market. This included the Satellaview satellite modem peripheral for Nintendo's Super Famicom system, as well as satellite television and satellite radio services for the Japanese market.

Eventually, the satellites of the BS series were replaced by the more advanced B-Sat series.

== Satellites ==
Broadcasting Satellites
#	Satellite	NSSDC ID	Launch Date	Launch Site	Rocket	Outcome	Notes
1	BSE	1978-039A	1978-04-07	(United States) Cape Canaveral SLC-17	Delta 2914	Success	Also known as "Yuri 1".
2	BS-2A	1984-005A	1984-01-23	(Japan) Tanegashima	N-2	Success	Two of three transponders failed within three months
3	BS-2B	1986-016A	1986-02-12	(Japan) Tanegashima	N-2	Success	
5	BS-2X		1990-02-22	(France) Kourou	Ariane 44L	Launch failure	Destroyed during launch of Ariane V36.
6	BS-3A	1990-077A	1990-08-28	(Japan) Tanegashima	H-I	Success	
7	BS-3H		1991-04-19	(United States) Cape Canaveral LC-36	Atlas-Centaur	Launch failure	Destroyed during launch of Atlas-Centaur 070.
8	BS-3B	1991-060A	1991-08-25	(Japan) Tanegashima	H-I	Success	
9	BS-3N	1994-040B	1994-07-08	(France) Kourou	Ariane 44L	Success	
