= J-I =

Japanese solid-fueled launch vehicle

J-I

The J-I was a solid-fuel, expendable, small-lift launch vehicle developed by the National Space Development Agency of Japan and the Institute of Space and Astronautical Science. In an attempt to reduce development costs, it used the solid rocket booster from the H-II as the first stage, and the upper stages of the M-3SII. It flew only once on a suborbital flight taking place on 11 February 1996 from the Osaki Launch Complex at the Tanegashima Space Center in a partial configuration, to launch the demonstrator HYFLEX. The vehicle never flew in the final orbital capability configuration, which should have launched the OICETS satellite (OICETS was launched on a Russian R-36MUTTH Intercontinental ballistic missile-based Dnepr rocket instead).

On the HYFLEX mission a load of 1,054 kg was launched 1,300 km downrange. Apogee was 110km; the HYFLEX payload achieved speed of approximately 3.8 km/s.

== See also ==
- Epsilon (rocket)
- Mu (rocket family)
- M-V
- Comparison of orbital launchers families
