= MOS-1 (satellite) =

Japanese Earth observation satellite

Marine Observation Satellite-1
- Names: MOS-1, Momo-1
- Mission type: Earth observation
- Operator: NASDA
- COSPAR ID: 1987-018A
- SATCAT no.: 17527
- Mission duration: Planned: 2 years Final: 8 years, 9 months, 9 days

Spacecraft properties
- Manufacturer: NEC
- Launch mass: 750 kg

Start of mission
- Launch date: 19 February 1987; 01:23:00 UTC
- Rocket: N-II (N-16F)
- Launch site: Tanegashima LC-N
- Contractor: NASDA

End of mission
- Disposal: Decommissioned
- Deactivated: 29 November 1995

Orbital parameters
- Reference system: Geocentric
- Regime: Sun-synchronous
- Perigee altitude: 909 km
- Apogee altitude: 909 km
- Inclination: 99.1°
- Period: 103.2 minutes
Instruments
- MESSR: Multispectral Electronic Self-Scanning Radiometer
- VTIR: Visible and Thermal Infrared Radiometer
- MSR: Microwave Scanning Radiometer
- DCS: Data Collection System

Marine Observation Satellite-1 (MOS-1), also known as Momo-1, was Japan's first Earth observation satellite. It was launched on 19 February 1987 on a N-II rocket from Tanegashima Space Center and was operated by the National Space Development Agency of Japan (NASDA). It is in a polar orbit at roughly 900 km altitude, but was decommissioned on 29 November 1995.

== Instruments ==
It has four instruments:

- "Multi-Spectral Electronic Self-Scanning Radiometer (MESSR)" which offers 50 m resolution in two visible and two infra-red spectral bands over two 100 km swathes.
- "Visible and Thermal Infrared Radiometer (VTIR)" which has a much lower resolution in one visible and three infrared bands over a 1,500 km swathe.
- "Micro Scanning Radiometer (MSR)" which measures microwave emission in the 23 GHz and 31 GHz bands.
- "Data Collection System (DCS)" which is an experimental transponder.
