= N-I (rocket) =

Booster

- The N-I rocket
- Function: Small-lift launch vehicle
- Manufacturer: McDonnell Douglas (design); Mitsubishi Heavy Industries (production)
- Country of origin: United States (design); Japan (production)

Size
- Height: 34 m (112 ft)
- Diameter: 2.44 m (8.0 ft)
- Mass: 131,330 kg (289,530 lb)
- Stages: 2 or 3

Capacity

Payload to LEO
- Mass: 1,200 kg (2,600 lb)

Payload to GTO
- Mass: 360 kg (790 lb)

Associated rockets
- Family: Delta
- Derivative work: N-II

Launch history
- Status: Retired
- Launch sites: Tanegashima, Osaki
- Total launches: 7
- Success(es): 6
- Failure: 1
- First flight: 9 September 1975
- Last flight: 3 September 1982

Boosters – Castor 2
- No. boosters: 3
- Maximum thrust: 258.9 kN (58,200 lb_{f}) each
- Total thrust: 776.7 kN (174,600 lb_{f})
- Specific impulse: 262 s (2.57 km/s)
- Burn time: 37 seconds
- Propellant: Solid

First stage – Thor-ELT
- Powered by: 1 × MB-3-3
- Maximum thrust: 866.7 kN (194,800 lb_{f})
- Specific impulse: 290 s (2.8 km/s)
- Burn time: 270 seconds
- Propellant: RP-1 / LOX

Second stage
- Powered by: 1 × LE-3
- Maximum thrust: 52.9 kN (11,900 lb_{f})
- Specific impulse: 290 s (2.8 km/s)
- Burn time: 246 seconds
- Propellant: N_{2}O_{4} / A-50

Third stage (optional) – Star-37N
- Maximum thrust: 45 kN (10,000 lb_{f})
- Specific impulse: 290 s (2.8 km/s)
- Burn time: 42 seconds
- Propellant: Solid

The N-I or N-1 was a derivative of the American Thor-Delta rocket produced under license in Japan. The "N" stood for "Nippon" (Japan). The vehicle used a Long Tank Thor first stage derived from the PGM-17 Thor intermediate-range ballistic missile, a Mitsubishi Heavy Industries-designed LE-3 engine on the second stage, and three Castor 2 solid rocket motors. An optional third stage, the Star-37N solid motor, was used on three of the seven launches.

Seven N-I rockets were launched between 1975 and 1982, after which the vehicle was replaced by the N-II. Six launches were successful. The fifth flight failed after the payload and third stage collided shortly after separation.

On 29 February 1976, the second N-I launch conducted the only orbital launch on a leap day, as of February 2024.

== Launch history ==
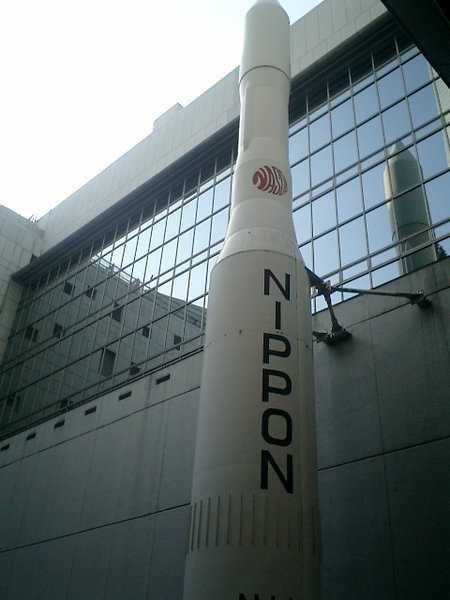
Mock up of N-1

Flight	Date (UTC)	Launch site	Payload	Payload mass	Orbit	Outcome
F1	9 September 1975; 05:30	Tanegashima, Osaki	ETS-I	82.5 kg (182 lb)	LEO	Success
F1	ETS-I (Engineering Test Satellite I, nicknamed Kiku-1) was the first satellite launched by the NASDA. It had the objective of acquiring information on N-series launch vehicles, orbit injection, and tracking and control. It ceased operations on 28 April 1982.					
F2	29 February 1976; 03:30	Tanegashima, Osaki	ISS	139 kg (306 lb)	LEO	Success
F2	ISS (Ionosphere Sounding Satellite, nicknamed UME) was used to monitor radio waves in the ionosphere and forecast conditions for shortwave communications. A power supply issue caused Ume to stop functioning one month after launch.					
F3	23 February 1977; 08:50	Tanegashima, Osaki	ETS-II	130 kg (290 lb)	GTO	Success
F3	3rd stage used. ETS-II (Engineering Test Satellite II, nicknamed Kiku-2) was NASDA's first satellite launched to GEO. It was intended to gather data on geostationary satellite launch, tracking, control, orbit maintenance, and attitude control as well as carrying out experiments on communications equipment. Kiku-2 ceased operations on 10 December 1990, leaving GEO.					
F4	16 February 1978; 04:00	Tanegashima, Osaki	ISS-b	141 kg (311 lb)	LEO	Success
F4	ISS-b (Ionosphere Sounding Satellite b, nicknamed UME-2) had similar goals to the original UME satellite, but was much more successful in carrying them out. While it was originally intended to gather data for only a year and a half, UME-2 ceased operations on 23 February 1983.					
F5	6 February 1979; 08:46	Tanegashima, Osaki	ECS	130 kg (290 lb)	GTO	Failure
F5	3rd stage used. ECS (Experimental Communications Satellite, nicknamed Ayame). Satellite and third stage collided shortly after separation. The satellite had the intention of conducting millimeter wave experiments.					
F6	22 February 1980; 08:35	Tanegashima, Osaki	ECS-b	130 kg (290 lb)	GTO	Success
F6	3rd stage used. ECS-b (Experimental Communications Satellite b, nicknamed Ayame-2). Repeat of the ECS mission. Satellite stopped transmitting shortly after separation.					
F9 (Note: Flights 7 and 8 used the N-II rocket)	3 September 1982; 05:00	Tanegashima, Osaki	ETS-III	385 kg (849 lb)	LEO	Success
F9	ETS-III (Engineering Test Satellite III, nicknamed Kiku-4) was developed to acquire data on designing earth observation satellites with high power requirements. ETS-III completed testing of three-axis attitude control, deployable solar panels, movable heat control, and ion engine operation. On 8 April 1985, the satellite ran out of fuel and ceased operation.					

== See also ==
- Comparison of orbital launchers families
- Delta rocket
- H-I
- H-II
- H-IIA
- N-II (rocket)
- PGM-17 Thor
