= H-I =

Japanese liquid-fuelled carrier rocket

- H-I rocket
- Function: Medium-lift launch vehicle
- Manufacturer: Mitsubishi Heavy Industries (production); McDonnell Douglas (design)
- Country of origin: Japan (production); United States (design)

Size
- Height: 42 m (138 ft)
- Diameter: 2.44 m (8 ft 0 in)
- Mass: 142,260 kg (313,630 lb)
- Stages: 2 or 3

Capacity

Payload to LEO
- Mass: 3,200 kg (7,100 lb)

Payload to GTO
- Mass: 1,100 kg (2,400 lb)

Associated rockets
- Family: Delta
- Based on: N-II
- Derivative work: H-II
- Comparable: Delta 3000, PSLV

Launch history
- Status: Retired
- Launch sites: Tanegashima, Osaki
- Total launches: 9
- Success(es): 9
- First flight: 12 August 1986
- Last flight: 11 February 1992

Boosters – Castor 2
- No. boosters: 6 or 9
- Powered by: 1 × TX-354-3
- Maximum thrust: 258.9 kN (58,200 lb_{f})
- Specific impulse: 262 s (2.57 km/s)
- Burn time: 37 seconds
- Propellant: HTPB/Al

First stage – Thor-ELT
- Powered by: 1 × MB-3-3
- Maximum thrust: 866.7 kN (194,800 lb_{f})
- Specific impulse: 290 s (2.8 km/s)
- Burn time: 270 seconds
- Propellant: RP-1/LOX

Second stage
- Powered by: 1 × LE-5
- Maximum thrust: 102.9 kN (23,100 lb_{f})
- Specific impulse: 450 s (4.4 km/s)
- Burn time: 370 seconds
- Propellant: LH2/LOX

Third stage (optional)
- Powered by: 1 × UM-129A
- Maximum thrust: 77.4 kN (17,400 lb_{f})
- Specific impulse: 291 s (2.85 km/s)
- Burn time: 68 seconds
- Propellant: Solid

The H–I (H–1) was a Japanese medium-lift launch vehicle, consisting of a licence-produced American first stage and set of booster rockets, and all-Japanese upper stages. The H in the name represented the use of liquid hydrogen fuel in the second stage. It was launched nine times between 1986 and 1992. It replaced the N-II, and was subsequently replaced by the H-II, which used the same upper stages with a Japanese first stage.

The first stage of the H–I was a licence-built version of the Thor-ELT, which was originally constructed for the US Delta 1000 rocket. The stage had already been produced under licence in Japan for the N-I and N-II rockets. The second stage was entirely Japanese, using an LE-5 engine, the first rocket engine in Japan to use a cryogenic fuel. On launches to Geosynchronous transfer orbits, a Nissan–built UM-69A solid motor was used as a third stage. Depending on the mass of the payload, either six or nine US Castor 2 SRMs were used as booster rockets.

When the H–1 was announced in 1986, company representative Tsuguo Tatakawe clarified that it would only be used to launch indigenous (i.e. Japanese) payloads, that only two launches per year could be mounted, and that the launch window consisted of a four-month period in which Japanese fishing fleets were not active (the falling launch boosters may damage fishing nets in the ocean waters).

== Launch history ==
Flight	Date (UTC)	Launch site	Payload	Orbit	Outcome
F16 (Note: The flight numbering is a continuation of the series used on the N-I and N-II)	12 August 1986, 20:45	Tanegashima, Osaki	EGP (Ajisai)	LEO	Success
F16	First flight of the H-I launch vehicle.				
F17	27 August 1987, 09:20	Tanegashima, Osaki	ETS-5 (Kiku-5)	GTO	Success
F17	Third stage used.				
F18	19 February 1988, 10:05	Tanegashima, Osaki	CS-3A (Sakura-3A)	GTO	Success
F18	Third stage used.				
F19	16 September 1988, 09:59	Tanegashima, Osaki	CS-3B (Sakura-3B)	GTO	Success
F19	Third stage used.				
F20	5 September 1989, 19:11	Tanegashima, Osaki	GMS-4 (Himawari-4)	GTO	Success
F20	6 SRMs, 3 stages				
F21	7 February 1990, 01:33	Tanegashima, Osaki	MOS-1B (Momo-1B)	LEO	Success
F22	28 August 1990, 09:05	Tanegashima, Osaki	BS-3A (Yuri-3A)	GTO	Success
F22	Third stage used.				
F23	25 August 1991, 08:40	Tanegashima, Osaki	BS-3B (Yuri-3B)	GTO	Success
F23	Third stage used.				
F24	11 February 1992, 01:50	Tanegashima, Osaki	Japanese Earth Resource Satellite (FUYO-1)	LEO	Success

== See also ==
- Delta rocket
- H-II
- H-IIA
- PGM-17 Thor
- Comparison of orbital launchers families
- Comparison of orbital launch systems
