= N-II (rocket) =

Space launch vehicle

- The N-II rocket
- Function: Carrier rocket
- Manufacturer: McDonnell Douglas (design); Mitsubishi Heavy Industries (production)
- Country of origin: United States (design); Japan (production)

Size
- Height: 35 m (114 ft 10 in)
- Diameter: 2.44 m (8 ft 0 in)
- Mass: 132,690 kg (292,530 lb)
- Stages: 2 or 3

Capacity

Payload to LEO
- Mass: 2,000 kg (4,400 lb)

Payload to GTO
- Mass: 730 kg (1,610 lb)

Associated rockets
- Family: Delta
- Based on: N-I
- Derivative work: H-I

Launch history
- Status: Retired
- Launch sites: Tanegashima, Osaki
- Total launches: 8
- Success(es): 8
- First flight: 11 February 1981
- Last flight: 19 February 1987

Boosters – Castor 2
- No. boosters: 9
- Maximum thrust: 258.9 kN (58,200 lb_{f})
- Specific impulse: 262 s (2.57 km/s)
- Burn time: 37 seconds
- Propellant: Solid

First stage – Thor-ELT
- Powered by: 1 × MB-3-3
- Maximum thrust: 866.7 kN (194,800 lb_{f})
- Specific impulse: 290 s (2.8 km/s)
- Burn time: 270 seconds
- Propellant: RP-1 / LOX

Second stage – Delta-F
- Powered by: 1 × AJ-10-118F
- Maximum thrust: 41.3 kN (9,300 lb_{f})
- Specific impulse: 280 s (2.7 km/s)
- Burn time: 335 seconds
- Propellant: HNO_{3} / UDMH

Third stage (optional) – Star-37E
- Maximum thrust: 68 kN (15,000 lb_{f})
- Specific impulse: 284 s (2.79 km/s)
- Burn time: 42 seconds
- Propellant: Solid

Third stage (optional) – Burner II
- Maximum thrust: 43.6 kN (9,800 lb_{f})
- Specific impulse: 285 s (2.79 km/s)
- Burn time: 42 seconds
- Propellant: Solid

The N-II or N-2 was a derivative of the American Delta rocket, produced under licence in Japan. It replaced the N-I-rocket in Japanese use. It used a Thor-ELT first stage, a Delta-F second stage, nine Castor SRMs, and on most flights either a Star-37E or Burner-2 upper stage, identical to the US Delta 0100 series configurations. Eight were launched between 1981 and 1987, before it was replaced by the H-I, which featured Japanese-produced upper stages. All eight launches were successful.

== Launch history ==
Flight	Date (UTC)	Launch site	Payload	Orbit	Outcome
F7 (Note: The flight numbering is a continuation of the series used on the N-I)	11 February 1981; 08:30	Tanegashima, Osaki	ETS-IV	GTO	Success
F7	First flight of the N-II launch vehicle. Payload was ETS-IV (Engineering Test Satellite IV, nicknamed Kiku-3)				
F8	10 August 1981; 20:03	Tanegashima, Osaki	GMS-2 (Himawari-2)	GTO	Success
F10	4 February 1983; 08:37	Tanegashima, Osaki	CS-2A (Sakura-2A)	GTO	Success
F11	5 August 1983; 20:29	Tanegashima, Osaki	CS-2B (Sakura-2B)	GTO	Success
F12	23 January 1984; 07:58	Tanegashima, Osaki	BS-2A (Yuri-2A)	GTO	Success
F13	2 August 1984; 20:30	Tanegashima, Osaki	GMS-3 (Himawari-3)	GTO	Success
F14	12 February 1986; 07:55	Tanegashima, Osaki	BS-2B (Yuri-2B)	GTO	Success
F16	19 February 1987; 01:23	Tanegashima, Osaki	MOS-1 (Momo-1)	LEO	Success

== See also ==
- Comparison of orbital launchers families
- Delta rocket
- H-I
- H-II
- H-IIA
- N-I rocket
- PGM-17 Thor
