= Tanegashima Space Center =

Rocket-launch complex in Japan

- 種子島宇宙センター; Tanegashima Uchū Sentā
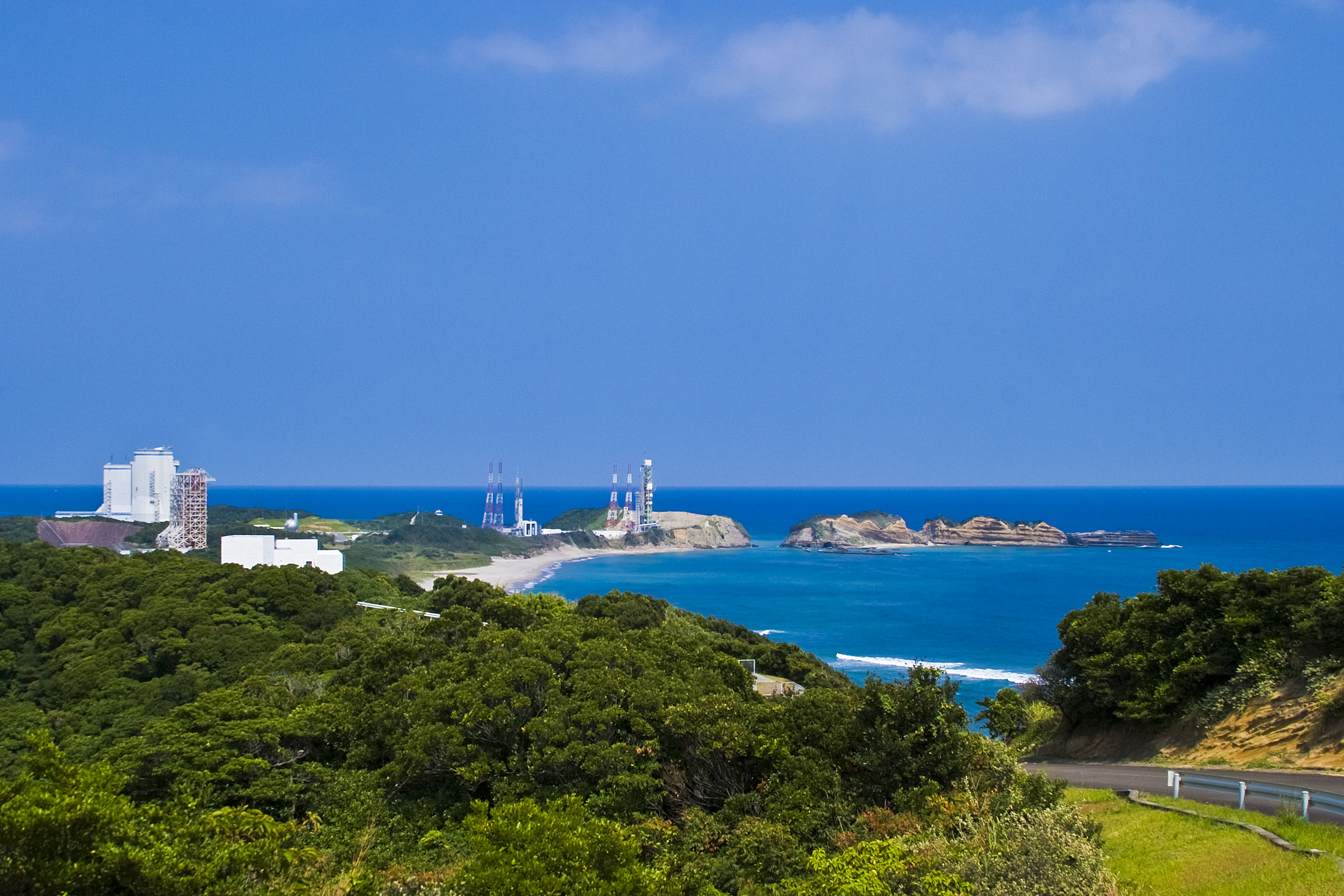
- Osaki range with the Yoshinobu Launch Complex in the distance

Agency overview
- Formed: 1969
- Headquarters: Tanegashima, Japan; 30°24′00″N 130°58′12″E
- Parent agency: JAXA
- Website: global.jaxa.jp/about/centers/tnsc

The Tanegashima Space Center (Note: Japanese: 種子島宇宙センター, Hepburn: Tanegashima Uchū Sentā) (TNSC) is Japan's primary spaceport, covering approximately about 9.7 million square metres (2,400 acres; 970 ha). It is located on the southeastern tip of Tanegashima, the easternmost of the Ōsumi Islands, approximately 40 kilometers (25 mi) south of the major island of Kyushu.

The site was selected on May 24, 1966, and construction began later that year on September 17. Exactly two years later, on September 17, 1968, it hosted its first launch, a small rocket. The facility officially opened on October 1, 1969, coinciding with the establishment of its initial operator, the National Space Development Agency of Japan (NASDA).

Now operated by the Japan Aerospace Exploration Agency (JAXA) since its formation in 2003, TNSC is responsible for satellite assembly, as well as launch vehicle testing, launching, and tracking.

== Facilities ==
On-site main facilities include:

- Takesaki Range – for sounding rockets.
- Osaki Launch Complex – for small-lift launch vehicles. Currently inactive after supporting 25 launches from 1975 to 1996 of the N-I, N-II, H-I and J-I rockets.
- Yoshinobu Launch Complex – for medium-lift launch vehicles
  - Vehicle Assembly Building (VAB)
  - LA-Y1 – launch pad previously used for H-II and H-IIA launches, planned to support H3 in the future
  - LA-Y2 – used for H3 launches, previously used for H-IIB launches
  - Yoshinobu Block House
  - Yoshinobu Firing Test Stand – used for testing liquid fueled engines, currently supporting testing of LE-9
- Spacecraft Test and Assembly Building
- Spacecraft and Fairing Assembly Building
- Second Spacecraft Test and Assembly Building
- Takesaki Range Control Center (RCC)
- Takesaki Launch Control Center (LCC)
- Takesaki Static Firing Test Facility for Solid Motor – used for testing solid fuel motors, currently supporting testing of SRB-3

Those facilities are used for performing operations from assembling launch vehicles, maintenance, inspections, final checks of satellites, loading satellites onto launch vehicles, rocket launches, and tracking launch vehicles after liftoff. The TNSC plays a pivotal role in satellite launches among Japan's space development activities. The Space Science and Technology Museum is near TNSC. It offers a view of rocket history and technology in Japan.

== Gallery ==
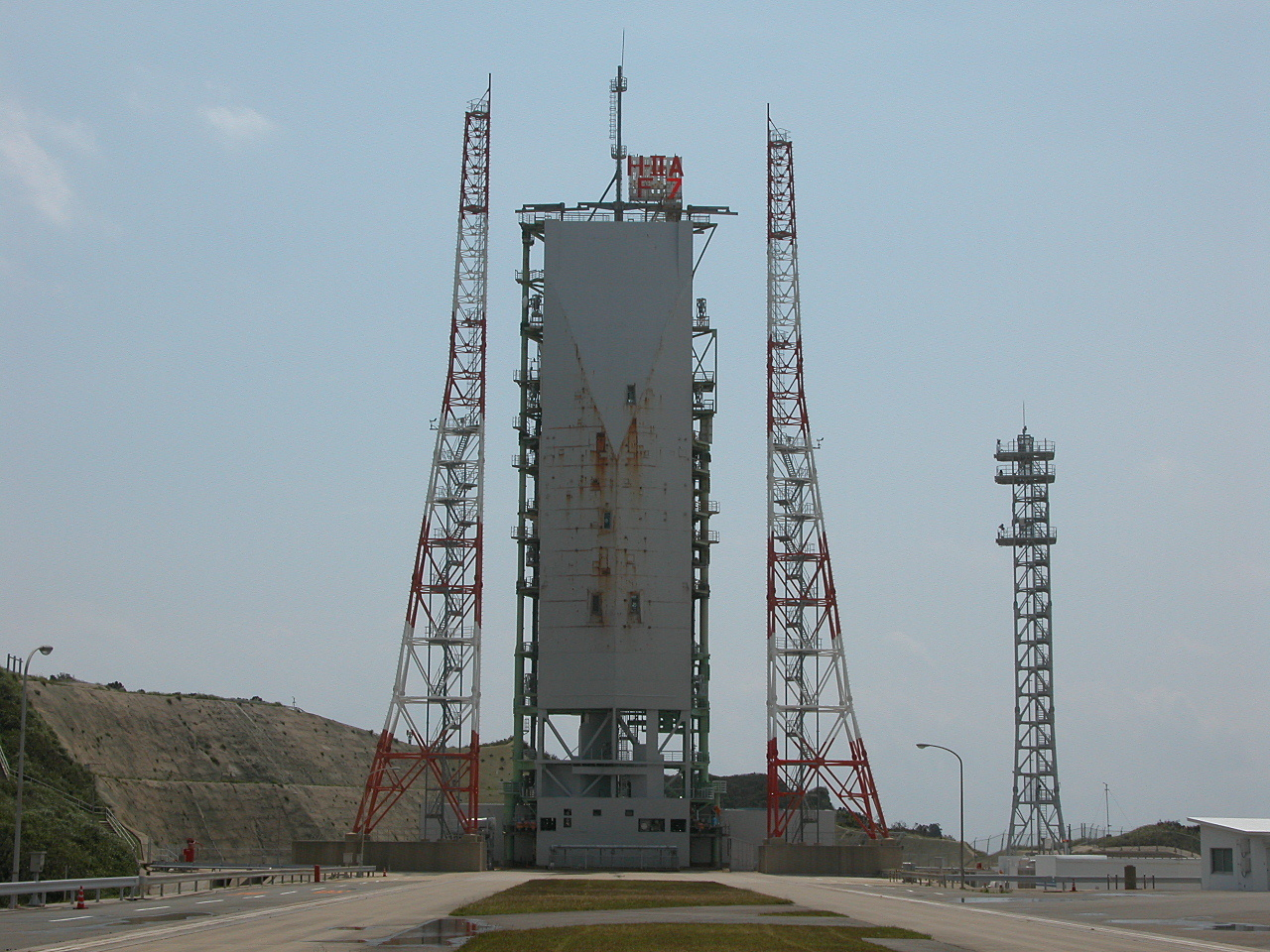
Yoshinobu LA-Y1

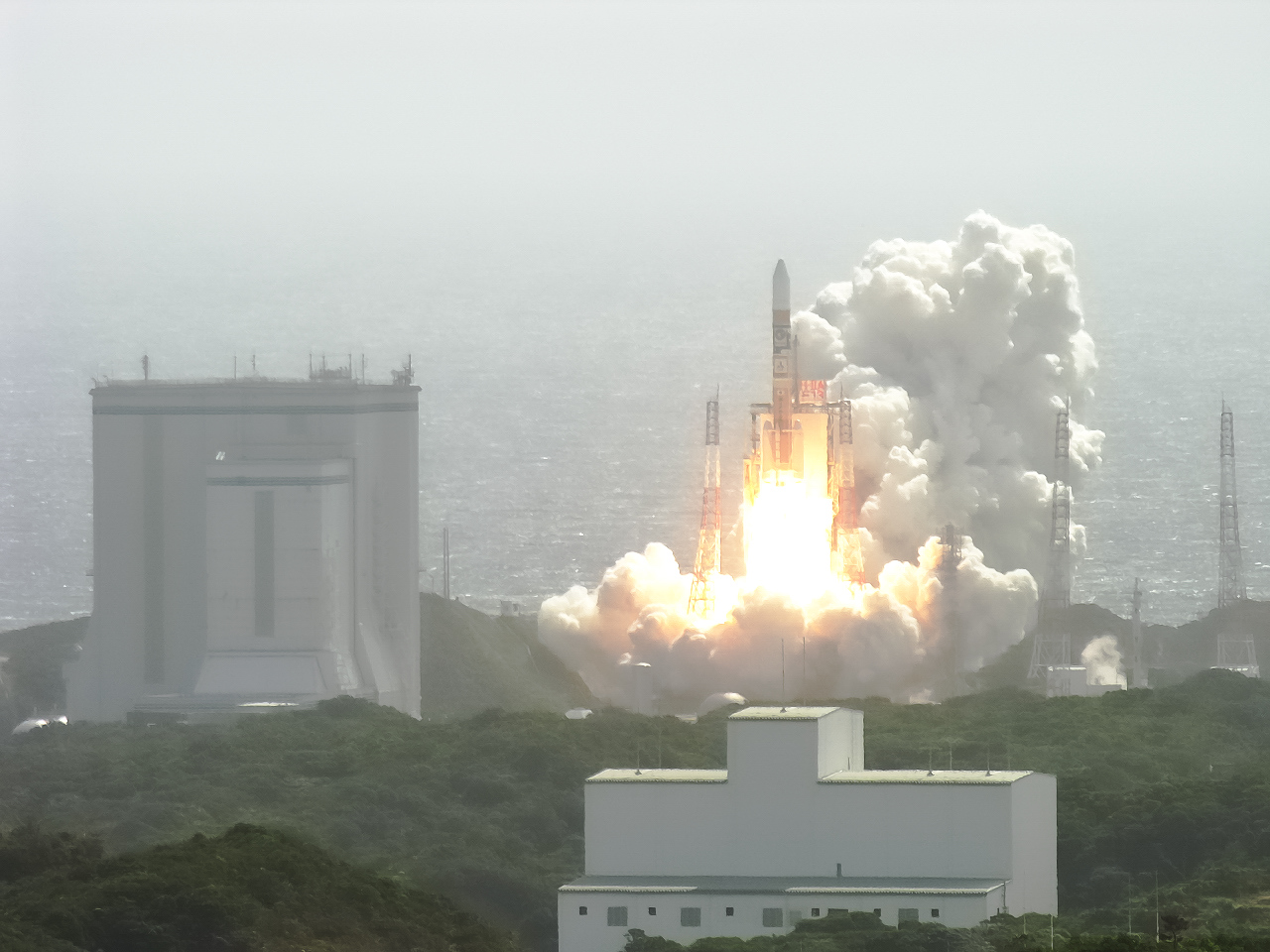
H-IIA Flight 13 (Kaguya) launch from LA-Y1, 2007

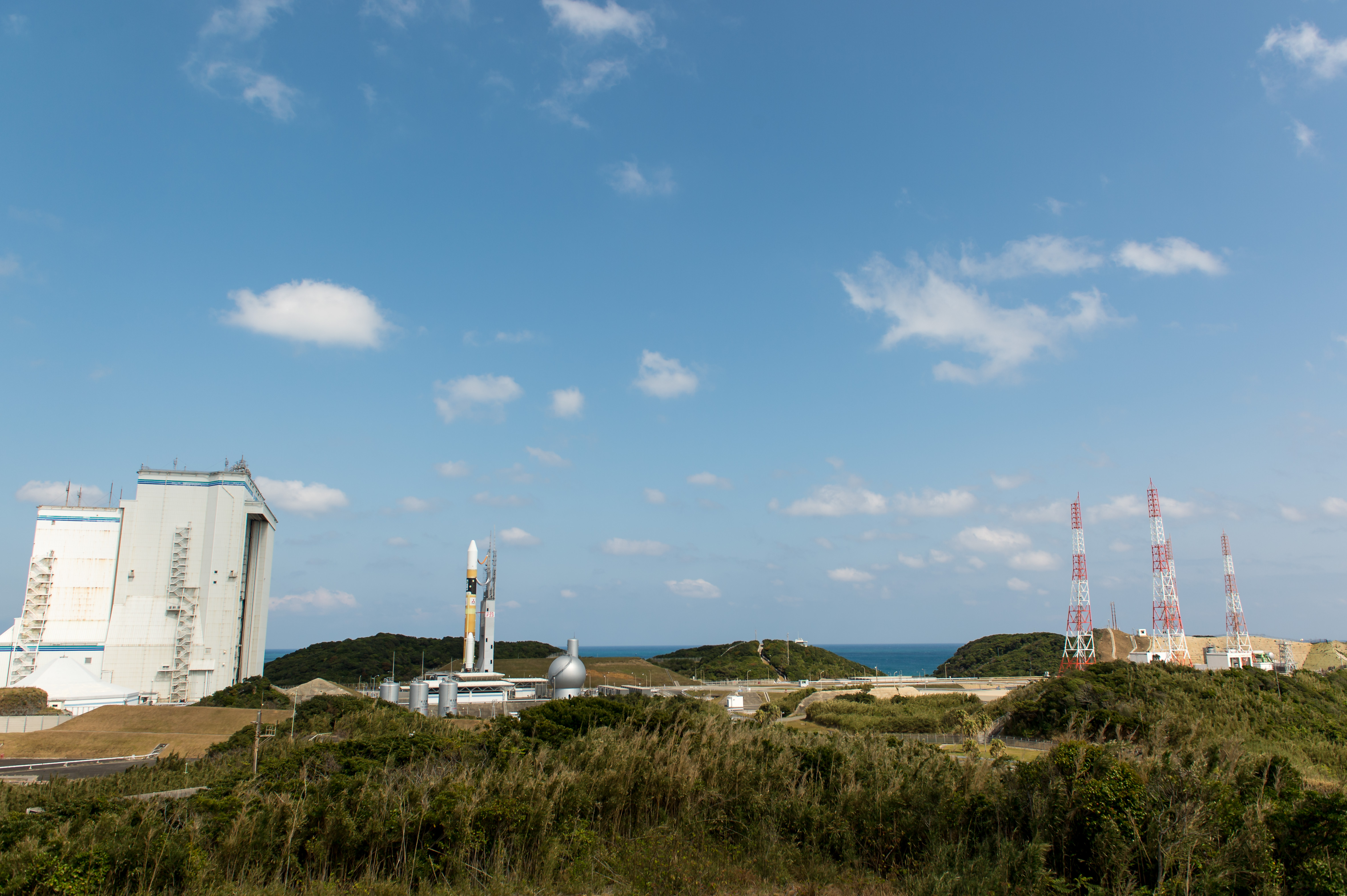
H-IIA Flight 23 (GPM) rollout to LA-Y1, 2014

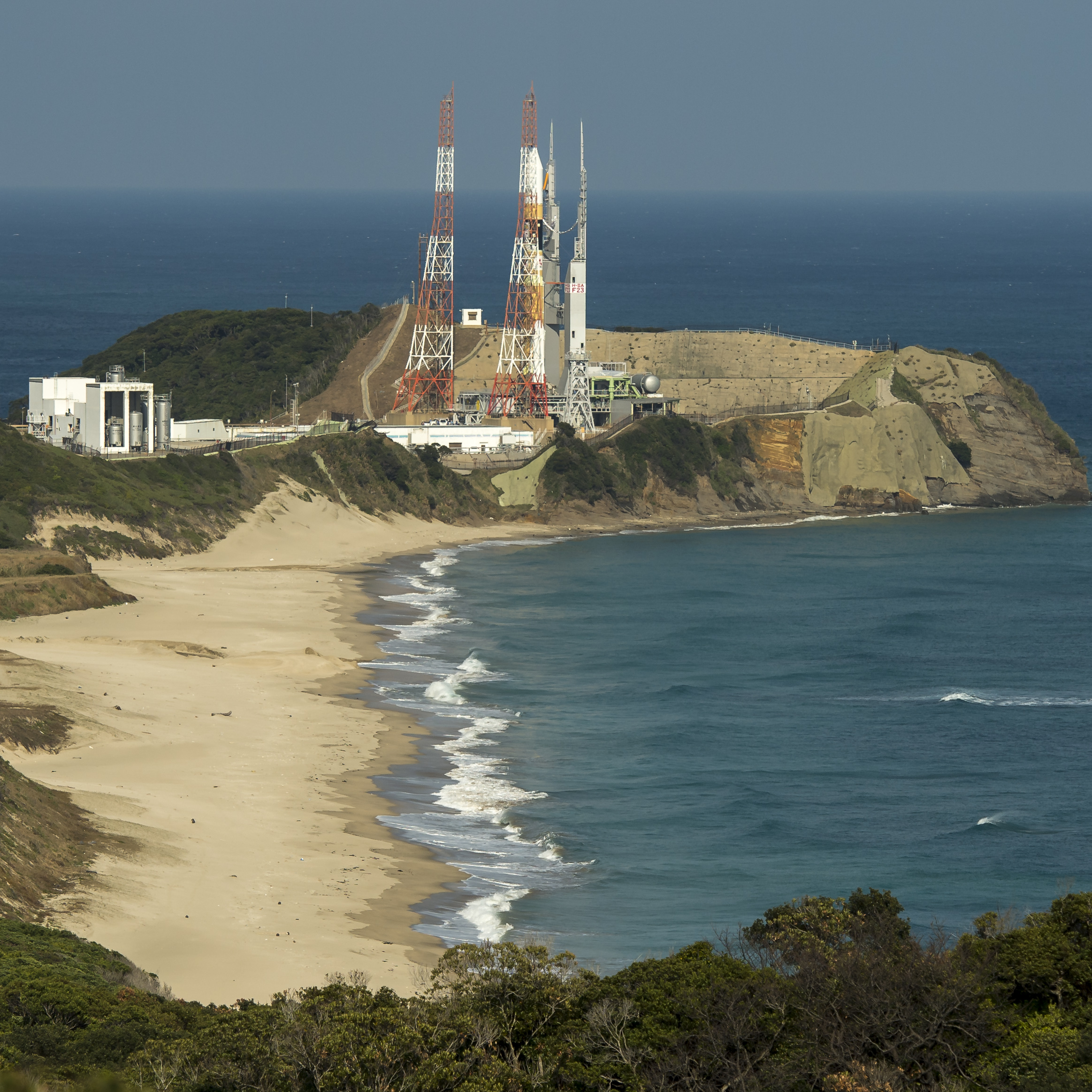
H-IIA Flight 23 (GPM) at LA-Y1, 2014

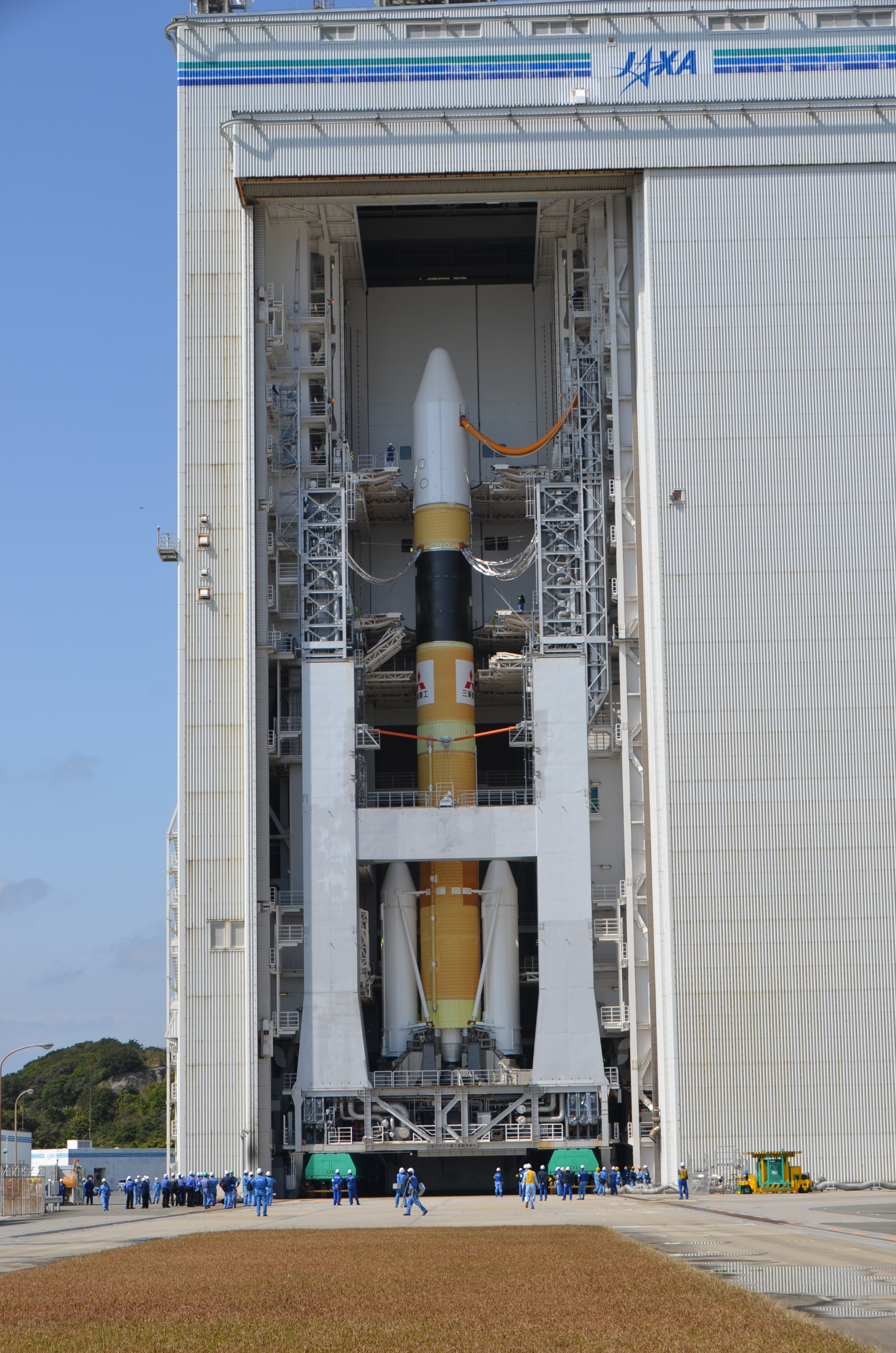
H-IIA rocket at the VAB

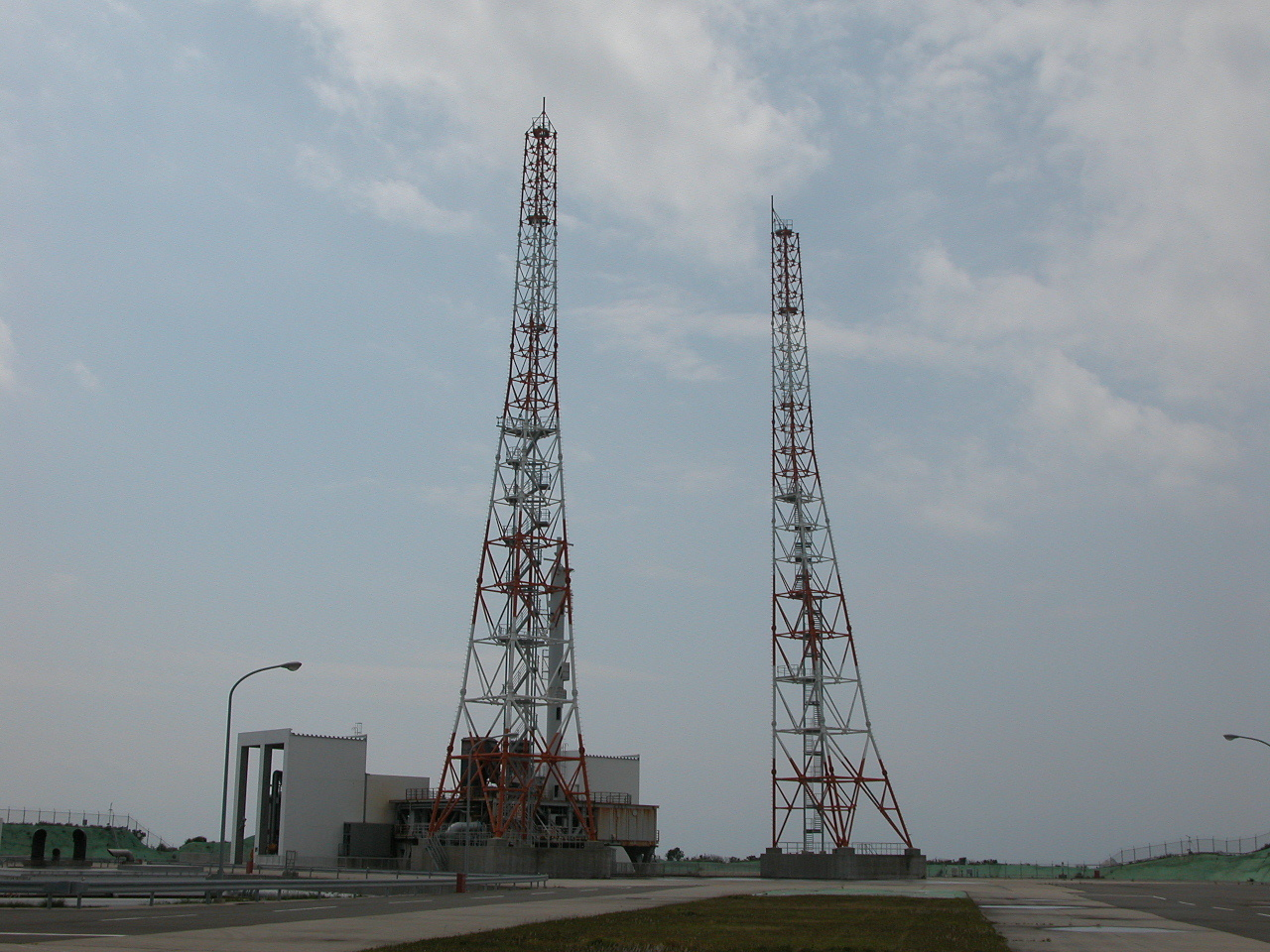
Yoshinobu LA-Y2

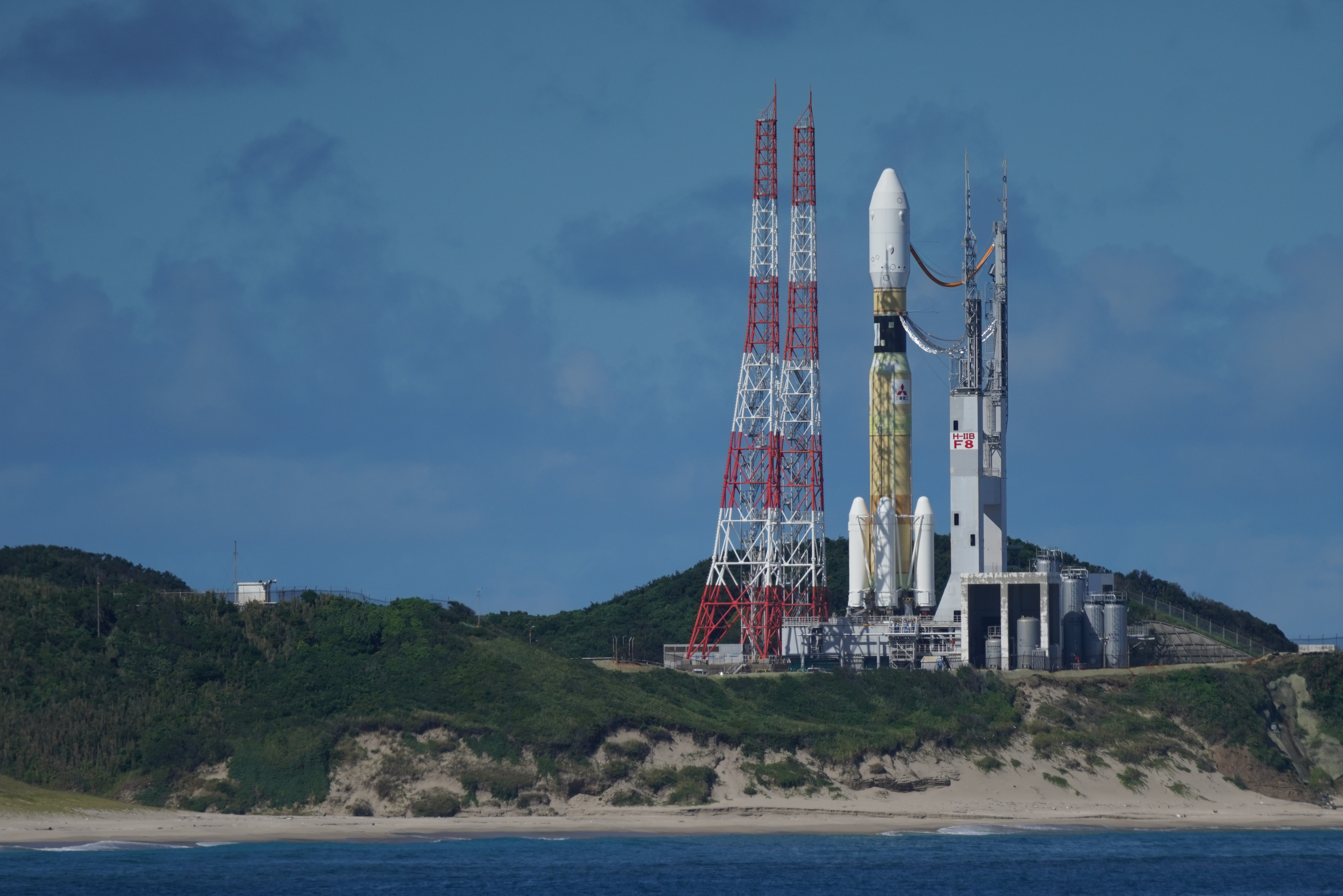
HI-IIB Flight 8 (HTV-8) at LA-Y2, 2019

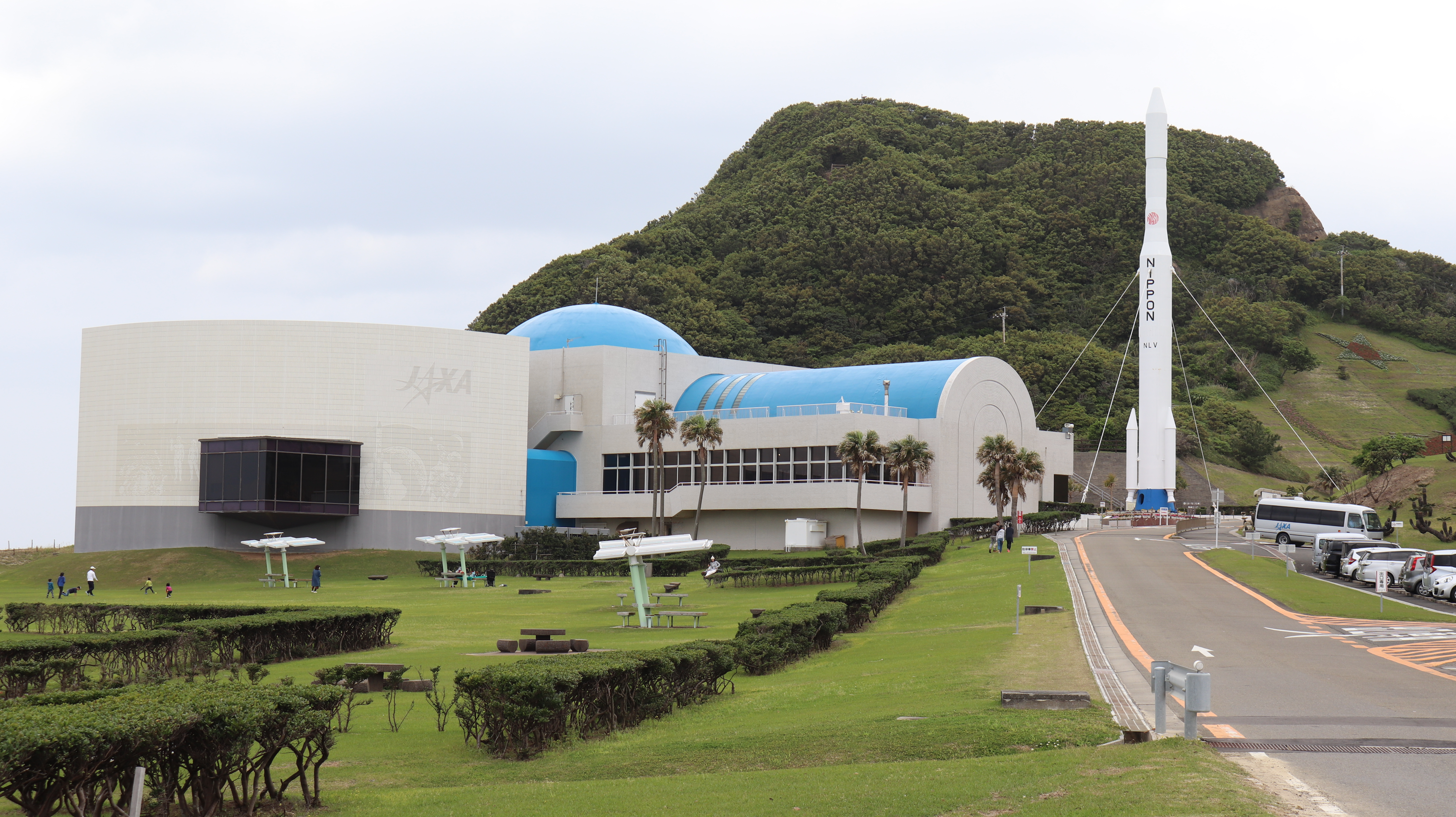
The Space Science and Technology Museum

== See also ==
- 8866 Tanegashima
- Mitsubishi Heavy Industries – Japanese multinational corporation
- Uchinoura Space Center – Japanese Spaceport
