= Yoshinobu Launch Complex =

Japanese launch complex

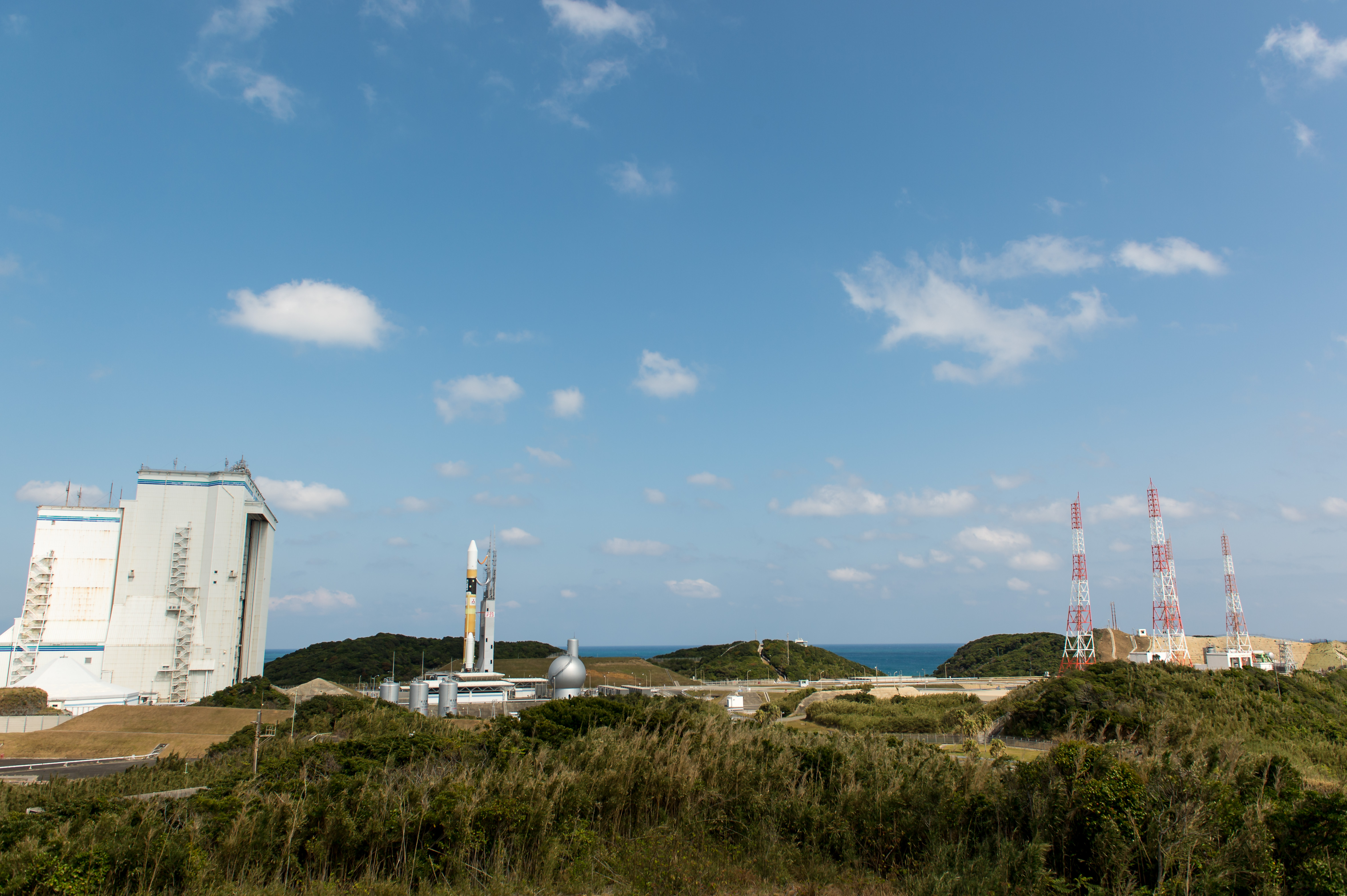
- Full view of the Yoshinobu Launch Complex during roll out of the H-IIA rocket in February 2014
- Interactive map of Yoshinobu Launch Complex
- Launch site: Tanegashima
- Coordinates: 30°24′08″N 130°58′30″E
- Short name: LA-Y
- Operator: JAXA, NASDA (former)
- Total launches: 76
- Launch pad: 2
LA-Y1 launch history
- Status: Inactive
- Launches: 57
- First launch: 3 February 1994; H-II (VEP and OREX)
- Last launch: 28 June 2025; H-IIA (GOSAT-GW)
- Associated rockets: Future: H3; Retired: H-II, H-IIA
LA-Y2 launch history
- Status: Active
- Launches: 19
- First launch: 10 September 2009; H-IIB (HTV-1)
- Last launch: 19 October 2026; H3 (Martian Moons eXploration)
- Associated rockets: Current: H3; Retired: H-IIB

Yoshinobu Launch Complex (abbreviated LA-Y) is a rocket launch site at the Tanegashima Space Center on Tanegashima island in Japan.

== History ==
The Yoshinobu Launch Complex was built in the early 1990s to support launches of larger medium-lift launch vehicles, as the existing Osaki Launch Complex had been designed for small-lift launch vehicles. The Yoshinobu complex was initially developed for the H-II launch vehicle and has since supported launches of the H-IIA, H-IIB, and H3 rockets.

== Facilities ==
The complex consists of two launch pads:

- LA-Y1: previously used for H-II and H-IIA launches, planned to support H3 in the future
- LA-Y2: used for H3 launches, previously used for H-IIB launches

The site includes a vehicle assembly building (VAB), where launch vehicles delivered from manufacturing facilities are assembled, inspected, and prepared for launch. The building can accommodate the simultaneous assembly of two launch vehicles. Rockets are assembled atop a mobile launcher platform (ML), after which the payload and payload fairing are installed before rollout to the launch pad. The VAB is 81 metres (266 ft) tall, 64 metres (210 ft) wide, and 34.5 metres (113 ft) meters deep. The rocket is transported to the launch pad about twelve hours before launch. Transport from the assembly building to pad takes approximately thirty minutes.

The complex also contains the Yoshinobu Block House, located approximately 500 metres (1,600 ft) from the launch pads, next to the VAB. The launch control room is located 12 metres (39 ft) underground, where launch operations and countdown procedures are remotely monitored and controlled.

The Yoshinobu Firing Test Stand is used for ground testing of first-stage rocket engines. It is currently used to test the LE-9 engine developed for the H3 launch vehicle.

== Launch statistics ==
=== LA-Y1 ===
- H-II
- H-IIA
- H3

All launches until March 2003 operated by NASDA and Mitsubishi Heavy Industries. All launches afterwards operated by JAXA and Mitsubishi Heavy Industries.

No.	Date	Time (UTC)	Launch vehicle	Configuration	Payload	Result	Remarks
1	3 February 1994	22:20	H-II	H-II	VEP-1 and OREX	Success	Maiden flight of the H-II family and from the Yoshinobu complex. Reentry demonstrator for OREX, testing various components to be used for the HOPE-X program..
2	28 August 1994	07:50	H-II	H-II	ETS-VI	Success	
3	18 March 1995	08:01	H-II	H-II	GMS-5 and Space Flyer Unit	Success	Space Flyer Unit was retrieved and returned to Earth by Space Shuttle Endeavour in 1996, as part of STS-72.
4	17 August 1996	01:53	H-II	H-II	ADEOS I, Fuji-OSCAR 29, and JAS-2	Success	
5	27 November 1997	21:27	H-II	H-II	Tropical Rainfall Measuring Mission and ETS-VII	Success	Part of Mission to Planet Earth for TRMM, designed to study precipitation in the tropics. Collaboration between JAXA and NASA.
6	21 February 1998	07:55	H-II	H-II	COMETS	Partial failure	Cooling system issues led to premature second stage engine shutdown during geostationary transfer burn, leaving payload stranded in low Earth orbit. Onboard thrusters compensated and allowed for some operations to proceed.
7	15 November 1999	07:29	H-II	H-II	MTSAT-1	Failure	Part of the Himawari series of geostationary weather satellites. Impeller failure led to premature engine shutdown 239 seconds after launch, leading to failure to achieve orbit. Final launch of the baseline H-II.
8	29 August 2001	07:00	H-IIA	H-IIA 202	VEP-2	Success	Maiden flight of the H-IIA. Carried boilerplate payload.
9	4 February 2002	02:45	H-IIA	H-IIA 2024	VEP-3 and MDS-1	Success	
10	10 September 2002	08:20	H-IIA	H-IIA 2024	USERS and DRTS	Success	
11	14 December 2002	01:31	H-IIA	H-IIA 202	ADEOS II, WEOS, FedSat 1, and Micro LabSat 1	Success	
12	28 March 2003	01:27	H-IIA	H-IIA 2024	IGS-Optical 1 and IGS-Radar 1	Success	
13	29 November 2003	04:33	H-IIA	H-IIA 2024	IGS-Optical 2 and IGS-Radar 2	Failure	Gas leak led to failure of a solid rocket booster jettison, with added weigh leading to failure to achieve orbit.
14	26 February 2005	09:25	H-IIA	H-IIA 2022	MTSAT-1R	Success	Part of the Himawari series of geostationary weather satellites.
15	24 January 2006	01:33	H-IIA	H-IIA 2022	ALOS	Success	
16	18 February 2006	06:27	H-IIA	H-IIA 2024	MTSAT-2	Success	Part of the Himawari series of geostationary weather satellites.
17	11 September 2006	04:35	H-IIA	H-IIA 202	IGS-Optical 2	Success	
18	18 December 2006	06:32	H-IIA	H-IIA 204	ETS-VIII	Success	
19	24 February 2007	04:41	H-IIA	H-IIA 2024	IGS-Radar 2 and IGS-Optical 3V	Success	
20	14 September 2007	01:31	H-IIA	H-IIA 2022	SELENE	Success	Also known as Kaguya, designed to explore the Moon. Second spacecraft from Japan to enter lunar orbit, after Hiten. First launch from Tanegashima to another celestial body.
21	23 February 2008	08:55	H-IIA	H-IIA 2024	WINDS	Success	
22	23 January 2009	03:54	H-IIA	H-IIA 202	GOSAT and others	Success	First satellite dedicated to the observation of greenhouse gases.
23	28 November 2009	01:21	H-IIA	H-IIA 202	IGS-Optical 3	Success	
24	20 May 2010	21:58	H-IIA	H-IIA 202	Akatsuki, IKAROS, and others	Success	Part of the PLANET series of spacecraft fort Akatsuki, designed to explore Venus and study its atmosphere. Failed to initially enter Venusian orbit in 2010, but managed to return and successfully entered orbit in 2015. First successful demonstration of solar sail technology beyond LEO for IKAROS. First launch from Tanegashima to enter heliocentric orbit.
25	11 September 2010	11:17	H-IIA	H-IIA 202	QZS-1	Success	
26	23 September 2011	04:36	H-IIA	H-IIA 202	IGS-Optical 4	Success	
27	12 December 2011	01:21	H-IIA	H-IIA 202	IGS-Radar 3	Success	
28	17 May 2012	16:39	H-IIA	H-IIA 202	GCOM-W1, KOMPSAT-3, SDS-4, and HORYU-2	Success	
29	27 January 2013	04:40	H-IIA	H-IIA 202	IGS-Radar 4 and IGS-Optical 5V	Success	
30	27 February 2014	18:37	H-IIA	H-IIA 202	Global Precipitation Measurement and others	Success	Collaboration between JAXA and NASA. Successor to TPMM, designed to make frequent observations of rainfall.
31	24 May 2014	03:05	H-IIA	H-IIA 202	ALOS-2 and others	Success	
32	7 October 2014	05:16	H-IIA	H-IIA 202	Himawari 8	Success	Part of the Himawari series of geostationary weather satellites.
33	3 December 2014	04:22	H-IIA	H-IIA 202	Hayabusa2 and others	Success	Sample-return mission, designed to collect asteroid sediment from 162173 Ryugu and return it to Earth. Successor to the previous Haybusa mission.
34	1 February 2015	01:21	H-IIA	H-IIA 202	IGS-Radar Spare	Success	
35	26 March 2015	01:21	H-IIA	H-IIA 202	IGS-Optical 5	Success	
36	24 November 2015	06:50	H-IIA	H-IIA 204	Telstar 12 Vantage	Success	
37	17 February 2016	08:45	H-IIA	H-IIA 202	Hitomi and others	Success	Space telescope designed to conduct x-ray astronomy. Launch was a success, but attitude control problems led to spacecraft failure 37 days after launch.
38	2 November 2016	06:20	H-IIA	H-IIA 202	Himawari 9	Success	Part of the Himawari series of geostationary weather satellites.
39	24 January 2017	07:44	H-IIA	H-IIA 204	DSN-2	Success	
40	17 March 2017	01:20	H-IIA	H-IIA 202	IGS-Radar 5	Success	
41	1 June 2017	00:17	H-IIA	H-IIA 202	QZS-2	Success	
42	19 August 2017	05:29	H-IIA	H-IIA 204	QZS-3	Success	
43	9 October 2017	22:01	H-IIA	H-IIA 202	QZS-4	Success	
44	23 December 2017	01:26	H-IIA	H-IIA 202	GCOM-C and SLATS	Success	
45	27 February 2018	04:34	H-IIA	H-IIA 202	IGS-Optical 6	Success	
46	12 June 2018	04:20	H-IIA	H-IIA 202	IGS-Radar 6	Success	
47	29 October 2018	04:08	H-IIA	H-IIA 202	GOSAT-2 and others	Success	
48	9 February 2020	01:34	H-IIA	H-IIA 202	IGS-Optical 7	Success	
49	19 July 2020	21:58	H-IIA	H-IIA 202	Emirates Mars Mission	Success	Also known as Hope, designed to explore Mars. Made the United Arab Emirates the fifth nation to enter areocentric orbit. Final H-II series launch into interplanetary space.
50	29 November 2020	07:25	H-IIA	H-IIA 202	JDRS/LUCAS	Success	
51	26 October 2021	02:19	H-IIA	H-IIA 202	QZS-1R	Success	
52	22 December 2021	15:32	H-IIA	H-IIA 204	Inmarsat-6 F1	Success	
53	26 January 2023	01:50	H-IIA	H-IIA 202	IGS-Radar 7	Success	
54	6 September 2023	23:42	H-IIA	H-IIA 202	XRISM and SLIM	Success	Collaboration between NASA, ESA, and JAXA for XRISM, a space telescope designed to perform x-ray astronomy. Lunar lander for SLIM, making Japan the fifth nation to successfully land on the Moon. Also set non-RTG record for staying operational on the Lunar surface, at 3 months and 10 days. Final H-II series launch beyond LEO.
55	12 January 2024	04:44	H-IIA	H-IIA 202	IGS-Optical 8	Success	
56	26 September 2024	05:24	H-IIA	H-IIA 202	IGS-Radar 8	Success	
57	28 June 2025	16:33	H-IIA	H-IIA 202	GOSAT-GW	Success	Final launch of the H-IIA, and last flight of an H-II series launch vehicle.

=== LA-Y2 ===
- H-IIB
- H3

All flights operated by JAXA and Mitsubishi Heavy Industries.

No.	Date	Time (UTC)	Launch vehicle	Configuration	Payload	Result	Remarks
1	10 September 2009	17:01	H-IIB	H-IIB	HTV Demonstration Flight	Success	Maiden flight of the H-IIB and from LA-Y2. First launch of the H-II Transfer Vehicle, going to the International Space Station. Made Tanegashima the fourth launch site (after Baikonur, Cape Canaveral/KSC, and Kourou) to send a payload to the ISS.
2	22 January 2011	05:37	H-IIB	H-IIB	Kounotori 2	Success	ISS resupply flight.
3	21 July 2012	02:06	H-IIB	H-IIB	Kounotori 3	Success	ISS resupply flight.
4	3 August 2013	19:48	H-IIB	H-IIB	Kounotori 4	Success	ISS resupply flight.
5	19 August 2015	11:50	H-IIB	H-IIB	Kounotori 5	Success	ISS resupply flight.
6	9 December 2016	13:26	H-IIB	H-IIB	Kounotori 6	Success	ISS resupply flight.
7	22 September 2018	17:52	H-IIB	H-IIB	Kounotori 7	Success	ISS resupply flight.
8	24 September 2019	16:05	H-IIB	H-IIB	Kounotori 8	Success	ISS resupply flight.
9	20 May 2020	17:31	H-IIB	H-IIB	Kounotori 9	Success	ISS resupply flight. Final H-IIB launch and last flight of the H-II Transfer Vehicle.
10	7 March 2023	01:37	H3	H3‑22S	ALOS-3	Failure	Maiden flight of the H3. Electrical circuit failure caused second stage engine to not ignite, leading to failure of placing payload into orbit.
11	17 February 2024	00:22	H3	H3‑22S	VEP-4	Success	First successful H3 launch. Boilerplate payload, plus carried two rideshares.
12	1 July 2024	03:06	H3	H3‑22S	ALOS-4	Success	
13	4 November 2024	06:48	H3	H3‑22S	DSN-3	Success	
14	2 February 2025	08:30	H3	H3‑22S	QZS-6	Success	
15	26 October 2025	00:00	H3	H3-24W	HTV-X1	Success	First launch of the HTV-X spacecraft, going to the International Space Station.
16	22 December 2025	01:51	H3	H3‑22S	QZS-5	Failure	Payload support structure failed during fairing separation, leading to loss of payload before vehicle made orbit.
17	12 June 2026	00:53	H3	H3‑30S	VEP-5	Success	Boilerplate payload, plus carried six rideshares.
18	10 August 2026	19:23	H3	H3‑22S	QZS-7	Success	
19	19 October 2026	19:41	H3	H3-24L	Martian Moons eXploration	Success	Sample-return mission designed to retrieve sediment from Mars's moon Phobos and return it to Earth. First H3 flight beyond geostationary orbit and into interplanetary space.

==== Upcoming launches ====
Date	Launch vehicle	Payload
1H 2027	H3	ETS-IX
2027	H3	HTV-X2

== See also ==
- List of Yoshinobu Launch Complex launches
