= ALOS-3 =

Japanese satellite

Advanced Land Observing Satellite 3
- Names: Daichi 3
- Mission type: Remote sensing
- Operator: JAXA
- Website: www.jaxa.jp/projects/sat/alos3/index_j.html
- Mission duration: 13 minutes and 55 seconds

Spacecraft properties
- Manufacturer: Mitsubishi Electric

Start of mission
- Launch date: 7 March 2023 1:38:15 UTC
- Rocket: H3-22S
- Launch site: Tanegashima LP2
- Contractor: Mitsubishi Heavy Industries

End of mission
- Disposal: Destroyed via FTS
- Last contact: March 7 2023 1:55 approximately
- Decay date: March 7 2023

Orbital parameters
- Reference system: Geocentric
- Regime: Sun-synchronous

Instruments
- OPS: OPtical Sensor; IRS: InfraRed Sensor

Advanced Land Observing Satellite 3 (ALOS-3), also called Daichi 3, was a 3-ton Japanese satellite launched on March 7 2023 which failed to reach orbit. It was to succeed the optical sensor PRISM (Panchromatic Remote-sensing Instruments for Stereo Mapping) carried on the ALOS satellite, which operated from 2006 to 2011. The ALOS-2 satellite and the ALOS-4 satellite carry synthetic-aperture radar.

The satellite was launched as the payload on the first launch of the H3 rocket in March 2023. A failure of the second stage engine to ignite led to the rocket along with its payload ALOS-3 being destroyed by use of Flight Termination System (FTS) to prevent risk of falling debris.

== Spacecraft details ==
ALOS-3 had a mass of 3 tonnes, and 7 reaction wheels. Design life was 7 years.

== Launch ==
ALOS-3 launched from Tanegashima, Japan by a H3 rocket on 7 March 2023. Initially the launch was scheduled for 17 February but was aborted seconds before liftoff.

=== Timeline ===
MET	Time		Date(UTC)	Event
MET	JST	UTC	Date(UTC)	Event
X-22:00:00	12:37:55	03:37:55	6 March 2023	1st Go/No-Go Decision
X-18:00:00	16:37:55	07:37:55	6 March 2023	Airframe movement (VAB > LP2)
X-12:00:00	22:37:55	14:37:55	6 March 2023	2nd Go/No-Go Decision
X-00:57:00	09:40:55	00:40:55	7 March 2023	3rd Go/No-Go Decision
X-00:10:00	10:27:55	01:27:55	7 March 2023	Final Go/No-Go Decision
X-00:08:00	10:29:55	01:29:55	7 March 2023	Start of Countdown
X-00:07:00	10:30:55	01:30:55	7 March 2023	Safety System ready
X-00:07:00	10:30:55	01:30:55	7 March 2023	Completion of Firing System Preparation
X-00:05:00	10:32:55	01:32:55	7 March 2023	Satellite System ready
X-00:04:00	10:33:55	01:33:55	7 March 2023	Automatic Countdown Sequence Start
X-00:04:00	10:33:55	01:33:55	7 March 2023	Start of Pressurization of each tank
X-00:02:50	10:35:05	01:35:05	7 March 2023	Power Switching (External to Internal)
X-00:00:55	10:37:00	01:37:00	7 March 2023	Completion of each tank Pressurization
X-00:00:53	10:37:02	01:37:02	7 March 2023	Frame deflector operation
X-00:00:35	10:37:20	01:37:20	7 March 2023	Water Curtain operation
X-00:00:18	10:37:37	01:37:37	7 March 2023	Flight mode on
X-00:00:15	10:37:40	01:37:40	7 March 2023	Single-Stage Thermal battery activation
X-00:00:15	10:37:40	01:37:40	7 March 2023	All System are ready
X-00:00:12.	10:37:43.	01:37:43	7 March 2023	Pyrotechnic Torch Ignition
X-00:00:06	10:37:49	01:37:49	7 March 2023	LE-9 Engine Start
X+00:00:00	10:37:55	01:37:55	7 March 2023	SRB-3 Engine Start & Liftoff
X+00:01:06	10:39:01	01:39:01	7 March 2023	Max Q
X+00:01:56	10:39:51	01:39:51	7 March 2023	SRB-3 Jettision
X+00:03:32	10:41:27	01:41:27	7 March 2023	Satellite Fairing Separation
X+00:04:56	10:42:51	01:42:51	7 March 2023	Main Engine Cutoff (MECO)
X+00:05:04	10:42:59	01:42:59	7 March 2023	1st and 2nd Stage Separation
X+00:13:55	10:51:50	01:51:50	7 March 2023	Flight Interruption

== Mission and sensors ==
If it had been successfully launched, ALOS-3 would have been an Earth observation satellite and was to be used to monitor natural disasters as well as for cartography. ALOS-3 carried OPS (OPtical Sensor), a multi-band optical camera which is an upgrade from the PRISM sensor. OPS was capable of observing a 70-kilometer (43 mi) wide strip of land on Earth. In addition to the RGB and infrared band covered by the predecessor ALOS satellite, ALOS-3 has two additional bandwidths: coastal and red edge. Coastal allows observation underwater up to a depth of 30m, while red edge was to be used to monitor vegetation growth.

== Observation modes of ALOS-3 ==
=== Strip map observation mode ===
This was the default observation mode of ALOS-3. It observed in an area which was 70 km in width and 4,000 km in length in the direction of the orbital path(path of the orbit).

=== Stereoscopic observation mode ===
This mode acquired stereo-pair image of a certain point from two different directions(it acquired a three dimensional picture of some point on earth).

=== Pointing observation mode ===
This mode would have been capable of observing any given point in Japan within 24 hours after receiving the request to use the 'point observation mode' using pointing function of the satellite to point up to 60 degrees in all directions against the satellite nadir.

=== Wide-area observation mode ===
This mode was capable of observing a wide-area of over 200km by 100km with the help of multiple scan observations during an orbital path of the satellite.

=== Changing direction observation mode ===
Continuously observe an area, even if it is not along the trajectory, by controlling the attitude(attitude refers to the orientation of the satellite in space, or how it's pointing, relative to a reference frame like the Earth or the Sun. It's essentially describing the satellite's "direction" or "pointing angle") of the satellite and changing the direction of observation(the direction where the satellite is observing).

== See also ==
- 2023 in spaceflight
