= H3 (rocket) =

Japanese medium-lift launch vehicle

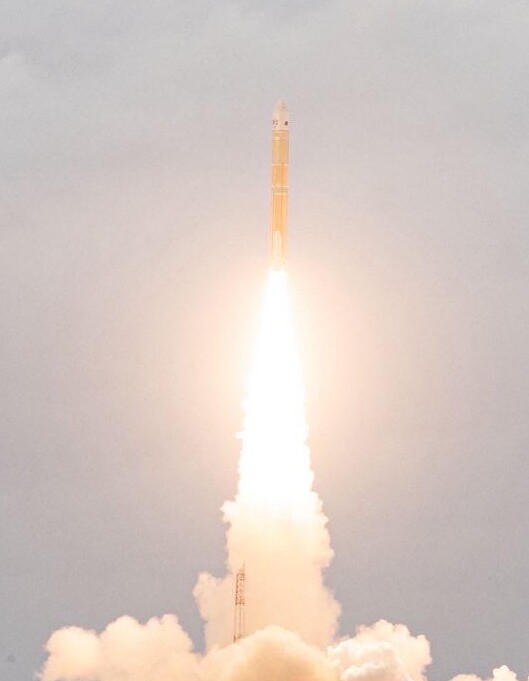
- Launch of a H3 rocket carrying the QZS-6 satellite on 2 February 2025
- Function: Medium-lift launch vehicle
- Manufacturer: Mitsubishi Heavy Industries
- Country of origin: Japan
- Cost per launch: H3‑30: ¥5 billion (2023) (equivalent to ¥5.13 billion or US$33.92 million in 2024)

Size
- Height: With S fairing: 57 m (187 ft); With L or W fairing: 63 m (207 ft)
- Diameter: 5.27 m (17.3 ft)
- Mass: H3‑30: 271 t (597,000 lb); H3‑22: 420 t (930,000 lb); H3‑24: 575 t (1,268,000 lb)
- Stages: 2

Capacity

Payload to LEO (ISS)
- Altitude: 420 km (260 mi)
- Orbital inclination: 51.64°
- Mass: H3‑24: 16,000 kg (35,000 lb)

Payload to SSO
- Altitude: 500 km (310 mi)
- Orbital inclination: 90°
- Mass: H3‑30: 4,000 kg (8,800 lb)

Payload to GTO (Δ-v 1,500 m/sec)
- Mass: H3‑24: 7,900 kg (17,400 lb)

Associated rockets
- Based on: H-IIA · H-IIB
- Comparable: Ariane 6; Atlas V; Falcon 9; Long March; 7; 8; 12; LVM3; Soyuz-2; Vulcan Centaur

Launch history
- Status: Active
- Launch sites: Tanegashima, LP2
- Total launches: 10
- Success(es): 8
- Failure: 2
- First flight: 7 March 2023
- Last flight: 19 October 2026 (most recent)
- Carries passengers or cargo: ALOS-4; HTV-X; IGS; QZSS

Boosters – SRB-3
- No. boosters: 0, 2 or 4
- Height: 15 m (49 ft)
- Diameter: 2.5 m (8 ft 2 in)
- Gross mass: 76.2 t (168,000 lb) each
- Propellant mass: 67.2 t (148,000 lb) each
- Maximum thrust: 2,300 kN (520,000 lb_{f}) each
- Total thrust: 4,600 or 9,200 kN (1,000,000 or 2,100,000 lb_{f})
- Specific impulse: 283.6 s (2.781 km/s)
- Burn time: 110 seconds

First stage
- Height: 37 m (121 ft)
- Gross mass: 241 t (531,000 lb)
- Propellant mass: 226 t (498,000 lb)
- Powered by: 2 or 3 × LE-9
- Maximum thrust: 2,942 or 4,413 kN (661,000 or 992,000 lb_{f})
- Specific impulse: 425 s (4.17 km/s)
- Burn time: 300 or 225 seconds
- Propellant: LOX / LH_{2}

Second stage
- Height: 12 m (39 ft)
- Gross mass: 28 t (62,000 lb)
- Propellant mass: 24.6 t (54,000 lb)
- Powered by: 1 × LE-5B-3
- Maximum thrust: 137 kN (31,000 lb_{f})
- Specific impulse: 448 s (4.39 km/s)
- Burn time: 699 seconds
- Propellant: LOX / LH_{2}

The H3 is a Japanese medium-lift launch vehicle developed by JAXA and Mitsubishi Heavy Industries (MHI). A hydrolox-fuelled rocket, it is the successor to the H-IIA and H-IIB launch vehicles. The H3 uses the LE-9 main engine, which was designed to be less expensive to produce as part of a broader effort to lower launch costs. The rocket has a modular design: its first stage is powered by two or three LE-9 engines and can be fitted with zero, two, or four SRB-3 solid rocket boosters, which are also used on the Epsilon S small-lift launch vehicle. The second stage uses the LE-5B-3 engine, an upgraded version of the engine family used since the H-I rocket.

Development of the H3 began in 2013. Its maiden flight in March 2023 failed after the second-stage engine did not ignite. The rocket's first successful flight took place in February 2024.

In addition to launching satellites into Earth orbit, the H3 is used to launch the HTV-X cargo spacecraft to the International Space Station. The rocket also successfully launched the Martian Moons eXploration probe towards Mars in October 2026, and is planned to launch the Lunar Polar Exploration Mission probe.

== Development ==
MHI was responsible for overall development of the H3 and oversees final assembly of the launch vehicle and its liquid-fuel engines. Other major Japanese contributors include IHI Corporation, which produces the liquid-fuel engine turbopumps and solid-fuel boosters; Kawasaki Heavy Industries, which builds the S- and L-type payload fairings; and Toray Industries, which supplies the carbon fiber and synthetic resin used in the booster motor cases and fairings. Switzerland-based Beyond Gravity manufactures the W-type fairing, based on its standard 5.4-metre-wide (18 ft) design also used on Ariane 6 and Vulcan Centaur.

Detailed development of the H3 began in 2014 following government approval of the program on 17 May 2013, with MHI serving as the prime contractor and developing the propulsion system jointly with JAXA. The H3 was designed to serve government and commercial launch markets. Compared with the H-IIA, the H3 was designed with simpler and less expensive engines to reduce manufacturing time, technical risk and overall cost. JAXA and MHI were responsible for preliminary design work, development of new technologies, manufacturing and preparation of ground facilities.

As of 2015, the first H3 launch was planned for Japanese fiscal year (JFY) 2020 in the H3‑30 configuration, which lacks solid rocket boosters, followed by a booster-equipped version in JFY21. (Note: A Japanese Fiscal Year starts in April of the year and ends in March of the next year. For this case, it denotes launch will occur no earlier than 1 April 2021, and no later than 31 March 2022.)

The newly developed LE-9 engine was the key to cost reduction, while increasing thrust and improving safety margins. The engine employs an expander bleed cycle, a combustion method previously used on the upper-stage LE-5A engine, and never before used on a first-stage. While such cycles typically cannot produce high thrust, the LE-9 was designed to reach 1,471 kN (331,000 lb_{f}), making its development one of the most significant challenges of the program.

Ground tests of the LE-9 began in April 2017, and the first solid rocket booster tests were conducted in August 2018.

During qualification tests of the LE-9 in May 2020, engineers discovered an opening in the combustion chamber wall and a fatigue fracture in the liquid-hydrogen fuel turbopump turbine. Resolving these issues delayed the inaugural H3 launch from its planned 2021 schedule to 2023.

The first launch attempt on 17 February 2023 was aborted shortly before ignition of the SRB-3 boosters, although the main engines had ignited successfully. The second launch attempt occurred on 7 March 2023 at 01:37:55 UTC. Approximately five minutes and twenty-seven seconds after launch, the second-stage engine failed to ignite. Because the vehicle could not attain the required velocity, JAXA issued a flight termination command 14 minutes and 50 seconds after launch, destroying both the launch vehicle and the ALOS-3 satellite.

After an investigation into the failure of the first test flight and implementation of corrective measures, the second test vehicle was launched on 17 February 2024. During the mission, the second stage reached its intended orbit, marking the first fully successful H3 flight.

The first flight of the H3-24 configuration occurred on 26 October 2025, carrying the HTV-X cargo spacecraft on its inaugural mission to the International Space Station.

A H3‑22S failed during flight on 22 December 2025. JAXA stated that it suspected the Payload Support Structure failed shortly after fairing separation, causing damage to the second-stage liquid hydrogen tank. The initial second-stage burn lasted 27 seconds longer than planned, consistent with abnormal tank pressurization, and the engine shut down one second after the start of the second burn, consistent with fuel depletion. Video footage showed a large object separating from the vehicle shortly after fairing separation, which investigators believed was the payload.

The H3 returned to flight on 12 June 2026 with the first launch of the H3-30 configuration, successfully placing a test payload and several rideshare payloads into orbit.

== Vehicle description ==
The H3 is a two-stage launch vehicle. The first stage uses two or three LE-9 engines fueled by 225 tonnes (496,000 lb) liquid oxygen and liquid hydrogen (hydrolox) propellants. The first-stage can be fitted with zero, two, or four strap-on SRB-3 solid rocket boosters (SRBs) derived from the SRB-A and fueled with polybutadiene. The second stage is powered by an upgraded LE-5B-3 engine and carries 23 tonnes (51,000 lb) of hydrolox propellant.

H3 has dual-launch capability, but MHI has said it is focused on dedicated launches in order to prioritize schedule assurance for customers.

== Variants ==
H3 configurations are identified by a two-digit number and a letter. The first digit indicates the number of LE-9 engines on the core stage (two or three), while the second digit indicates the number of SRB-3 solid rocket boosters (zero, two, or four). The final letter specifies the payload fairing: short ("S"), long ("L"), or wide ("W"). For example, the H3‑24L has two LE-9 engines, four SRBs, and a long fairing, while the H3‑30S has three engines, no SRBs, and a short fairing.

As of 2026, five configurations were offered: H3‑30S, H3‑22S, H3‑22L, H3‑24L, and H3‑24W.

The H3‑32, a proposed variant with three engines and two SRBs, was cancelled in late 2018 after tests showed that the H3‑22 offered better-than-expected performance, reducing the need for the more powerful version. JAXA cited commercial precedent, noting that SpaceX's Falcon 9 frequently launched satellites into a low geostationary transfer orbit (GTO), leaving the satellites to raise themselves to a geostationary orbit. Since commercial clients appeared willing to accept this trade-off, JAXA concluded that customers would prefer the less expensive H3‑22 even if it required additional onboard satellite propellant.

The H3‑30 configuration is designed as a low-cost variant, expected to be used primarily by government customers. It can carry a payload of up to 4,000 kg (8,800 lb) into sun-synchronous orbit (SSO) for about ¥5 billion (equivalent to ¥5.13 billion or US$33.92 million in 2024), about half the cost of the H-IIA and intended to be on par with SpaceX's Falcon 9.

The most powerful H3‑24 variant can deliver more than 6,000 kg (13,000 lb) of payload to trans-lunar injection (TLI) and 7,900 kg (17,400 lb) of payload to GTO.

== Future upgrades ==
MHI has stated that it plans to address growing demand for low-cost small-satellite launches by introducing rideshare missions capable of carrying multiple payloads on a single H3 launch.

As of October 2019, MHI was studying several upgrades for the H3, including an extended second stage and a heavy-lift variant. Proposed second-stage improvements included increasing propellant capacity and developing a new upper-stage engine.

The proposed heavy-lift configuration would consist of three H3 core stages operating in parallel, similar to the Delta IV Heavy and Falcon Heavy. The vehicle was projected to place up to 28,300 kilograms (62,400 lb) into low Earth orbit.

== Launch history ==
- Failure
- Partial failure
- Success
- Planned

=== Past launches ===
Flight	Launch (UTC)	Version	Launch site	Payload(s)	Orbit	Outcome
TF1	7 March 2023, 01:37:55	H3‑22S	Tanegashima, LP2	ALOS-3	SSO	Failure
TF1	First flight of the H3 launch vehicle. The second-stage engine failed to ignite due to an electrical circuit failure between the vehicle controller and the engine igniter during ignition.					
TF2	17 February 2024, 00:22:55	H3‑22S	Tanegashima, LP2	VEP-4 + 2 rideshares	SSO	Success
TF2	Second test flight of the H3 launch vehicle. Carried JAXA's fourth Vehicle Evaluation Payload (VEP-4) along with rideshares CE-SAT-1E and TIRSAT.					
F3	1 July 2024, 03:06:42	H3‑22S	Tanegashima, LP2	ALOS-4	SSO	Success
F4	4 November 2024, 06:48	H3‑22S	Tanegashima, LP2	DSN-3	GTO	Success
F5	2 February 2025, 08:30	H3‑22S	Tanegashima, LP2	QZS-6	GTO	Success
F7 (Note: Although designated F7 (Flight 7), it was the rocket's sixth flight. F6, the first launch of the H3-30 configuration, was delayed after defects were found during a July 2025 captive firing test.)	26 October 2025, 00:00:15	H3‑24W	Tanegashima, LP2	HTV-X1	LEO (ISS)	Success
F7	First flight of the H3-24 configuration (4 SRBs). First flight of the HTV-X cargo spacecraft to the International Space Station. Demonstrated the Autonomous Flight Safety System and TDRS telemetry. These systems are needed to attain the full design capacity of the HTV-X on future missions by allowing the flight to be terminated if anomalies are detected while the rocket is beyond the range of ground control stations.					
F8	22 December 2025, 01:51	H3‑22S	Tanegashima, LP2	QZS-5	GTO	Failure
F8	JAXA suspects the Payload Support Structure failed catastrophically just after fairing separation, causing damage to the second stage LH₂ tank. The initial second-stage burn lasted 27 seconds longer than planned, consistent with abnormal tank pressurization, followed by an unexpected engine shutdown one second into the second burn, consistent with fuel depletion. Video footage showed a large object separating from the vehicle shortly after fairing separation, believed to be the payload.					
F6	12 June 2026, 00:53:59	H3‑30S	Tanegashima, LP2	VEP-5 + 6 rideshares	LEO	Success
F6	First flight of the H3-30 configuration (zero SRBs); Japan's first launch of an all-liquid-propellant orbital rocket. First rocket with only expander bleed cycle engines. Carried JAXA's fifth Vehicle Evaluation Payload (VEP-5) along with rideshares PETREL, STARS-X, BRO-22, VERTECS, HORN-L, HORN-R.					
F9	10 August 2026, 19:23:31	H3‑22S	Tanegashima, LP2	QZS-7	GTO	Success
F9	First H3 night launch.					
F10	19 October 2026, 19:41:03	H3‑24L	Tanegashima, LP2	Martian Moons eXploration (MMX)	TMI	Success
F10	First H3 launch to leave Earth orbit.					

=== Planned launches ===
Planned launches are listed chronologically when firm plans are in place. The order of the later launches is much less certain. Tentative launch dates and mission details are sourced from multiple locations. Launches are expected to take place "no earlier than" (NET) the listed date.

Launch (UTC)	Version	Launch site	Payload(s)	Orbit
H1 2027	H3‑24L	Tanegashima, LP2	ETS-IX	GEO
H1 2027	H3‑30S	Tanegashima, LP2	IGS-Optical Diversification 1	
H1 2027	H3‑22S	Tanegashima, LP2	SDA Satellite	
2027	H3‑24W	Tanegashima, LP2	HTV-X2	LEO (ISS)
2027	H3‑24W	Tanegashima, LP2	HTV-X3	LEO (ISS)
2027	TBA	Tanegashima	Eutelsat (TBD)	
2027	TBA	Tanegashima	Mid-Inclination Rideshare: 3 × QPS-SAR (iQPS), ELS-R (ElevationSpace), 2 × StriX (Synspective)	LEO
2027	H3‑30S	Tanegashima	IGS-Optical 9	
2028	TBA	Tanegashima	IGS-Optical Diversification 2	
Q1 2028	TBA	Tanegashima	MBR Explorer	
20 April 2028	TBA	Tanegashima	DESTINY^{+} Ramses	
2028	TBA	Tanegashima	LUPEX (Chandrayaan-5)	TLI
2028	H3‑24W	Tanegashima	HTV-X4	LEO (ISS)
2028	TBA	Tanegashima	IGS-Radar Diversification 1	
2028	H3‑24W	Tanegashima	HTV-X5	LEO (ISS)
2028	H3‑22S	Tanegashima	ispace Mission 3	TLI
2030	TBA	Tanegashima	IGS-Radar Diversification 2	
2030	H3‑24W	Tanegashima	HTV-X6	LEO (ISS)
2030	TBA	Tanegashima	Himawari 10	
2030	TBA	Tanegashima	IGS-Optical 10	
2030~2033	TBA	Tanegashima	Next Generation Small-Body Sample Return (NGSR)	
2031	TBA	Tanegashima	QZS-3R	GTO
2032	TBA	Tanegashima	QZS-8	GTO
2032	TBA	Tanegashima	IGS-Radar 9	
2032	TBA	Tanegashima	Orbital Transfer Vehicle	
2036	TBA	Tanegashima	LiteBIRD	
TBD	TBA	Tanegashima	IGS-Radar 10	
TBD	TBA	Tanegashima	IGS-Optical Diversification 3	
TBD	TBA	Tanegashima	IGS-Optical 11	
TBD	TBA	Tanegashima	IGS-Optical Diversification 4	
TBD	TBA	Tanegashima	Inmarsat (satellite TBD)	
