= ALOS-4 =

Japanese earth observation satellite

Advanced Land Observing Satellite 4
- Names: ALOS-4 · Daichi 4
- Mission type: Remote sensing
- Operator: JAXA
- COSPAR ID: 2024-123A
- SATCAT no.: 60182
- Website: www.jaxa.jp/projects/sat/alos4/index_j.html
- Mission duration: 519 days, 5 hours, 12 minutes (elapsed)

Spacecraft properties
- Manufacturer: Mitsubishi Electric

Start of mission
- Launch date: 1 July 2024, 03:06:00 UTC
- Rocket: H3-22S
- Launch site: Tanegashima, LA-Y2
- Contractor: Mitsubishi Heavy Industries

Orbital parameters
- Reference system: Geocentric
- Regime: Sun-synchronous

Instruments
- PALSAR-3: Phased Array Type L-band Synthetic Aperture Radar-3; SPAISE3: SPace based AIS Experiment 3rd

Advanced Land Observing Satellite 4 (ALOS-4), also called Daichi 4 (daichi is a Japanese word meaning "great land"), is a 3,000 kg (6,600 lb) Japanese L-band synthetic-aperture radar (SAR) satellite that was launched on July 1, 2024. It carries PALSAR-3 (Phased Array type L-band Synthetic Aperture Radar-3), which is a successor to the PALSAR-2 on ALOS-2 satellite. ALOS-4 is the fourth satellite which carries L-band SAR operated by JAXA, following JERS-1, ALOS, and ALOS-2.

Obervational data obtained by ALOS-4 is distributed by private companies such as Synspective and Pasco Corporation.

== Features ==
The ALOS ("Daichi") series is characterized by achieving both high spatial resolution and wide observation swath, as well as continuous imaging capability. Among them, the radar satellites are equipped with the PALSAR series of L-band synthetic aperture radar, which allows for effective penetration into vegetation to observe ground surfaces and crustal movements compared to other radar satellites using bands such as X- or C-band. ALOS-4 is further enhanced from ALOS-2 by equipping the new PALSAR-3 synthetic aperture radar, which employs the new digital beamforming SAR technology. While the observation range in spotlight mode with a resolution of 1 m x 3 m was 25 km square for ALOS-2, ALOS-4 enables observation over a 35 km square area. Additionally, while the observation swath of the high-resolution mode with a resolution of 3 m was 50 km for ALOS-2, ALOS-4 achieves a swath of 200 km with the same resolution. Furthermore, while the observation swath of the wide-area observation mode with a resolution of 100 m was 350 km for ALOS-2, ALOS-4 achieves a swath of 700 km with a resolution of 25 m. By achieving an unprecedented combination of high spatial resolution and wide observation swath, the high-resolution mode observation of the entire Japan area, which was possible only four times a year with ALOS-2, will be possible 20 times a year (once every two weeks) with ALOS-4. Because ALOS-2 is still in operation after the launch of ALOS-4, these two satellites are expected to operate simultaneously as a constellation.

== Monitoring of disasters ==
Following the 2024 Noto earthquake, ALOS-2 conducted observation of the Noto Peninsula, which took one week to complete. ALOS-4 meanwhile will be capable of observing the same swath by passing overhead of the area only once.

== See also ==
- iQPS
- Synspective
- 2024 in spaceflight
