= Atmospheric correction for interferometric synthetic aperture radar technique =

Atmospheric correction for Interferometric Synthetic Aperture Radar (InSAR) technique is a set of different methods to remove artefact displacement from an interferogram caused by the effect of weather variables such as humidity, temperature, and pressure. An interferogram is generated by processing two synthetic-aperture radar images before and after a geophysical event like an earthquake. Corrections for atmospheric variations are an important stage of InSAR data processing in many study areas to measure surface displacement because relative humidity differences of 20% can cause inaccuracies of 10–14 cm InSAR due to varying delays in the radar signal. Overall, atmospheric correction methods can be divided into two categories: a) Using Atmospheric Phase Screen (APS) statistical properties and b) Using auxiliary (external) data such as GPS measurements, multi-spectral observations, local meteorological models, and global atmospheric models.

On the other side, atmospheric noise might have some value for atmospheric research in meteorology because atmospheric artefacts signals are related to water vapour in the troposphere. The spatial resolution of the InSAR map for C-band satellites like Sentinel-1 without multi-looking is around 20 meters. That means InSAR can measure Precipitable Water Vapor (PWV) in the atmosphere in a 20m grid over hundreds of kilometres, which is much denser than other methods such as GNSS and space-borne passive sensors. However, the long revisit time of Sentinel-1 (temporal resolution, 12 days) at the moment is the main disadvantage of this technique from the meteorologists' side. Nevertheless, using the capability of InSAR to measure PWV in high spatial resolution is interesting for meteorological research.

== What is InSAR? ==
InSAR can provide accurate (millimeter-level) ground displacement fields for large areas over hundreds of kilometres. This technique uses two synthetic aperture radar images of the same area acquired at different times to measure surface motion between those times. Nevertheless, the result of interferometric synthetic-aperture radar in interferogram form includes actual displacement and other effects. Hence, these other effects must be calculated and removed from interferograms to achieve an accurate result of real ground displacement. Some of these errors have more influence, such as orbital errors, topographic effects and atmospheric artefacts. There are several methods to remove all these noises until a reasonable and acceptable amount except atmospheric effects with high accuracy. Thus, a significant challenge for the InSAR community remains atmospheric artefacts. Sometimes especially in areas with high humidity, the effect of atmospheric noise is much larger than geophysical events and prevents surface displacement detection.

== Atmospheric noise ==
In radar satellites, microwave signals are reflected off a persistent scatter in a target area, and their two-way travel time is measured by satellites. Water vapor in the troposphere and free electrons in the ionosphere affect the propagation of microwave signals through the atmosphere because the different refractive index in these layers affects the speed of propagation.

=== Ionosphere ===
Phase noise from the ionosphere, which occurs more with larger wavelengths, such as P or L-band radars, is a consequence of variations in free electron density in the 100–1000 km altitude along the travel path. Radar satellites with relatively long wavelengths like ALOS PALSAR 1/2 (L-band, λ=~24 cm) and NISAR are more vulnerable to ionospheric delays. However, this noise source is less powerful in C-Band (λ=5.6 cm) and X-band (λ=3.1 cm) SAR satellites such as Envisat, RADARSAT, ERS1/2 and TerraSAR-X and usually is negligible. There are several methods to remove the Ionospheric noise artifact:

1. Using auxiliary data like GNSS
2. Ionospheric weather models
3. Using azimuth shift
4. Split-spectrum methods

=== Troposphere ===
The troposphere is the lower layer of the atmosphere, with up to 90% of the atmosphere's water vapor. A height of 1.4 km from the ground surface contains 50% of the water vapor mass, and both on the global and local scales, most of the world's weather takes place in this layer. Therefore, the tropospheric path delays are caused by differences in temperature, atmospheric pressure, and the water vapor in the lower part of the atmosphere. Microwave atmospheric delay is a sum of the turbulent and vertical stratified components. The turbulent component can affect flat and mountainous terrains and is usually highly correlated in space and uncorrelated in time. On the other hand, the vertical stratified component with a high correlation to topography only influences areas with topography variations, such as hills or mountains. Although the tropospheric effect is regarded as noise in the InSAR community, it has great advantages in meteorology and enables scientists to predict and model water vapor in the troposphere. The propagationtion delay of electromagnetic waves of radar satellites in the troposphere will be explained in the following in terms of meteorology and the InSAR side.

==== Troposphere effect on InSAR ====
From the InSAR side, signal delay caused by variations of tropospheric properties in space and time is the source of major challenges for InSAR technique. In other words, tropospheric perturbation, caused by the differences in relative humidity, temperature, and pressure in the lower part of the troposphere between two acquisitions, can lead to additional noise in form of fringes up to 15–20 cm on interferograms. The atmospheric noise on InSAR results can include a wide range of wavelengths (short to long). Long wavelength errors, usually seen as a ramp (like a trend) in interferograms, are caused by changing the weather system in the study area very smoothly between two SAR images. Since this noise is similar to orbital ramp error and solid earth tides, detecting that in an interferogram is complicated. On the other hand, rapidly changing weather in a small area can cause artefacts signals that correlate with topography because water vapour variation in surface and altitudes is different. Moreover, a rain cloud in a small region can generate a turbulence error which would be visible like uplift or subsidence on interferogram. Overall, the tropospheric error on interferogram can be classified into space and time:

Tropospheric artefact	Space	Systematic	Stratified
Tropospheric artefact	Space	Stochastic	Turbulent
Tropospheric artefact	Time	Systematic	Seasonal
Tropospheric artefact	Time	Stochastic	Nonseasonal

- Vertical stratification: Vertical stratification is correlated with topography and can be seen wherever there are hills or mountains because the amount of water vapour is not constant near the surface and changes significantly with altitude. Hence, changing weather (water vapour) between two SAR images can cause delay and, thus, vertical stratification noise in the interferogram.
- Turbulence: Turbulent mixing consists of a short-scale (few km) components and is not directly correlated with topography and affects both flat terrains and higher altitude terrains.
- Seasonal (systematic) effect : Variation of moisture content of the atmosphere during different seasons may impose an artefact and bias the InSAR displacement time series. The large number of SAR acquisitions will not reduce the velocity bias necessarily. Nonetheless, the stratified tropospheric delay correction can mitigate the effects of the seasonal delay.

==== Troposphere effect on Meteorology ====
In terms of meteorology, tropospheric delay interestingly can be regarded as a useful tool for meteorology purposes. Traditional methods for measuring water vapor include using a) Meteorological stations, b) Radiosonde, c) Spectrometer, and d) GPS.In recent years, InSAR has enabled meteorological scientists to measure precipitable water vapour (PWV) in the atmosphere with high spatial resolution. Although InSAR temporal sampling (12 days for sentinel1) of atmosphere properties is coarser than the GPS (15 min), the main advantage of InSAR PWV maps is its high spatial resolution of up to a few meters (20 m). Therefore, meteorological scientists combine traditional GPS tomography of atmosphere with InSAR data (atmospheric part) to increase their models' temporal and spatial resolution.

== Tropospheric correction methods ==
The phase delay through the troposphere can be characterized by the refractivity (N).

$\Delta_{atm}=10^-6\int N(z)dz$ The atmospheric parameters can be used to calculate N(z) as the atmosphere's refractivity. This delay can be divided into two components: Dry delay and Wet delay. The dry delay, which is determined by the temperature and pressure of dry air, and the wet delay, which is determined mainly by the amount of water vapor in the troposphere.

$N_{tropo}= \Bigl(k_1\frac{P}{T}\Bigr)_{hydr} +\Bigl(K'_2\frac{e}{T} + k_3\frac{e}{T^2}\Bigr)_{wet}$

where P indicates total atmospheric pressure, T is the temperature and e is the partial pressure of water vapor. The coefficients k_{1} =0.776 K/Pa, k_{2} = 0.716 K/Pa, and k_{3} = 3.75 × 10^{3} K_{2}/Pa are called refractivity constants.

Since pressure varies with height, the dry part is correlated with the topography and can reach a 2.3–2.4 m delay in the zenith direction (zenith hydrostatic delay (ZHD)). Although the dry part significantly affects delay, this component is not a big challenge because the amount of that is relatively stable in terms of temporal and spatial in the atmosphere. Therefore, the differential of this component between two SAR images is almost zero. On the contrary, although the wet component (zenith wet delay (ZWD)) includes just 10% of the total delay (max =~30 cm ), this part is the major source of tropospheric noise in InSAR because water content moves in the troposphere and cause stratified and turbulent effect in the interferogram.

Therefore, the total delay is calculated by the integral of the wet and dry components in the line of sight (LOS) direction between the surface elevation and satellite:

$\delta L_{LOS}^s(z)=\frac{10^{-6}}{cos\theta}\{\frac{k_1R_d}{g_m}\bigl(P(z)-P(z_{ref}))+\int_{z}^{z_{re}} \Bigl(\Bigl(k_2-\frac{R_d}{R_v}k_1\Bigr)\frac{e}{T}+k_3\frac{e}{T^2}\Bigr)dz\}$

In this equation:

Variable	Name	Variable	Name
θ	Incidence angle (between vertical and radar wave propagation direction)	g_{m}	Weighted average of the gravity acceleration between z and z_{re}
Rd	Dry air specific gas constants = 287.05 J.kg^{−1}.K^{−1}	e	Water vapor partial pressure in Pa
Rv	Water vapor specific gas constants = 461.495 J.kg^{−1}.K^{−1}	p	Dry air partial pressure in Pa
T	Temperature in K		

Since there is no accurate technique that could determine the total refractivity on the same spatial scale and temporal sampling as the interferogram itself, various methods have been developed to measure for the atmospheric contribution within interferograms. In the following a couple of methods are introduced to mitigate tropospheric artefacts from interferograms:

=== Time series methods such as Persistent Scatter (PS) and Small Baseline Subset (SBAS) ===
Stacking has been one of the helpful strategies for reducing the tropospheric artefacts from interferograms. The stacking method processes several to hundreds of filtered and unwrapped interferograms together using different algorithms like Small Baseline Subset (SBAS) and persistent scatterer (PS) to measure surface displacement during a long period. These methods increase the signal-to-noise ratio of signals without any external information and are very useful for mitigating turbulence errors. The other advantage of this method is that it is independent of external data and straightforward to implement.

Limitation: For time series analysis approaches such as PS and SBAS, a large dataset has to be processed and this method mostly can reduce turbulent part of troposphere noise and signals of interest may be incorrectly removed. Thus, this method cannot be implemented only for one interferogram.

=== Estimated tropospheric delay from GNSS ===
GNSS uses microwave portion of the electromagnetic spectrum similar to SAR technique and both measurements are affected by the atmospheric delay and both provide geodetic measurements with comparable accuracy. Therefore, using interpolating GNSS observation (ِdense GNSS network) to estimate tropospheric delay can be a more accurate strategy to correct InSAR observations.

Limitation: Interpolation of zenith delay measurements requires dense GNSS network in the study area but GNSS stations are still sparsely distributed or even absent in many regions as well as this method only samples troposphere in the vicinity of individual GNSS sites. Moreover, GNSS datasets are still not freely available to the public in the many areas in the world.

=== Spectrometers Satellite (MERIS and MODIS) ===
Spectrometer measurements are Satellite-based observations from space allow estimating the atmospheric water vapor by band ratios in the near-infrared spectrum. This method has a relatively high spatial resolution to calculate the turbulent component of the atmospheric disturbance.

Limitation: Requires collocated sensors and cloud-free conditions and only available in daytime. Time differences between radar and Precipitable Water Vapor (PWV) data can be regarded as limitation. Moreover, the Spectrometer cannot estimate the atmosphere's dry component and calculate the wet part of the delay.

=== Numerical weather models (ERA5) ===
The advantage of this method is insensitive to the presence of clouds and Global/regional/ local coverage. By using the ERA, uncertainty in ZWD in high latitudes (> 30°), reach 1–2 cm, while uncertainty in low latitudes (< 30°), is about 2–6 cm. Most of studies reported varying degrees of success for using this method. Nonetheless, ERA-interim, and ERA5 global re-analysis models are popular models provided by the European Center for Medium-Range Weather Forecasting (ECMWF) and the HRES ECMWF forecast model. Moreover, the GACOS project aims to refine information from HRES with GNSS zenith delays if available.

Limitation: The low spatial resolution and the original mismatch in time between the model and the SAR acquisition do not permit addressing the turbulent component that takes place at lower Spatio-temporal scales. Moreover, complex data processing can be regarded as disadvantage of this method. Freely available Global Atmospheric Models such as ERA5 data are generated using Copernicus Climate Change Service Information developed for numerical weather prediction. These models can provide accurate and high-resolution (still is coarse for InSAR studies) parameters for characterizing the atmosphere state. Therefore, these methods are promising and practical techniques for atmospheric noise mitigation in InSAR technique. Based on the combination of different input datasets, the ERA5 is a global atmospheric model calculated by the European Center for Medium-Range Weather Forecasting (ECMWF). Several meteorological parameters are provided, such as pressure, temperature, and relative humidity, at hourly intervals with a horizontal resolution of 0.25 degrees and a vertical resolution of 37 intervals from sea level to 50 km.

This method estimates the atmospheric delay along the zenith path (vertical), and then, by using the incidence angle for each pixel, the zenith delay is converted to LOS direction. In order to obtain the phase delays for the entire SAR scene from the sparse grid points, two interpolations are implemented in horizontal and vertical directions. ERA5 data provides all the weather variables at 37 pressure levels (geopotential). First, the amount of delay is calculated in the signal path using cubic spline interpolation (vertical direction) and bilinear interpolation (horizontal direction). Then the total delay is projected to the LOS direction by calculating the cosine of the incidence angle for each pixel. Thus, after calculation $\phi_{trop}$ in first image t_{1} and second image t_{2}, and subtraction of the original interferogram ($\Delta\phi_{tot}$), the effect of atmospheric noise can be removed.

$\Delta\phi=\Delta\phi_{tot}-\bigl(\phi_{trop}^{t_2}-\phi_{trop}^{t_1}\bigr)$

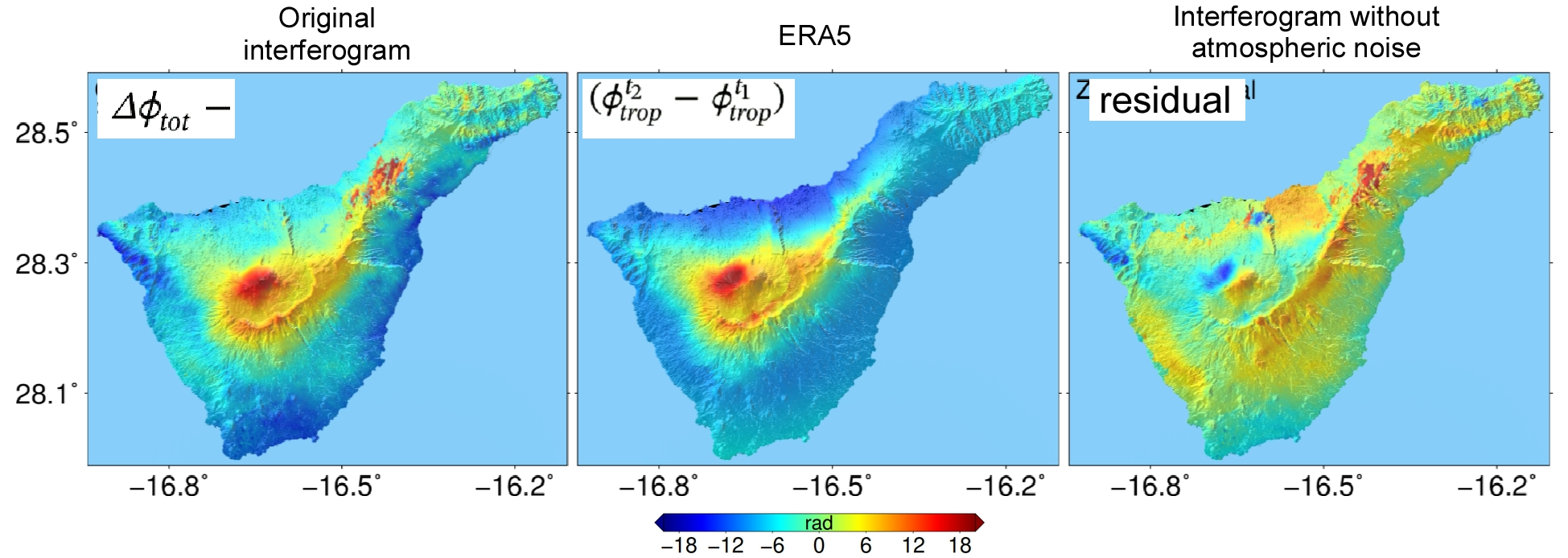
Atmospheric correction across the Tenerife. The original interferogram contains atmospheric noise; by using ERA5 data can remove the atmospheric artefact. The residual shows the interferogram without atmospheric noise.

It is worth mentioning that, the equation (see previous section) is an integration of zenithal path on the grid points of pressure, temperature and relative humidity to measure atmospheric phase delays. These parameters are available in the ERA5 data:

(ERA5 data download link)

Name	Variable	Name	Variable
divergence	d	specific_cloud_liquid_water_content	clwc
fraction_of_cloud_cover	cc	specific_humidity	q
geopotential	z	specific_rain_water_content	crwc
ozone_mass_mixing_ratio	o3	specific_snow_water_content	cswc
potential_vorticity	pv	temperature	t
relative_humidity	r	u_component_of_wind	u
specific_cloud_ice_water_content	ciwc	v_component_of_wind	v
vertical_velocity	w	vorticity	vo

Table 1. Variables of ERA5 data

=== Phase based empirical: (i) Linear correction (ii) Power-law correction ===
The correlation analysis between the interferometric phase and topography can recognize the amount of topography-correlated (stratified component). In other words, the correlation between range change in the LOS direction of InSAR and topography are related to the path length traveled by the electromagnetic wave. Estimation of linear and power-law relationships between the interferometric phase and the topography can be used to remove stratified parts of the troposphere. Hence, investigating the phase-elevation relationship with mathematical methods such as regression can enable us to recognize the atmospheric error in interferograms.

Limitation: The main limitation of these model is that other phase terms (e.g., turbulent atmospheric artefacts, deformation related phase, decorrelation noise) can influence the estimate of the coefficient that relates phase with elevation. This method ignores the spatial variability of tropospheric signals and can be easily biased by orbit and topographic errors.

== Available packages for atmospheric correction ==
Terrain: TRAIN consists of MATLAB and shell scripts and can be used for the output of most InSAR software. (click on the link )

PyAPS: This module has been written based on python 3 and can measure the stratified atmosphere noise for interferograms. This module uses ERA5 data for correction. (click on the link )

RAiDER: This python package implements the raytracing method to measure and reduce tropospheric noise. (click on the link )

GACOS: This package in MATLAB generates high-resolution atmospheric data and then separates stratified and turbulent signals to remove tropospheric noise. This method uses the Iterative Tropospheric Decomposition (ITD) model. (click on the link )

ICAMS: This python module uses ERA5 data and considers stochastic spatial properties of the troposphere (ICAMS) to remove tropospheric noise.This package calculates the delays along the LOS direction. (click on the link )

== Summary ==
Characterizing atmospheric noise remains a challenge in the InSAR community, and addressing it helps researchers to take full advantage of the InSAR technique.

All methods to mitigate this noise have limitations; sometimes, combining techniques gives a better result, and there is no best exclusive method for reducing tropospheric delays at the moment.

Global measurements of tectonic/volcanic deformation commonly benefit from global atmospheric corrections. Although ECMWF data, like ERA5, provides global data, the low spatial resolution of it regarded as a drawback and can cause uncertainty.

== See also ==
- InSAR technique
- Atmosphere of Earth
- Meteorology
