= Interferometric synthetic-aperture radar =

Geodesy and remote sensing technique

Interferometric synthetic aperture radar, abbreviated InSAR (or deprecated IfSAR), is a radar technique used in geodesy and remote sensing. This geodetic method uses two or more synthetic aperture radar (SAR) images to generate maps of surface deformation or digital elevation, using differences in the phase of the waves returning to the satellite or aircraft. The technique can potentially measure millimetre-scale changes in deformation over spans of days to years. It has applications for geophysical monitoring of natural hazards, for example earthquakes, volcanoes and landslides, and in structural engineering, in particular monitoring of subsidence and structural stability.

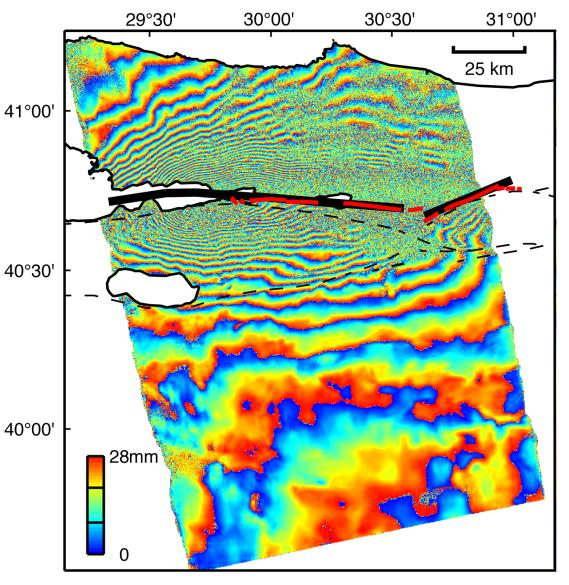
Interferogram produced using ERS-2 data from 13 August and 17 September 1999, spanning the 1999 İzmit earthquake. (NASA/JPL-Caltech)

== Technique ==
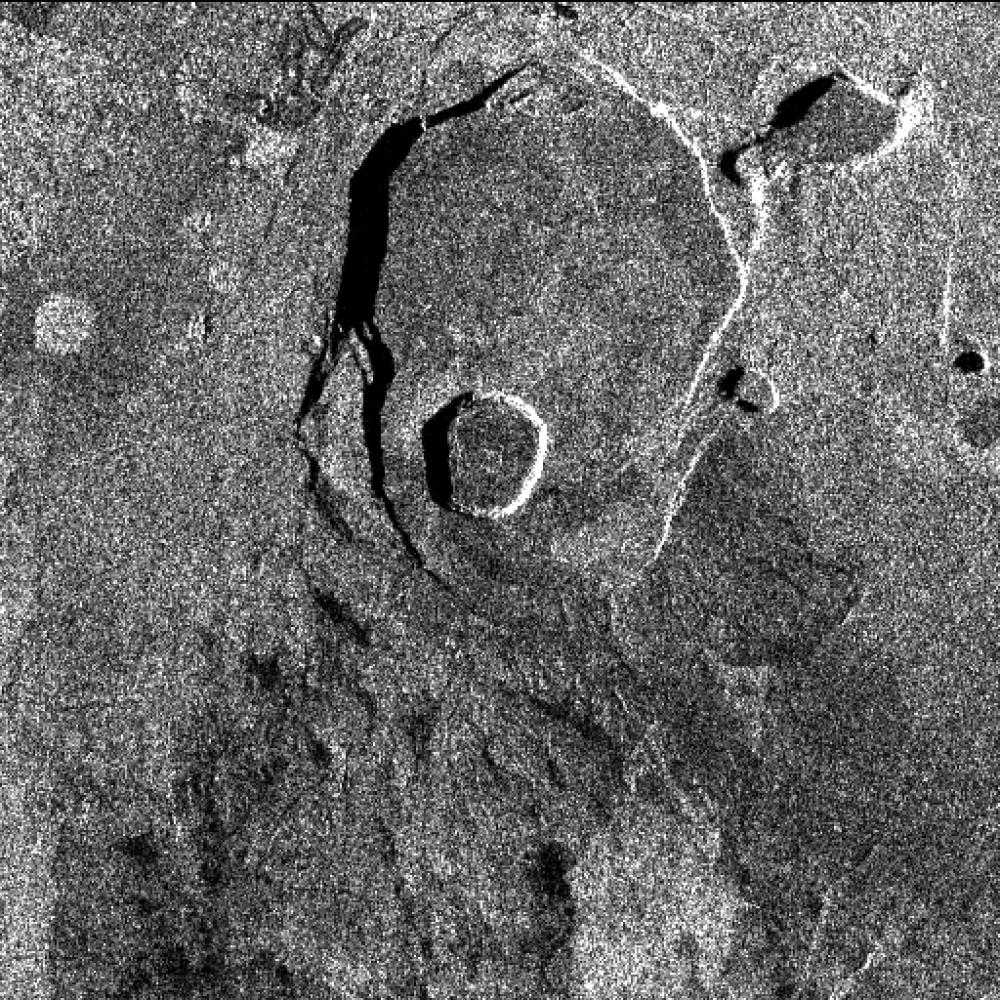
SAR amplitude image of Kīlauea (NASA/JPL-Caltech)

=== Synthetic aperture radar ===
Synthetic aperture radar (SAR) is a form of radar in which sophisticated processing of radar data is used to produce a very narrow effective beam. It can be used to form images of relatively immobile targets; moving targets can be blurred or displaced in the formed images. SAR is a form of active remote sensing – the antenna transmits radiation that is reflected from the image area, as opposed to passive sensing, where the reflection is detected from ambient illumination. SAR image acquisition is therefore independent of natural illumination and images can be taken at night. Radar uses electromagnetic radiation at microwave frequencies; the atmospheric absorption at typical radar wavelengths is very low, meaning observations are not prevented by cloud cover.

=== Phase ===
Phase difference

SAR makes use of the amplitude and the absolute phase of the return signal data. In contrast, interferometry uses differential phase of the reflected radiation, either from multiple passes along the same trajectory and/or from multiple displaced phase centers (antennas) on a single pass. Since the outgoing wave is produced by the satellite, the phase is known, and can be compared to the phase of the return signal. The phase of the return wave depends on the distance to the ground, since the path length to the ground and back will consist of a number of whole wavelengths plus some fraction of a wavelength. This is observable as a phase difference or phase shift in the returning wave. The total distance to the satellite (i.e., the number of whole wavelengths) is known based on the time that it takes for the energy to make the round trip back to the satellite—but it is the extra fraction of a wavelength that is of particular interest and is measured to great accuracy.

In practice, the phase of the return signal is affected by several factors, which together can make the absolute phase return in any SAR data collection essentially arbitrary, with no correlation from pixel to pixel. To get any useful information from the phase, some of these effects must be isolated and removed. Interferometry uses two images of the same area taken from the same position (or, for topographic applications, slightly different positions) and finds the difference in phase between them, producing an image known as an interferogram. This is measured in radians of phase difference and, because of the cyclic nature of phase, is recorded as repeating fringes that each represent a full 2π cycle.

=== Factors affecting phase ===
The most important factor affecting the phase is the interaction with the ground surface. The phase of the wave may change on reflection, depending on the properties of the material. The reflected signal back from any one pixel is the summed contribution to the phase from many smaller 'targets' in that ground area, each with different dielectric properties and distances from the satellite, meaning the returned signal is arbitrary and completely uncorrelated with that from adjacent pixels. Importantly though, it is consistent – provided nothing on the ground changes the contributions from each target should sum identically each time, and hence be removed from the interferogram.

Once the ground effects have been removed, the major signal present in the interferogram is a contribution from orbital effects. For interferometry to work, the satellites must be as close as possible to the same spatial position when the images are acquired. This means that images from two satellite platforms with different orbits cannot be compared, and for a given satellite data from the same orbital track must be used. In practice the perpendicular distance between them, known as the baseline, is often known to within a few centimetres but can only be controlled on a scale of tens to hundreds of metres. This slight difference causes a regular difference in phase that changes smoothly across the interferogram and can be modelled and removed.

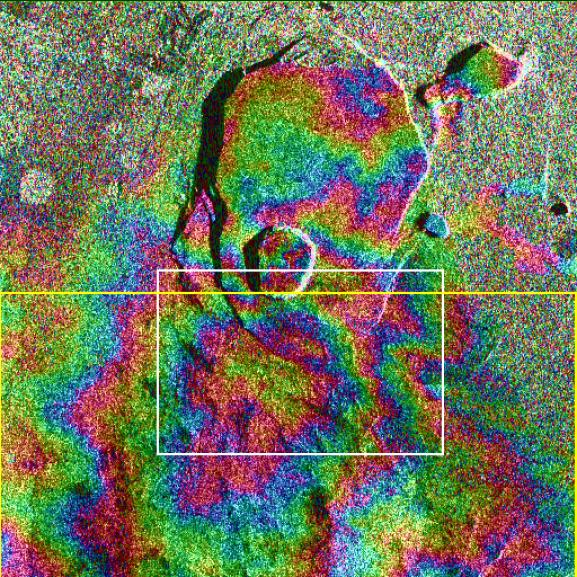
Corresponding interferogram of Kīlauea, showing topographic fringes (NASA/JPL-Caltech)

The slight difference in satellite position also alters the distortion caused by topography, meaning an extra phase difference is introduced by a stereoscopic effect. The longer the baseline, the smaller the topographic height needed to produce a fringe of phase change – known as the altitude of ambiguity. This effect can be exploited to calculate the topographic height, and used to produce a digital elevation model (DEM).

If the height of the topography is already known, the topographic phase contribution can be calculated and removed. This has traditionally been done in two ways. In the two-pass method, elevation data from an externally derived DEM is used in conjunction with the orbital information to calculate the phase contribution. In the three-pass method two images acquired a short time apart are used to create an interferogram, which is assumed to have no deformation signal and therefore represent the topographic contribution. This interferogram is then subtracted from a third image with a longer time separation to give the residual phase due to deformation.

Once the ground, orbital and topographic contributions have been removed the interferogram contains the deformation signal, along with any remaining noise (see Difficulties below). The signal measured in the interferogram represents the change in phase caused by an increase or decrease in distance from the ground pixel to the satellite, therefore only the component of the ground motion parallel to the satellite line of sight vector will cause a phase difference to be observed. For sensors like ERS with a small incidence angle this measures vertical motion well, but is insensitive to horizontal motion perpendicular to the line of sight (approximately north–south). It also means that vertical motion and components of horizontal motion parallel to the plane of the line of sight (approximately east–west) cannot be separately resolved.

One fringe of phase difference is generated by a ground motion of half the radar wavelength, since this corresponds to a whole wavelength increase in the two-way travel distance. Phase shifts are only resolvable relative to other points in the interferogram. Absolute deformation can be inferred by assuming one area in the interferogram (for example a point away from expected deformation sources) experienced no deformation, or by using a ground control (GPS or similar) to establish the absolute movement of a point.

=== Difficulties ===
A variety of factors govern the choice of images which can be used for interferometry. The simplest is data availability – radar instruments used for interferometry commonly don't operate continuously, acquiring data only when programmed to do so. For future requirements it may be possible to request acquisition of data, but for many areas of the world archived data may be sparse. Data availability is further constrained by baseline criteria. Availability of a suitable DEM may also be a factor for two-pass InSAR; commonly 90 m SRTM data may be available for many areas, but at high latitudes or in areas of poor coverage alternative datasets must be found.

A fundamental requirement of the removal of the ground signal is that the sum of phase contributions from the individual targets within the pixel remains constant between the two images and is completely removed. However, there are several factors that can cause this criterion to fail. Firstly the two images must be accurately co-registered to a sub-pixel level to ensure that the same ground targets are contributing to that pixel. There is also a geometric constraint on the maximum length of the baseline – the difference in viewing angles must not cause phase to change over the width of one pixel by more than a wavelength. The effects of topography also influence the condition, and baselines need to be shorter if terrain gradients are high. Where co-registration is poor or the maximum baseline is exceeded the pixel phase will become incoherent – the phase becomes essentially random from pixel to pixel rather than varying smoothly, and the area appears noisy. This is also true for anything else that changes the contributions to the phase within each pixel, for example changes to the ground targets in each pixel caused by vegetation growth, landslides, agriculture or snow cover.

Another source of error present in most interferograms is caused by the propagation of the waves through the atmosphere. If the wave travelled through vacuum, it should theoretically be possible (subject to sufficient accuracy of timing) to use the two-way travel-time of the wave in combination with the phase to calculate the exact distance to the ground. However, the velocity of the wave through the atmosphere is lower than the speed of light in vacuum, and depends on air temperature, pressure and the partial pressure of water vapour. It is this unknown phase delay that prevents the integer number of wavelengths being calculated. If the atmosphere was horizontally homogeneous over the length scale of an interferogram and vertically over that of the topography then the effect would simply be a constant phase difference between the two images which, since phase difference is measured relative to other points in the interferogram, would not contribute to the signal. However, the atmosphere is laterally heterogeneous on length scales both larger and smaller than typical deformation signals. This spurious signal can appear completely unrelated to the surface features of the image, however, in other cases the atmospheric phase delay is caused by vertical inhomogeneity at low altitudes and this may result in fringes appearing to correspond with the topography.

=== Persistent scatterer InSAR ===
Persistent or permanent scatterer techniques are a relatively recent development from conventional InSAR, and rely on studying pixels which remain coherent over a sequence of interferograms. In 1999, researchers at Politecnico di Milano, Italy, developed a new multi-image approach in which one searches the stack of images for objects on the ground providing consistent and stable radar reflections back to the satellite. These objects could be the size of a pixel or, more commonly, sub-pixel sized, and are present in every image in the stack. That specific implementation is patented.

Some research centres and companies, were inspired to develop variations of their own algorithms which would also overcome InSAR's limitations. In scientific literature, these techniques are collectively referred to as persistent scatterer interferometry or PSI techniques. The term persistent scatterer interferometry (PSI) was proposed by European Space Agency (ESA) to define the second generation of radar interferometry techniques. This term is nowadays commonly accepted by scientific and the end user community.

Commonly such techniques are most useful in urban areas with many permanent structures, for example the PSI studies of European geohazard sites undertaken by the Terrafirma project. The Terrafirma project provides a ground motion hazard information service, distributed throughout Europe via national geological surveys and institutions. The objective of this service is to help save lives, improve safety, and reduce economic loss through the use of state-of-the-art PSI information. Over the last 9 years this service has supplied information relating to urban subsidence and uplift, slope stability and landslides, seismic and volcanic deformation, coastlines and flood plains.

== Producing interferograms ==
The processing chain used to produce interferograms varies according to the software used and the precise application but will usually include some combination of the following steps.

Two SAR images are required to produce an interferogram; these may be obtained pre-processed, or produced from raw data by the user prior to InSAR processing. The two images must first be co-registered, using a correlation procedure to find the offset and difference in geometry between the two amplitude images. One SAR image is then re-sampled to match the geometry of the other, meaning each pixel represents the same ground area in both images. The interferogram is then formed by cross-multiplication of each pixel in the two images, and the interferometric phase due to the curvature of the Earth is removed, a process referred to as flattening. For deformation applications a DEM can be used in conjunction with the baseline data to simulate the contribution of the topography to the interferometric phase, this can then be removed from the interferogram.

Once the basic interferogram has been produced, it is commonly filtered using an adaptive power-spectrum filter to amplify the phase signal. For most quantitative applications the consecutive fringes present in the interferogram will then have to be unwrapped, which involves interpolating over the 0 to 2π phase jumps to produce a continuous deformation field. At some point, before or after unwrapping, incoherent areas of the image may be masked out. The final processing stage involves geocoding the image, which resamples the interferogram from the acquisition geometry (related to direction of satellite path) into the desired geographic projection.

=== Hardware ===
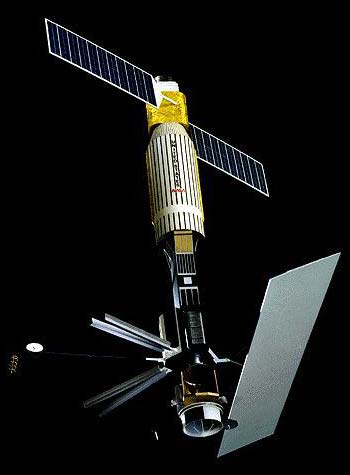
Seasat (NASA/JPL-Caltech)

==== Spaceborne ====
Early exploitation of satellite-based InSAR included use of Seasat data in the 1980s, but the potential of the technique was expanded in the 1990s, with the launch of ERS-1 (1991), JERS-1 (1992), RADARSAT-1 and ERS-2 (1995). These platforms provided the stable, well-defined orbits and short baselines necessary for InSAR. More recently, the 11-day NASA STS-99 mission in February 2000 used a SAR antenna mounted on the Space Shuttle to gather data for the Shuttle Radar Topography Mission (SRTM). In 2002 ESA launched the ASAR instrument, designed as a successor to ERS, aboard Envisat. While the majority of InSAR to date has utilized the C-band sensors, recent missions such as the ALOS PALSAR, TerraSAR-X and COSMO-SkyMed are expanding the available data in the L- and X-band.

Sentinel-1A and Sentinel-1B, both C-band sensors, were launched by the ESA in 2014 and 2016, respectively. Together, they provide InSAR coverage on a global scale and on a six-day repeat cycle.

==== Airborne ====
Airborne InSAR data acquisition systems are built by companies such as the American Intermap, the German AeroSensing, and the Brazilian OrbiSat.

==== Terrestrial or ground-based ====
A deformation plot showing slope instability using Terrestrial InSAR

Terrestrial or ground-based SAR interferometry (TInSAR or GBInSAR) is a remote sensing technique for the displacement monitoring of slopes, rock scarps, volcanoes, landslides, buildings, infrastructures etc. This technique is based on the same operational principles of the satellite SAR interferometry, but the synthetic aperture of the radar (SAR) is obtained by an antenna moving on a rail instead of a satellite moving around an orbit. SAR technique allows 2D radar image of the investigated scenario to be achieved, with a high range resolution (along the instrumental line of sight) and cross-range resolution (along the scan direction). Two antennas respectively emit and receive microwave signals and, by calculating the phase difference between two measurements taken in two different times, it is possible to compute the displacement of all the pixels of the SAR image. The accuracy in the displacement measurement is of the same order of magnitude as the EM wavelength and depends also on the specific local and atmospheric conditions.

== Applications ==
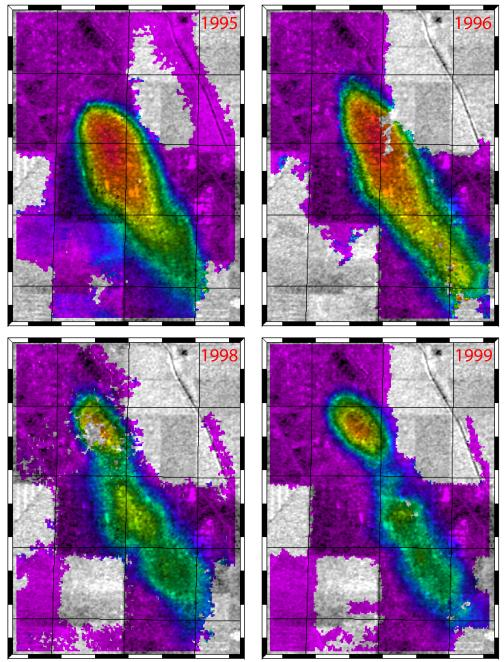
Rapid ground subsidence over the Lost Hills oil field in California. (NASA/JPL-Caltech)

=== Tectonic ===
InSAR can be used to measure tectonic deformation, for example ground movements due to earthquakes. It was first used for the 1992 Landers earthquake, but has since been utilised extensively for a wide variety of earthquakes all over the world. In particular the 1999 Izmit and 2003 Bam earthquakes were extensively studied. InSAR can also be used to monitor creep and strain accumulation on faults.

=== Volcanic ===
InSAR can be used in a variety of volcanic settings, including deformation associated with eruptions, inter-eruption strain caused by changes in magma distribution at depth, gravitational spreading of volcanic edifices, and volcano-tectonic deformation signals. Early work on volcanic InSAR included studies on Mount Etna, and Kilauea, with many more volcanoes being studied as the field developed. The technique is now widely used for academic research into volcanic deformation, although its use as an operational monitoring technique for volcano observatories has been limited by issues such as orbital repeat times, lack of archived data, coherence and atmospheric errors. Recently InSAR has been used to study rifting processes in Ethiopia.

=== Subsidence ===
Ground subsidence from a variety of causes has been successfully measured using InSAR, in particular subsidence caused by oil or water extraction from underground reservoirs, subsurface mining and collapse of old mines. Thus, InSAR has become an indispensable tool to satisfactorily address many subsidence studies. Tomás et al. performed a cost analysis that allowed to identify the strongest points of InSAR techniques compared with other conventional techniques: (1) higher data acquisition frequency and spatial coverage; and (2) lower annual cost per measurement point and per square kilometre.

=== Landslides ===
Although InSAR technique can present some limitations when applied to landslides, it can also be used for monitoring landscape features such as landslides.

Tomás et al. conducted a bibliometric study on the trends in publications related to landslides and InSAR. They found that the publication trends follow a power model, indicating that despite its inception in the last century, InSAR is a growing topical issue and has become established as a valuable tool for studying landslides.

=== Ice flow ===
Glacial motion and deformation have been successfully measured using satellite interferometry. The technique allows remote, high-resolution measurement of changes in glacial structure, ice flow, and shifts in ice dynamics, all of which agree closely with ground observations.

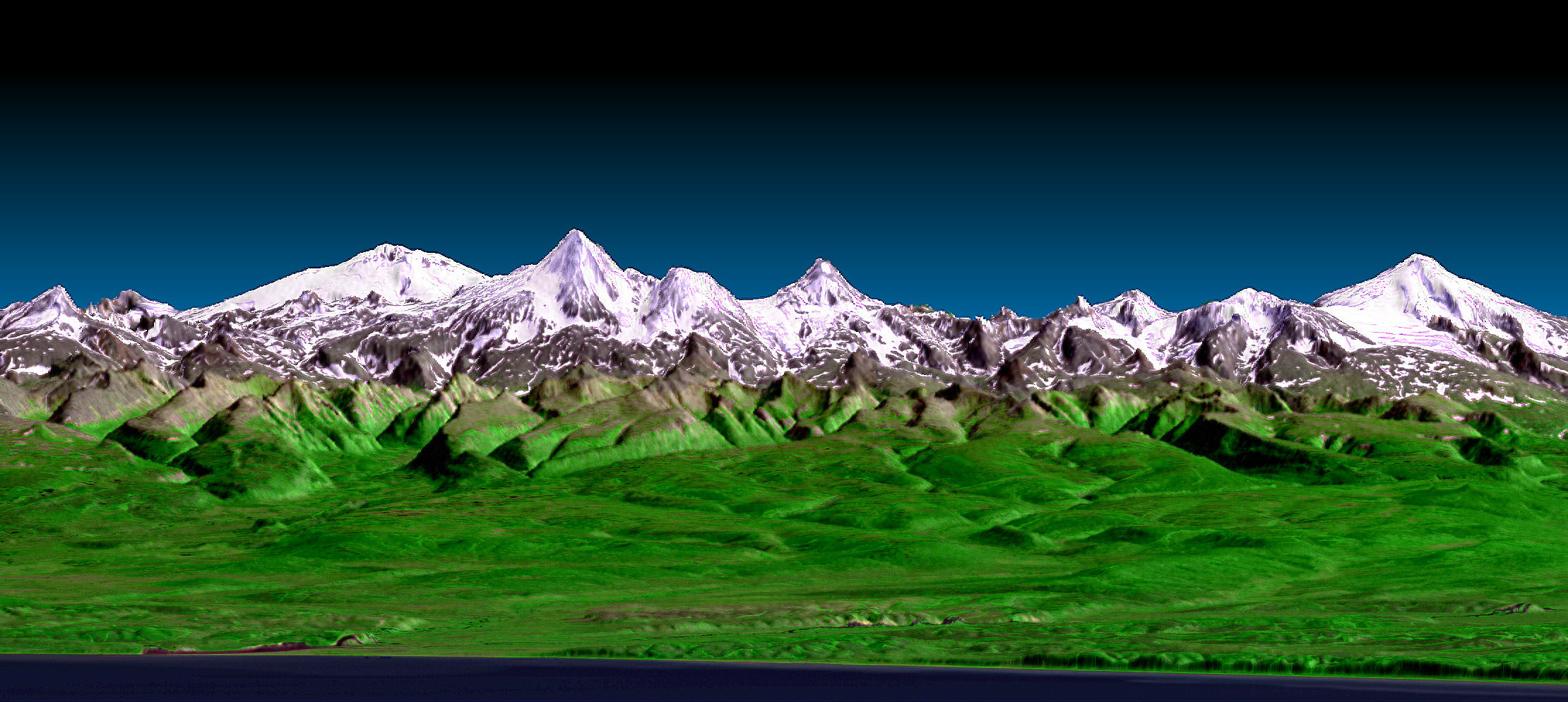
Kamchatka Peninsula, Landsat data draped over SRTM digital elevation model (NASA/JPL-Caltech)

=== Infrastructure and building monitoring ===
InSAR can also be used to monitor the stability of built structures. Very high resolution SAR data (such as derived from the TerraSAR-X StripMap mode or COSMO-Skymed HIMAGE mode) are especially suitable for this task. InSAR is used for monitoring highway and railway settlements, dike stability, forensic engineering and many other uses.

=== DEM generation ===
Interferograms can be used to produce digital elevation maps (DEMs) using the stereoscopic effect caused by slight differences in observation position between the two images. When using two images produced by the same sensor with a separation in time, it must be assumed other phase contributions (for example from deformation or atmospheric effects) are minimal. In 1995 the two ERS satellites flew in tandem with a one-day separation for this purpose. A second approach is to use two antennas mounted some distance apart on the same platform, and acquire the images at the same time, which ensures no atmospheric or deformation signals are present. This approach was followed by NASA's SRTM mission aboard the Space Shuttle in 2000. InSAR-derived DEMs can be used for later two-pass deformation studies, or for use in other geophysical applications.

=== Mapping and classification of active deformation areas ===
Various procedures have been developed to semi-automatically identify clusters of active persistent scatterers, usually referred to as active deformation areas, and preliminarily associate them with different potential types of deformational processes (e.g., landslides, sinkholes, building settlements, land subsidence) across wide areas.

== See also ==
- Coherence (physics)
- Optical heterodyne detection
- Remote sensing
- ROI PAC
