= ROI PAC =

ROI_PAC is a software package created by the Jet Propulsion Laboratory division of NASA and Caltech for processing SAR images to create InSAR images, named interferograms. ROI_PAC stands for Repeat Orbit Interferometry PACkage. It is a UNIX based software package.

Although many sources exist discussing how to install and use the basic features of the program, there was never a complete user manual created on how to use the software.

== See also ==
- Interferometry
