= SRB-A =

Family of Japanese solid rocket boosters

SRB-A / SRB-3
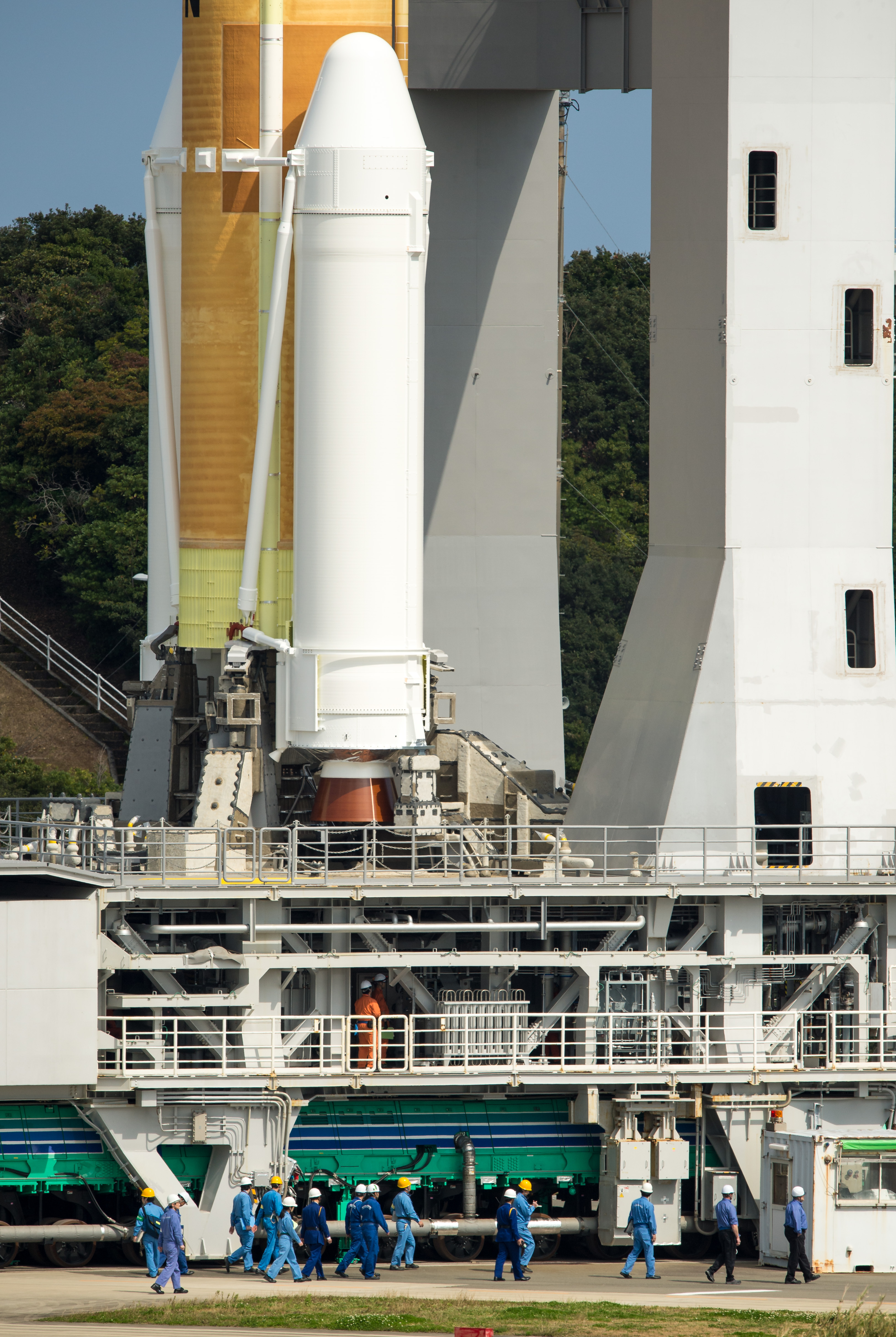
- Closeup of the SRB-A attached to the H-IIA rocket which launched the Global Precipitation Measurement spacecraft
- Manufacturer: IHI Corporation
- Country of origin: Japan
- Used on: SRB-A: H-IIA, H-IIB, Epsilon; SRB-3: H3, Epsilon S

SRB-A
- Height: 14.6 m (47 ft 11 in)
- Diameter: 2.5 m (8 ft 2 in)
- Gross mass: 75.5 t (166,449 lb)
- Propellant mass: 66.8 t (147,269 lb)
- Maximum thrust: 2,300 kN (517,061 lb_{f})
- Specific impulse: 283.6 s (2.781 km/s)
- Burn time: 110 seconds

SRB-3
- Height: 15 m (49 ft)
- Diameter: 2.5 m (8 ft 2 in)
- Gross mass: 76.2 t (168,000 lb)
- Propellant mass: 67.2 t (148,000 lb)
- Maximum thrust: 2,300 kN (520,000 lb_{f})
- Specific impulse: 283.6 s (2.781 km/s)
- Burn time: 110 seconds

The SRB-A and SRB-3 are a family of Japanese solid-fueled rocket boosters developed and manufactured by IHI Corporation for use on the H-IIA, H-IIB, Epsilon, H3, and Epsilon S launch vehicles. The earlier versions, designated SRB-A, flew from 2001 to 2025, while the successor SRB-3 made its first flight in 2023.

== Design ==
All SRB variants have a composite motor case constructed from carbon-fiber-reinforced polymer materials, with thrust vector control provided by electrically actuated nozzles. IHI led development and production, with contributions from other Japanese manufacturers: the composite propellant (BP-208) was developed by NOF Corporation, and the T1000GB carbon fiber used in the motor case was developed by Toray.

The SRB-A motor case incorporated foreign technology licensed from Alliant Techsystems (ATK), based on the Castor 120 motor used in the LGM-118 Peacekeeper ICBM. By contrast, the SRB-3 uses a fully domestic motor case design developed in Japan.

== SRB-A series ==
The SRB-A was developed for the H-IIA rocket and first flew in 2001. It was later used on the larger H-IIB and as the first stage of the smaller Epsilon rocket. It measured 2.5 metres (8 ft 2 in) in diameter and 15.1 metres (50 ft) in length, with a filament-wound composite casing. It replaced the SRBs used on the earlier H-II rocket.

=== Variants ===
- SRB-A — The initial version, used on the first six H-IIA launches. A separation failure on the sixth launch in 2003 led to loss of mission.
- SRB-A2 — A planned upgrade canceled after the 2003 failure; its design changes were merged into the SRB-A Improved.
- SRB-A Improved — Incorporated a redesigned bell-shaped nozzle to reduce erosion, with slightly lower thrust and longer burn time. Used on the seventh through thirteenth H-IIA flights, but nozzle erosion persisted.
- SRB-A3 — Final SRB-A version, with further improvements to reliability and performance. Available in a high-thrust or long-burn variant. Used on all H-IIA launches after the thirteenth flight, as well as on the H-IIB and as the first stage of the Epsilon rocket.

The SRB-A series was retired in 2025 and replaced by the SRB-3.

== SRB-3 ==
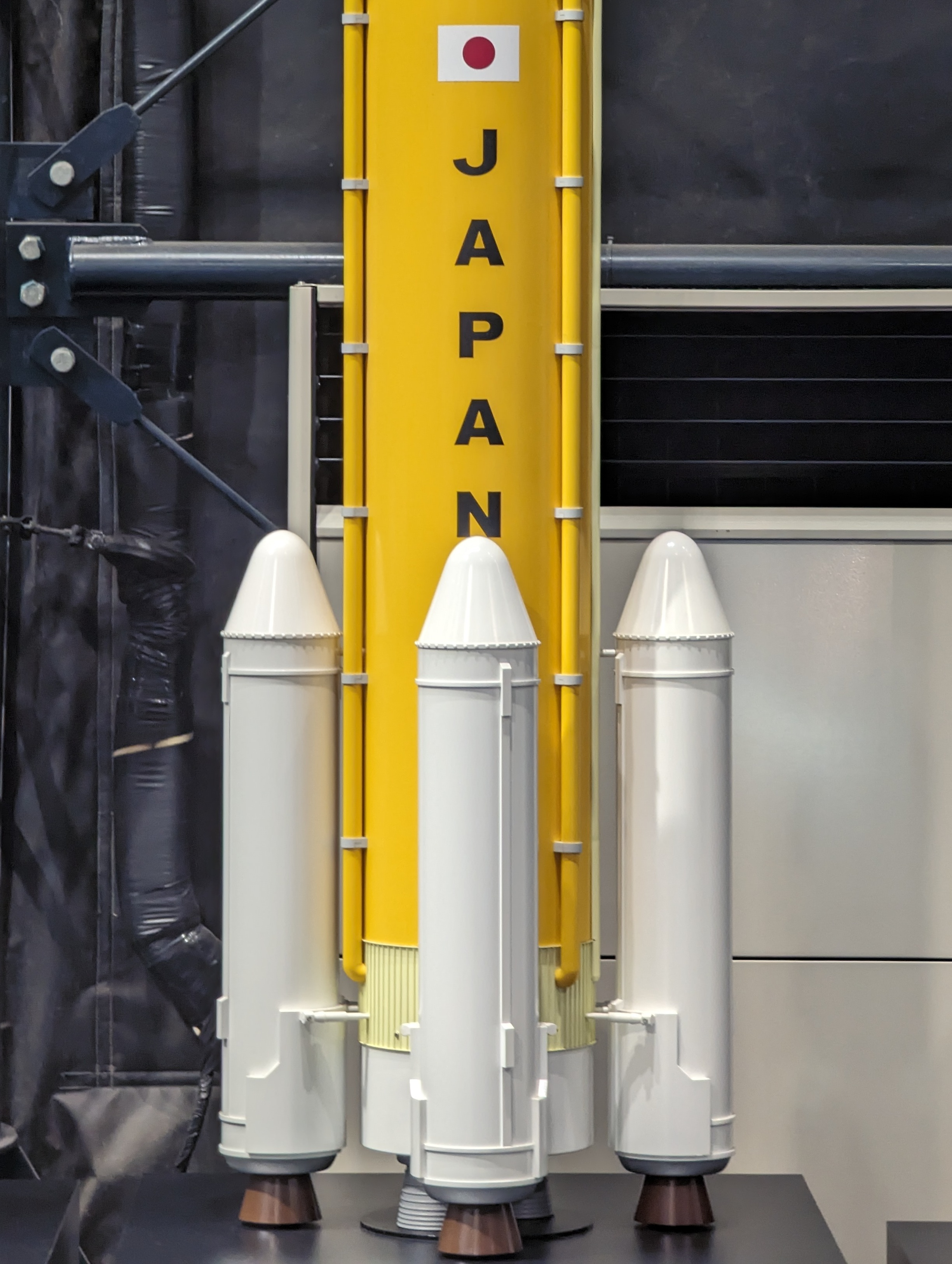
Closeup of SRB-3 models attached to a model H3 rocket

The SRB-3 is the current generation of Japanese solid rocket boosters, developed for the H3 and Epsilon S launch vehicles. Compared to the SRB-A, it carries 1 tonne (2,200 lb) more propellant, uses a fixed nozzle, and incorporates a simplified separation system to reduce cost and increase reliability.

Unlike the SRB-A series, which required different burn patterns depending on configuration and vehicle type, the SRB-3 uses a unified burn pattern whether flown in pairs or quartets on the H3, or as the first stage of the Epsilon S.
