= HTV-X2 =

Planned cargo spacecraft

- Mission type: ISS resupply
- Operator: JAXA
- Mission duration: ~30 days

Spacecraft properties
- Spacecraft type: HTV-X
- Manufacturer: Mitsubishi Heavy Industries
- Launch mass: 16,000 kg (35,000 lb)
- Dimensions: 8.0 × 4.4 m (26.2 × 14.4 ft)
- Power: 3.0 kW

Start of mission
- Launch date: NET 2027 (planned)
- Rocket: H3-24W
- Launch site: Tanegashima, LA-Y2
- Contractor: Mitsubishi Heavy Industries

End of mission
- Disposal: Deorbited

Orbital parameters
- Reference system: Geocentric
- Regime: Low Earth
- Inclination: 51.6°

Berthing at ISS
- Berthing port: Harmony nadir

Cargo
- Pressurised: 4,069 kg (8,971 lb)
- Unpressurised: 1,750 kg (3,860 lb)

HTV-X2 is the second flight of HTV-X, an uncrewed expendable cargo spacecraft to resupply International Space Station. It is planned to be launched no earlier than 2027.

== Payload ==
As of 2021, HTV-X2 was planned to carry JAXA Docking System (JDS) in the unpressurised cargo section, which is compatible with International Docking System Standard (IDSS). It is planned to demonstrate automated docking to the Pressurized Mating Adapter (PMA) at Harmony zenith port after release from berthing at the Harmony nadir port. However, the mission may be carried over to a later flight of HTV-X.
