= HTV-X =

Uncrewed cargo spacecraft developed by JAXA

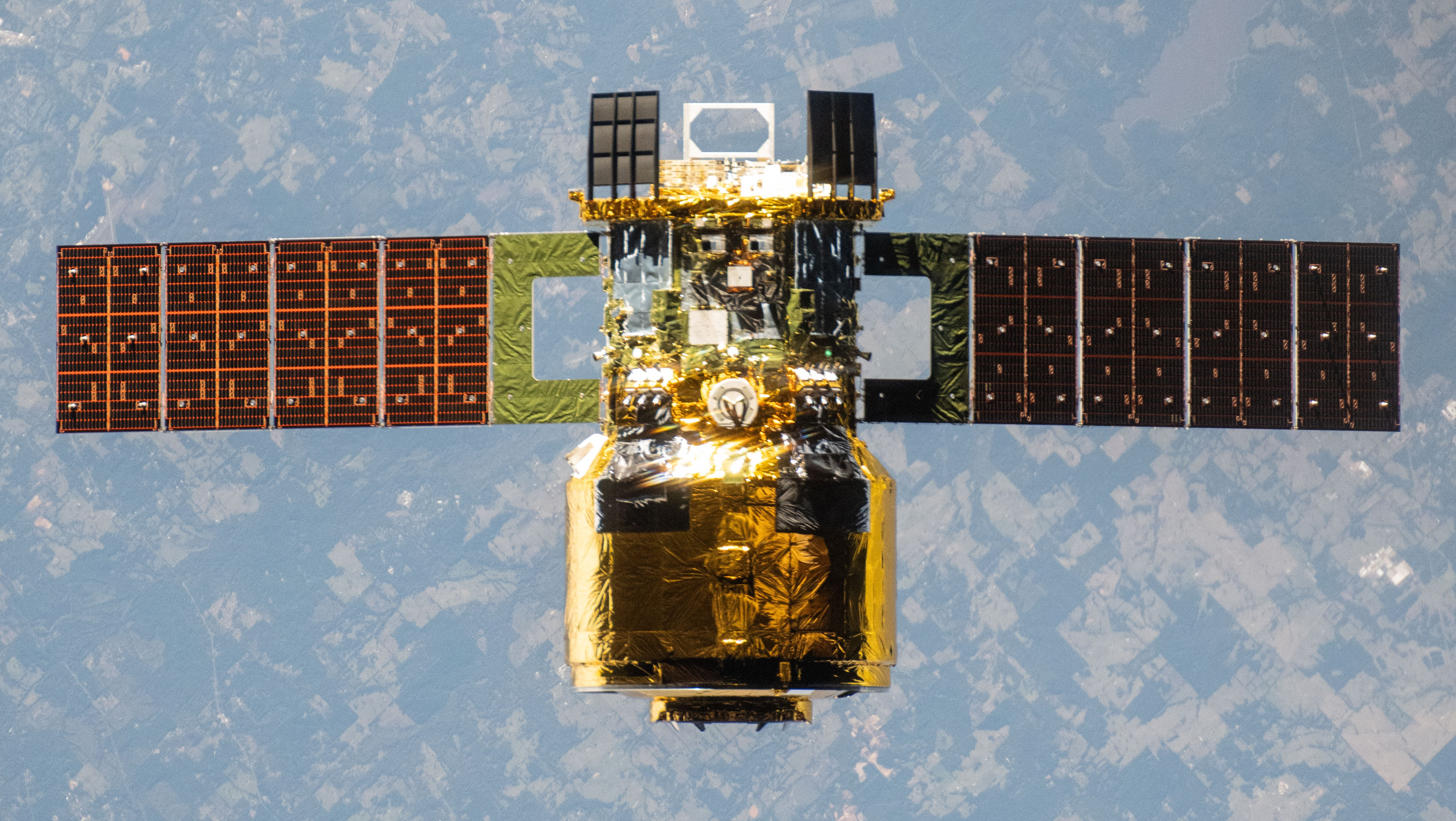
- HTV-X1 on approach to the International Space Station
- Manufacturer: Mitsubishi Heavy Industries
- Country of origin: Japan
- Operator: JAXA
- Applications: ISS resupply
- Website: Official website

Specifications
- Spacecraft type: Cargo
- Launch mass: 16,000 kg (35,000 lb)
- Payload capacity: Pressurised: 4,070 kg (8,970 lb); Unpressurised: 1,750 kg (3,860 lb)
- Volume: Pressurised: 39.6 m^{3} (1,400 cu ft); Total: 78 m^{3} (2,800 cu ft)
- Power: Solar panel generation: 1 kW; Max. battery output: 3 kW
- Design life: 6 months (berthed to ISS); 1.5 years (after departure from ISS)

Dimensions
- Height: 8 m (26 ft 3 in)
- Diameter: 4.4 m (14 ft 5 in)
- Solar array span: 18.2 m (60 ft)

Production
- Status: Active
- Planned: 2
- Launched: 1
- Operational: 1
- Maiden launch: 26 October 2025 (HTV‑X1)

Related spacecraft
- Derived from: H-II Transfer Vehicle
- Launch vehicle: H3

HTV-X, also known as the New Space Station Resupply Vehicle (Japanese: 新型宇宙ステーション補給機, Hepburn: Shingata Uchū Sutēshon Hokyūki), is a Japanese cargo spacecraft of JAXA. The successor to the H-II Transfer Vehicle (HTV) for International Space Station (ISS) resupply missions, it was first launched on 26 October 2025.

== Background ==
The HTV-X is manufactured by Mitsubishi Heavy Industries with contributions from Mitsubishi Electric. IHI Aerospace provides the propulsion system and American company Sierra Nevada Corporation provides the Common Berthing Mechanism and hatch kit.

== Design ==
HTV-X consists of three main modules, arranged from top to bottom on the launch pad:

- Unpressurized Cargo Support System (UPCSS): Unpressurized cargo is mounted externally on top of Service Module, rather than inside the spacecraft, allowing larger items limited only by the launch vehicle fairing and increasing capacity compared to the original HTV.
- Service Module (SM): A 2.7-metre-long (8 ft 10 in) unit capable of independent operation. It includes two deployable solar arrays generating 1 kW of power (replacing the original HTV's 200 W side-mounted panels), batteries with a 3 kW peak output (up from 2 kW), and upgraded communications with a 1 Mbit/s link alongside the previous 8 kbit/s channel. HTV-X omits a main engine, using a ring of reaction control system (RCS) thrusters for propulsion, and mounts some components externally for easier astronaut access.
- Pressurised Module (PM): A 3.5-metre-long (11 ft 6 in) section with an internal volume of 39.6 cubic metres (1,400 cu ft) and a payload capacity of 4,070 kilograms (8,970 lb). Identical in design to the original HTV, it is positioned at the bottom of the stack to improve mass distribution.

The HTV-X measures 8 metres (26 ft 3 in) in length. It is launched by the H3 rocket with a payload fairing widened to 5.4 metres (18 ft) (in contrast to normal 5.2 metres (17 ft)), and Payload Adapter Fitting (PAF) widened to 4.4 metres (14 ft 5 in) to allow increased structural strength and accommodate the side hatch.

Reusing the pressurised logistics module design from previous HTV reduces development cost and risk. Concentrating RCS thrusters and solar arrays on the service module simplifies wiring and piping, lowering weight and manufacturing cost. External loading of unpressurised cargo enables larger payloads, limited only by the fairing. The goal is to halve costs while maintaining or extending HTV capabilities. Simplification was expected to reduce launch mass to 15,500 kilograms (34,200 lb) from HTV's 16,500 kilograms (36,400 lb), while increasing maximum cargo mass to 5,850 kilograms (12,900 lb) from 4,000 kilograms (8,800 lb).

Other proposed payloads for replacing the unpressurised cargo module during ISS resupply missions include external sensor packages, an IDSS connector for automated docking, satellite rendezvous trials, piggyback small satellites, station return capsules, assembly of lunar mission modules, and acting as a space tug to store resources such as recyclable materials, excess propellant, and spare parts in orbit for future use.

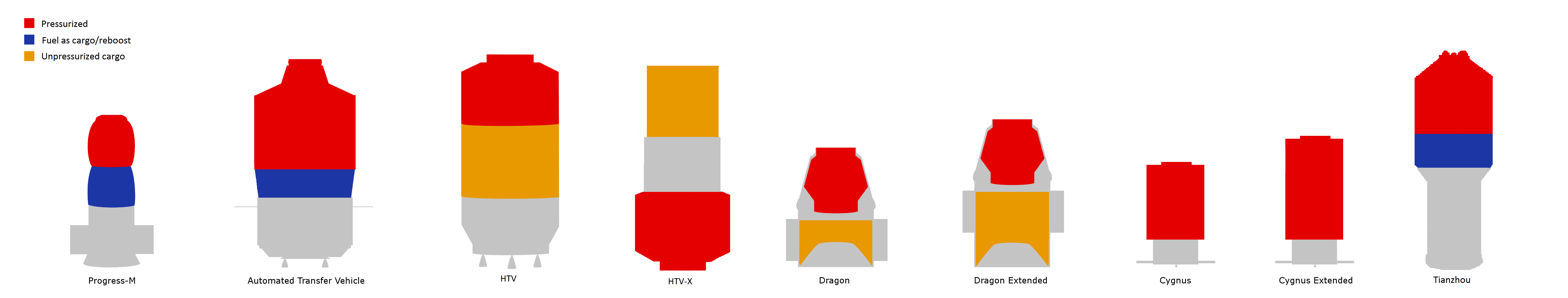
Comparison of uncrewed resupply spacecraft, the original HTV is third from the left, HTV-X is fourth from left

== History ==
In May 2015, Japan's Ministry of Education, Culture, Sports, Science and Technology announced a proposal to replace the HTV with a redesigned, lower-cost successor preliminarily designated HTV-X. The 2015 proposal included the following design choices:

- Reuse of the design of the HTV's Pressurised Logistics Carrier (PLC) as much as possible
- Replacement of the Avionics Module and Propulsion Module with a unified Service Module
- Placement of unpressurised cargo on top of the Service Module rather than within an Unpressurised Logistics Carrier (ULC)

In December 2015, development of HTV-X was approved by the Strategic Headquarters for Space Policy of the Cabinet Office, with the first flight of HTV-X1 (Technical Demonstration Vehicle) targeted for fiscal year 2021 aboard an H3 launch vehicle. As of June 2019, NASA's Flight Planning Integration Panel scheduled the launch of HTV-X1 for February 2022.

Under the Japan-US Open Platform Partnership Program (JP-US OP3) agreement signed in December 2015, which extended cooperation on ISS operations through 2024, Japan agreed to provide part of its contribution to ISS operating costs through HTV-X transportation services and the possible use of a small return capsule.

An early concept included a side hatch on the Pressurised Module to permit late cargo loading, but the final design adopted in 2021 omitted this feature. Late cargo loading remained possible through a Payload Adapter Fitting (PAF) with an opening in the H3 upper stage.

Due to delays in the development of the H3, the first HTV-X launch was delayed until 2025. HTV-X1 was successfully launched on 26 October 2025.

== Flights ==
As of May 2026, three flights are planned to resupply the ISS. All times are in UTC. Future events are listed as "no earlier than" (NET) the stated date. Some dates are given in Japanese fiscal year (JFY), which runs from 1 April to 31 March of the numerated year.

Mission	Launch	Docking	Undocking	Reentry	Outcome
HTV-X1	26 October 2025, 00:00:15	30 October 2025, 11:10	6 March 2026, 17:00	26 May 2026, 14:09	Success
HTV-X2	Summer 2026				Planned
HTV-X3	JFY2027				Planned

As of July 2026, HTV-X4, HTV-X5, and HTV-X6 are tentatively planned for launch in JFY2028–2030.

== See also ==
- Cargo spacecraft
- Comparison of space station cargo vehicles
