= HTV-X3 =

- Mission type: ISS resupply
- Operator: JAXA

Spacecraft properties
- Spacecraft: HTV-X

Berthing at ISS
- Berthing port: Harmony nadir

HTV-X3 is the third flight of HTV-X, an uncrewed expendable cargo spacecraft to resupply International Space Station. It is planned to be launched in JFY2026.

== Payload ==
In its unpressurised cargo section, HTV-X3 will carry Multi-layer Acoustic & Conductive-grid Sensor (MACS), a technology demonstration of millimeter-sized orbital debris detection, co-developed by NASA and JAXA.
