= ALOS-2 =

Japanese earth observation satellite

Advanced Land Observing Satellite-2
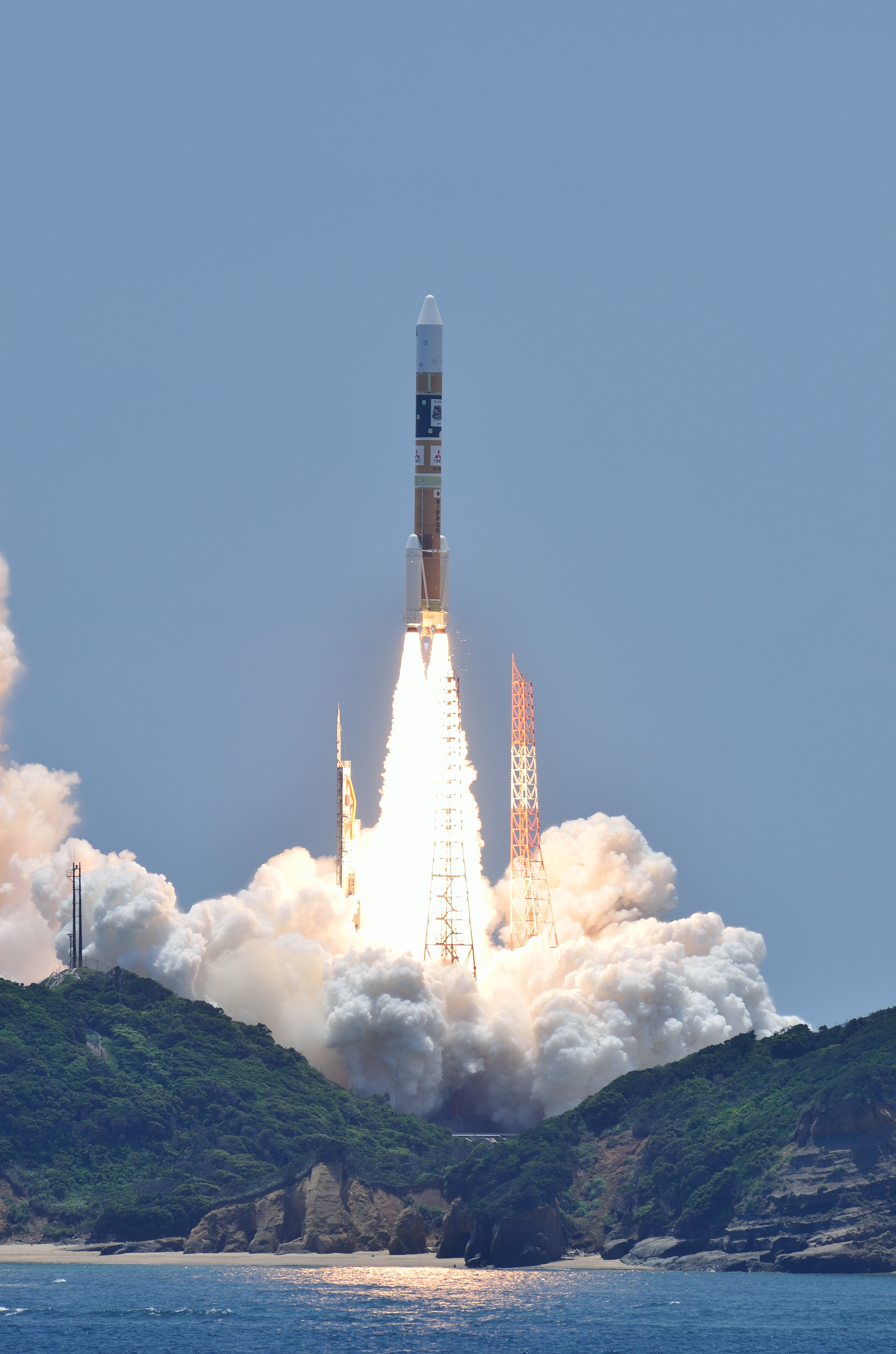
- H-IIA Launch Vehicle Flight 24, launching the Advanced Land Observing Satellite-2 "Daichi-2".
- Names: Daichi-2
- Mission type: Remote sensing
- Operator: JAXA
- COSPAR ID: 2014-029A
- SATCAT no.: 39766
- Website: www.jaxa.jp/projects/sat/alos2/index_j.html
- Mission duration: 12 years, 1 month, 20 days (elapsed)

Spacecraft properties
- Spacecraft type: Advanced Land Observing Satellite
- Bus: ALOS
- Launch mass: 2,120 kg (4,670 lb)

Start of mission
- Launch date: 24 May 2014, 03:05:14 UTC
- Rocket: H-IIA 202
- Launch site: Tanegashima, Yoshinobu 1
- Contractor: Mitsubishi Heavy Industries

Orbital parameters
- Reference system: Geocentric orbit
- Regime: Sun-synchronous orbit
- Perigee altitude: 636 km (395 mi)
- Apogee altitude: 639 km (397 mi)
- Inclination: 97.92°
- Period: 97.33 minutes
- Advanced Land Observation Satellite

Advanced Land Observing Satellite-2 (ALOS-2), also called Daichi-2, is a 2,120 kg (4,670 lb) Japanese satellite launched in 2014. Although the predecessor ALOS satellite had featured 2 optical cameras in addition to L-band (1.2 GHz/25 cm) radar, ALOS-2 had optical cameras removed to simplify construction and reduce costs. The PALSAR-2 radar is a significant upgrade of the PALSAR radar, allowing higher-resolution (1 x 3 m per pixel) spotlight modes in addition to the 10 m resolution survey mode inherited from the ALOS spacecraft. Also, the SPAISE2 automatic ship identification system and the Compact Infra Red Camera (CIRC) will provide supplementary data about sea-going ships and provide early warnings of missile launches.

== Launch ==
ALOS-2 was launched from Tanegashima, Japan, on 24 May 2014 by a H-IIA rocket.

== Mission ==
The satellite contains a 1.2 GHz synthetic-aperture radar (SAR) sensor that is intended to be used for cartography, monitoring of naval traffic and disaster monitoring of Asia and the Pacific. JAXA initially hoped to be able to launch the successor to ALOS during 2011, but these plans were delayed until 2014 because of budget restrictions.

== See also ==
- 2014 in spaceflight
- Advanced Land Observation Satellite (ALOS) – predecessor spacecraft
