= ETS-IX =

Engineering Test Satellite No. 9 (ETS-IX) is a Japanese experimental satellite under development, part of the ETS series.

== Mission objectives ==
- Demonstrate a high-power, all-electric satellite bus design to support large communication payloads.
- Enable flexible communications operations by means of a digital payload (digital channeliser and digital beam-former) and multi-beam Ka-band + free-space optical communications.
- Achieve autonomous orbital maneuver and station-keeping via an onboard geostationary GPS receiver, reducing ground-segment operational cost.
- Support a high-throughput satellite infrastructure—flexible bandwidth and coverage adapting to changing market demands.

== Technical features ==
- Bus mass: ~4.9 t.
- Power generation: over 25 kW anticipated.
- Propulsion: all-electric system (high-thrust Hall thrusters) for orbit transfer and station-keeping.
- Payload: digital beam-forming and optical communication subsystem (HICALI) capable of ~10 Gbit/s laser links.

== History ==
The ETS program dates back to 1975 with ETS-I; the ETS-IX (ETS-9) represents the ninth iteration of this technology-test satellite series. Although originally targeted for launch around 2021, the schedule has shifted and the current planned launch is after fiscal year 2025.

== Significance ==
By offering a platform capable of high throughput, digital payload flexibility and optical communications, ETS-IX aims to help Japan maintain competitiveness in the global commercial satellite communications arena and to reduce life-cycle costs of GEO communications satellites.
