= JERS-1 =

- Names: Japanese Earth Resources Satellite; Fuyo-1
- Mission type: Visible-light astronomy
- Operator: NASDA (now JAXA)
- COSPAR ID: 1992-007A
- SATCAT no.: 21867
- Mission duration: 2 years (planned); 6.6 years (achieved)

Spacecraft properties
- Manufacturer: Mitsubishi Electric
- Launch mass: 1400 kg
- Dimensions: 0.9 m x 1.8 m x 3.2 m with solar spanning 3.5 m x 7.0 m
- Power: 2000 watts

Start of mission
- Launch date: 11 February 1992
- Rocket: H-I
- Launch site: Tanegashima Space Center; Osaki Launch Complex

End of mission
- Disposal: Deorbited
- Declared: 12 October 1998
- Destroyed: 3 December 2001

Orbital parameters
- Reference system: Sun-synchronous orbit
- Altitude: 568 km
- Inclination: 97.7°
- Period: 96 minutes
- Repeat interval: 44 days

Japanese Earth Resources Satellite 1 (JERS-1) was a satellite launched in 1992 by the National Space Development Agency of Japan (NASDA, now part of JAXA). It carried three instruments: An L-band (HH polarization) synthetic aperture radar (SAR); a nadir-pointing optical camera (OPS) and a side-looking optical camera (AVNIR).

== History ==
The satellite had a designated lifespan of only two years, however the mission was extended and it operated until 1998. Jers-1 re-entered the Earth's atmosphere in 2001. The satellite was used to map the largest of Earth's forests and observe coastal regions.

With a 44-day repeat cycle, JERS-1 collected imagery worldwide between 1992 and 1998. Its Global Forest Mapping Program imaged the world's major forests in Southeast Asia, Africa, Central America, South America (the Amazon Basin) and boreal North America. The data were assembled into mosaics, including Amazon low-flood and high-flood mosaics and seasonal mosaics of North America, which are available as open-access products through the Alaska Satellite Facility, and the SAR data are distributed by JAXA in CEOS format.

== Instruments ==
JERS-1 carried an L-band synthetic aperture radar (SAR) operating at 1.275 GHz (a wavelength of 23.5 cm) with HH polarization, together with an optical sensor (OPS). The SAR antenna consisted of eight 2.2 m × 1.5 m panels measuring 2.2 m × 11.9 m in total. It transmitted 1,500 pulses per second at a mean off-nadir angle of 35° to the right of the satellite's track, and it imaged a swath 75 km wide with a resolution of 18 m. The OPS was a high-resolution radiometer made up of two independent radiometers that measured reflected sunlight in eight bands, producing color imagery with a swath width of 75 km and a resolution of 18.3 m (cross-track) by 24.2 m (along-track).
