= Advanced Land Observing Satellite =

Japanese earth observation satellite (2006–2011)

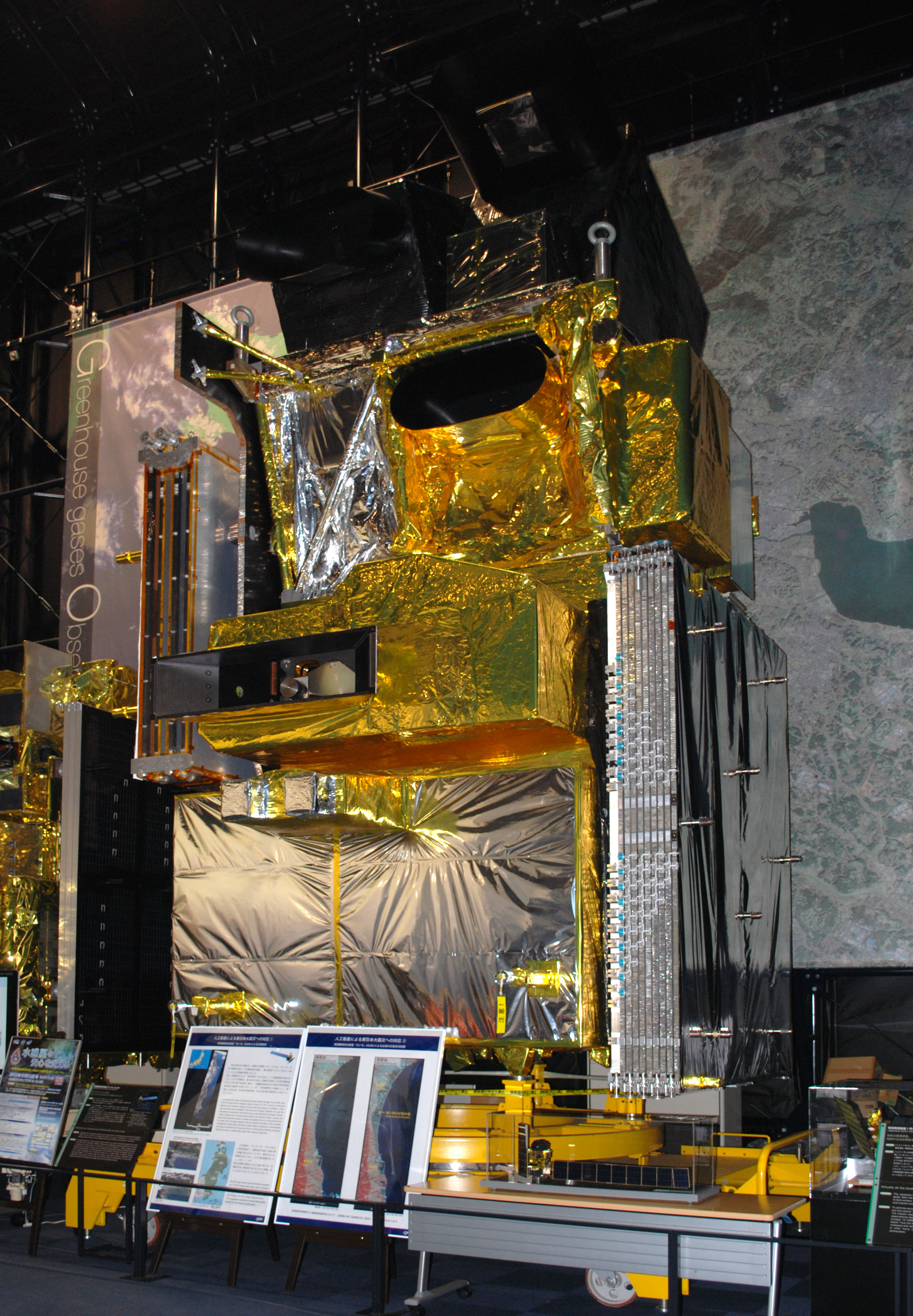
- ALOS model
- Names: Daichi; ALOS
- Mission type: Earth observation
- Operator: Japan Aerospace Exploration Agency (JAXA)
- COSPAR ID: 2006-002A
- SATCAT no.: 28931
- Website: https://global.jaxa.jp/projects/sat/alos/index.html
- Mission duration: 5 years (planned); 5 years, 3 months, 18 days (achieved)

Spacecraft properties
- Spacecraft: ALOS
- Manufacturer: NEC; Toshiba; Mitsubishi Electric
- Launch mass: 3,810 kg (8,400 lb)
- Dimensions: 8.9 m × 27.4 m × 6.2 m (29 ft × 90 ft × 20 ft)
- Power: 7 kW

Start of mission
- Launch date: 24 January 2006, 01:33 UTC
- Rocket: H-IIA-2022 (No. 8)
- Launch site: Tanegashima Space Center
- Contractor: Mitsubishi

End of mission
- Disposal: Decommissioned
- Deactivated: 12 May 2011, 10:50 UTC

Orbital parameters
- Reference system: Geocentric orbit
- Regime: Sun-synchronous orbit
- Perigee altitude: 694 km (431 mi)
- Apogee altitude: 696 km (432 mi)
- Inclination: 98.0°
- Period: 98.5 minutes

Instruments
- PRISM: Panchromatic Remote-sensing Instruments for Stereo Mapping, to measure precise land elevation AVNIR-2: Advanced Visible and Near Infrared Radiometer type 2, which observes what covers land surfaces. 10-meter resolution at nadir PALSAR: Phased Array type L-band Synthetic Aperture Radar, which enables day-and-night and all-weather land observation

Advanced Land Observing Satellite (ALOS), also called Daichi (a Japanese word meaning "land"), was a 3810 kg Japanese satellite launched in 2006. After five years of service, the satellite lost power and ceased communication with Earth, but remains in orbit.

== Launch ==
ALOS was launched from Tanegashima, Japan, on 24 January 2006 by H-IIA No. 8. The launch had been delayed three times by weather and sensor problems.

== Mission ==
The satellite contained three sensors that were used for cartography and disaster monitoring of Asia and the Pacific Ocean. The Japan Aerospace Exploration Agency (JAXA) initially hoped to be able to launch the successor to ALOS during 2011, but this plan did not materialize.

In 2008, it was announced that the images generated by ALOS were too blurry to be of any use for map making. Only 52 of 4,300 images of Japan could be updated based on data from ALOS. Then, JAXA announced the problem was solved.

ALOS was used to analyze several disaster sites. Images of the devastated Japanese coast following the 2011 Tōhoku earthquake and tsunami were among the last major contributions from ALOS.

== Decommissioning ==
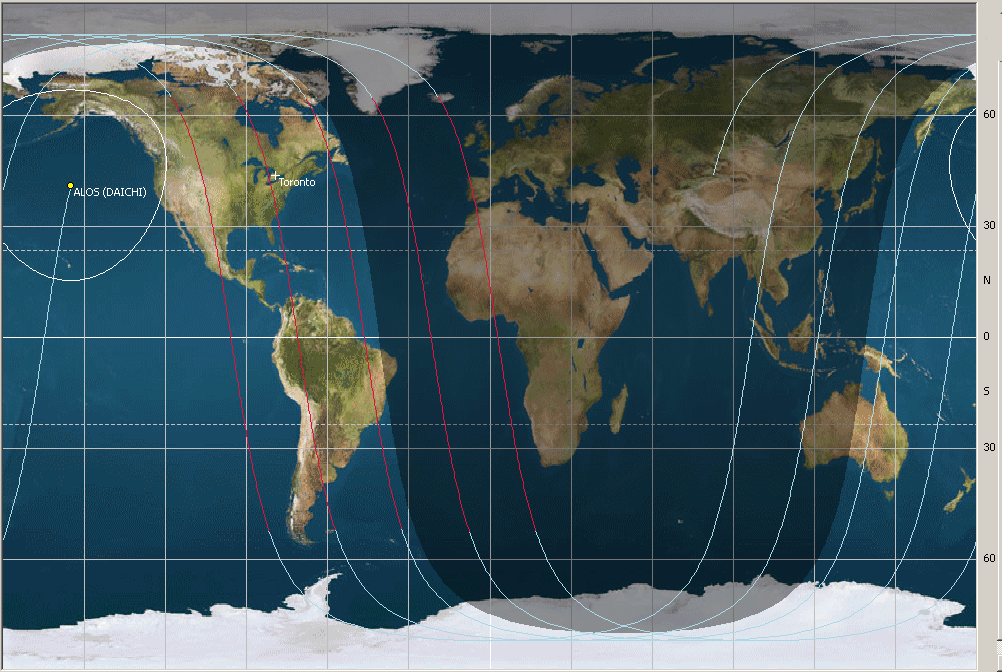
Satellite orbital paths, as of October 2013.

In April 2011, the satellite was found to have switched itself into power-saving mode due to deterioration of its solar arrays. Technicians could no longer confirm that any power was being generated. It was suggested that meteoroids may have struck ALOS, creating the anomaly which eventually led to its shutdown.

On 12 May 2011, JAXA sent a command to the satellite to power down its batteries and declared it dead in orbit.

== See also ==
- 2006 in spaceflight
- ADEOS I, JERS-1 (predecessor spacecraft)
- ALOS-2
