= 2018 in science =

A number of significant scientific events occurred in 2018.

== Events ==
=== January ===
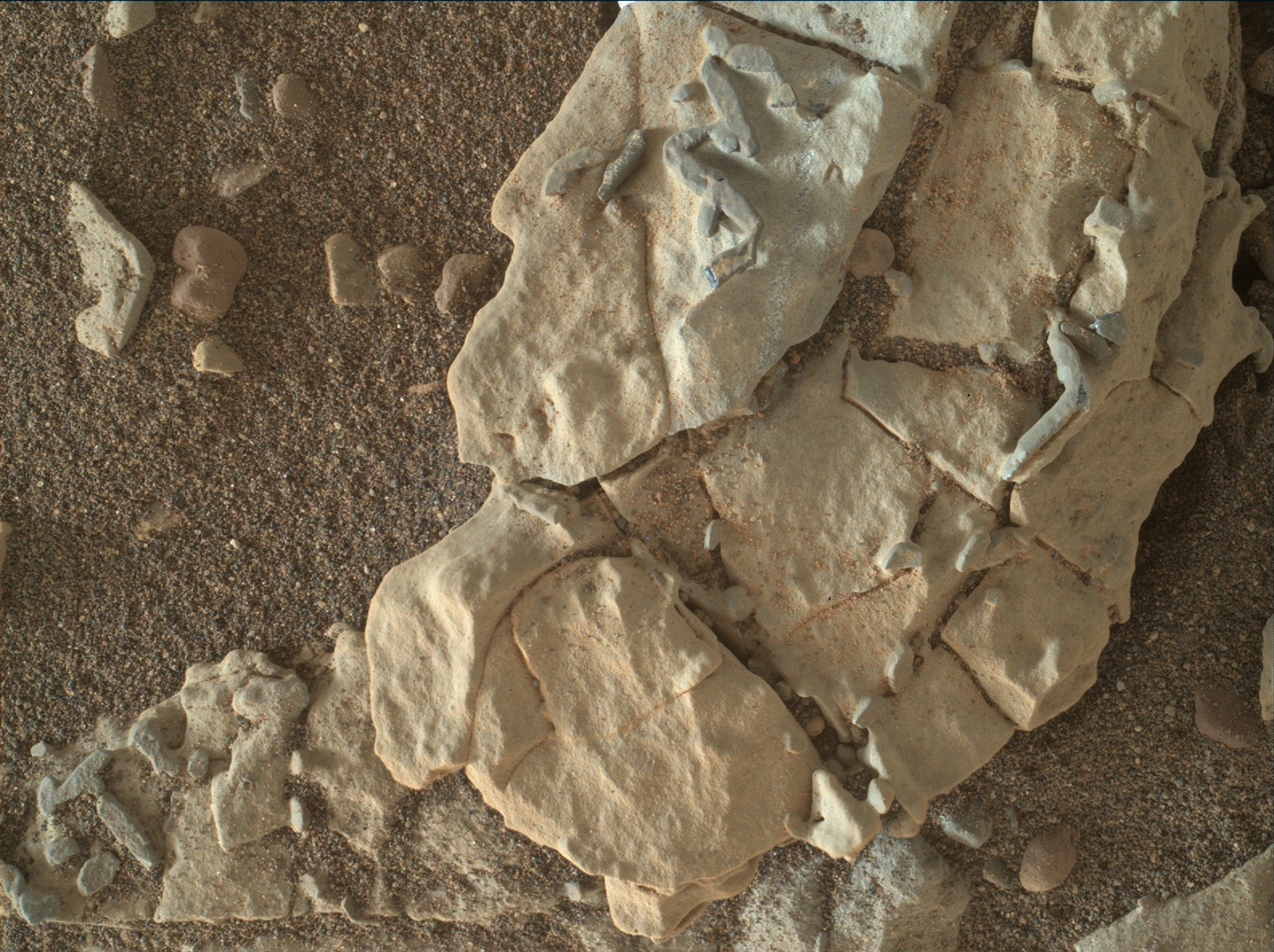
5 January: Curious rock shapes (biological or geological?) found on Mars by the Curiosity rover.

- 1 January – Researchers at Harvard, writing in Nature Nanotechnology, report the first single lens that can focus all colours of the rainbow in the same spot and in high resolution, previously only achievable with multiple lenses.
- 2 January – Physicists at Cornell University report the creation of "muscle" for shape-changing, cell-sized robots.
- 3 January
  - Computer researchers report discovering two major security vulnerabilities, named "Meltdown" and "Spectre," in the microprocessors inside almost all computers in the world.
  - Scientists in Rome unveil the first bionic hand with a sense of touch that can be worn outside a laboratory.
- 4 January – MIT researchers devise a new method to create stronger and more resilient nanofibers.
- 5 January – Researchers report images (including image-1) taken by the Curiosity rover on Mars showing curious rock shapes that may require further study in order to help better determine whether the shapes are biological or geological. Later, an astrobiologist made a similar claim based on a different image (image-2) taken by the Curiosity rover.
- 8 January – The National Oceanic and Atmospheric Administration (NOAA) reports that 2017 was the costliest year on record for climate and weather-related disasters in the United States.
- 9 January
  - A pattern in exoplanets is discovered by a team of multinational researchers led by the Université de Montréal: Planets orbiting the same star tend to have similar sizes and regular spacings. This could imply that most planetary systems form differently from the Solar System.
  - Analysis of the stone Hypatia shows it has a different origin than the planets and known asteroids. Parts of it could be older than the solar system.
  - A new study by researchers at Stanford University indicates the genetic engineering method known as CRISPR may trigger an immune response in humans, thus rendering it potentially ineffective in them.

9 January: A potentially major setback for CRISPR is reported, as it is shown to trigger an immune response in many humans.

- 10 January – Researchers at Imperial College London and King's College London publish a paper in the journal Scientific Reports about the development of a new 3D bioprinting technique, which allows the more accurate printing of soft tissue organs, such as lungs.
- 11 January
  - In a study published in the journal Cell, University of Pennsylvania researchers show a method through which the human innate immune system may possibly be trained to more efficiently respond to diseases and infections.
  - A NASA experiment, Station Explorer for X-ray Timing and Navigation Technology (SEXTANT), shows how spacecraft may possibly determine their location by focusing on millisecond pulsars in space.
- 15 January
  - Artificial intelligence programs developed by Microsoft and Alibaba achieve better average performance on a Stanford University reading and comprehension test than human beings.
  - University of Washington scientists publish a report in the journal Nature Chemistry of the development of a new form of biomaterial based delivery system for therapeutic drugs, which only release their cargo under certain physiological conditions, thereby potentially reducing drug side-effects in patients.
  - University of Pennsylvania announces in the United States National Library of Medicine human clinical trials, that will encompass the use of CRISPR technology to modify the T cells of patients with multiple myeloma, sarcoma and melanoma cancers, to allow the cells to more effectively combat the cancers, the first of their kind trials in the US.
- 17 January – Engineers at the University of Texas at Austin, in collaboration with Peking University scientists, announce the creation of a memory storage device only one atomic layer thick; a so-called 'atomristor'.

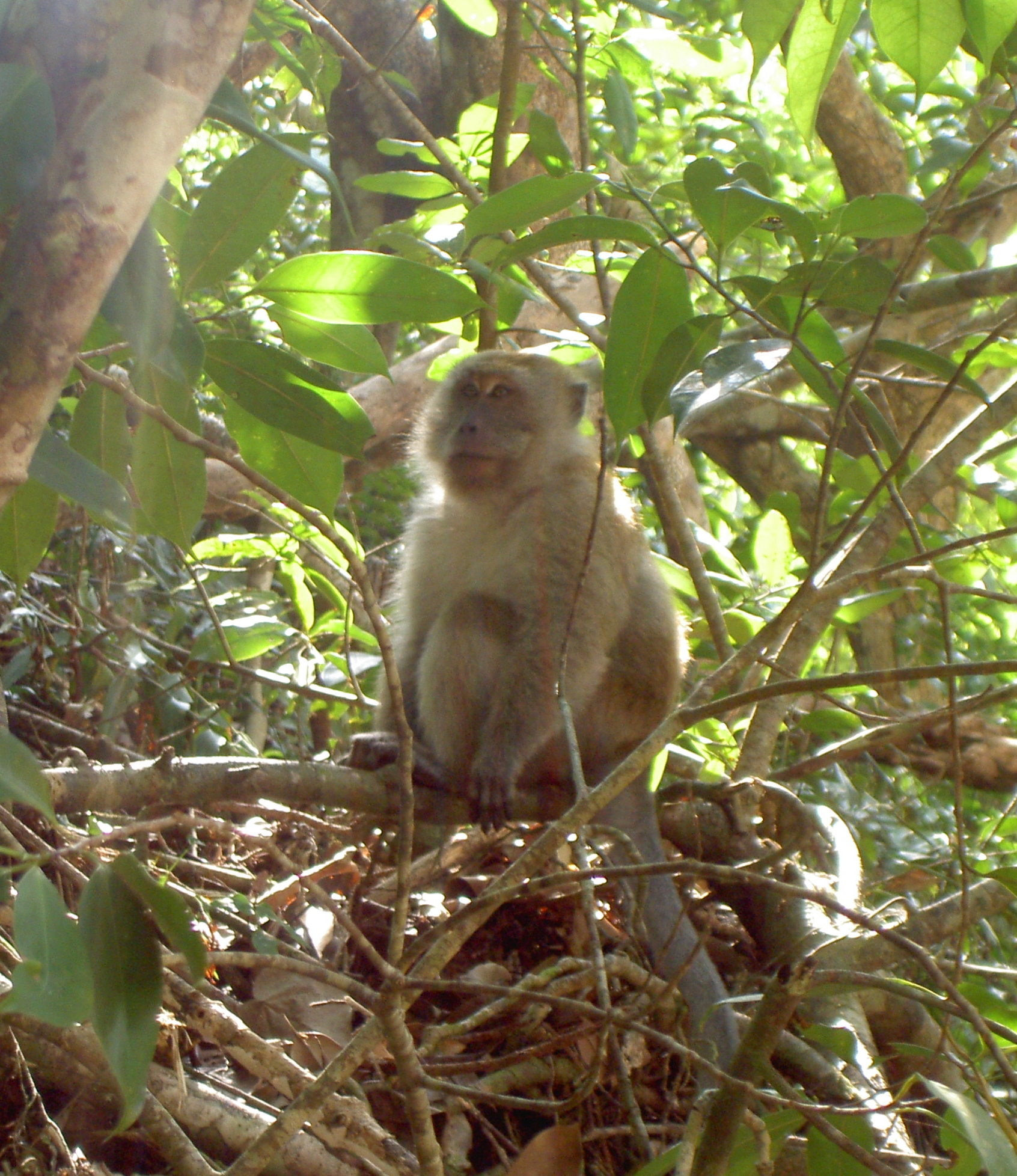
24 January: Creation, using nuclear DNA transfer, for the first time, of clones of a primate (specifically, crab-eating macaque monkeys similar to the one in the picture) reported.

- 18 January
  - NASA and NOAA report that 2017 was the hottest year on record globally without an El Niño, and among the top three hottest years overall.
  - Researchers report developing a blood test (or liquid biopsy) that can detect eight common cancer tumors early. The new test, based on cancer-related DNA and proteins found in the blood, produced 70% positive results in the tumor-types studied in 1005 patients.
  - Sharks are shown to move and feed across the world's oceans in characteristic ways as demonstrated by a global-scale study of stable isotopes in shark tissues led by the University of Southampton and published in the journal Nature Ecology & Evolution.
  - According to a new report published by the US National Science Foundation (NSF), the US is facing increasing competition in scientific endeavours from China, with the latter now publishing more annual scientific papers, but the US still leads in research and development (R&D) and venture capital (VC).
  - Medical researchers at the Gladstone Institutes discover a method of turning skin cells into stem cells, with the use of CRISPR.
- 19 January – Researchers at the Technical University of Munich report a new propulsion method for molecular machines, which enables them to move 100,000 times faster than biochemical processes used to date.
- 22 January
  - Amazon opens the first Amazon Go store, the first completely cashier-less grocery store.
  - Engineers at MIT develop a new computer chip, with "artificial synapses," which process information more like neurons in a brain.
- 24 January – Scientists in China report in the journal Cell the creation of two monkey clones, named Zhong Zhong and Hua Hua, using the complex DNA transfer method that produced Dolly the sheep, for the first time.
- 25 January
  - Researchers report evidence that modern humans migrated from Africa at least as early as 194,000 years ago, somewhat consistent with recent genetic studies, and much earlier than previously thought.
  - Scientists working for Calico, a company owned by Alphabet, publish a paper in the journal eLife which presents possible evidence that Heterocephalus glaber (naked mole-rat) do not face increased mortality risk due to aging.
- 29 January – Scientists report, for the first time, that 800 million viruses, mainly of marine origin, are deposited daily from the Earth's atmosphere onto every square meter of the planet's surface, as the result of a global atmospheric stream of viruses, circulating above the weather system, but below the altitude of usual air travel, distributing viruses around the planet.

=== February ===
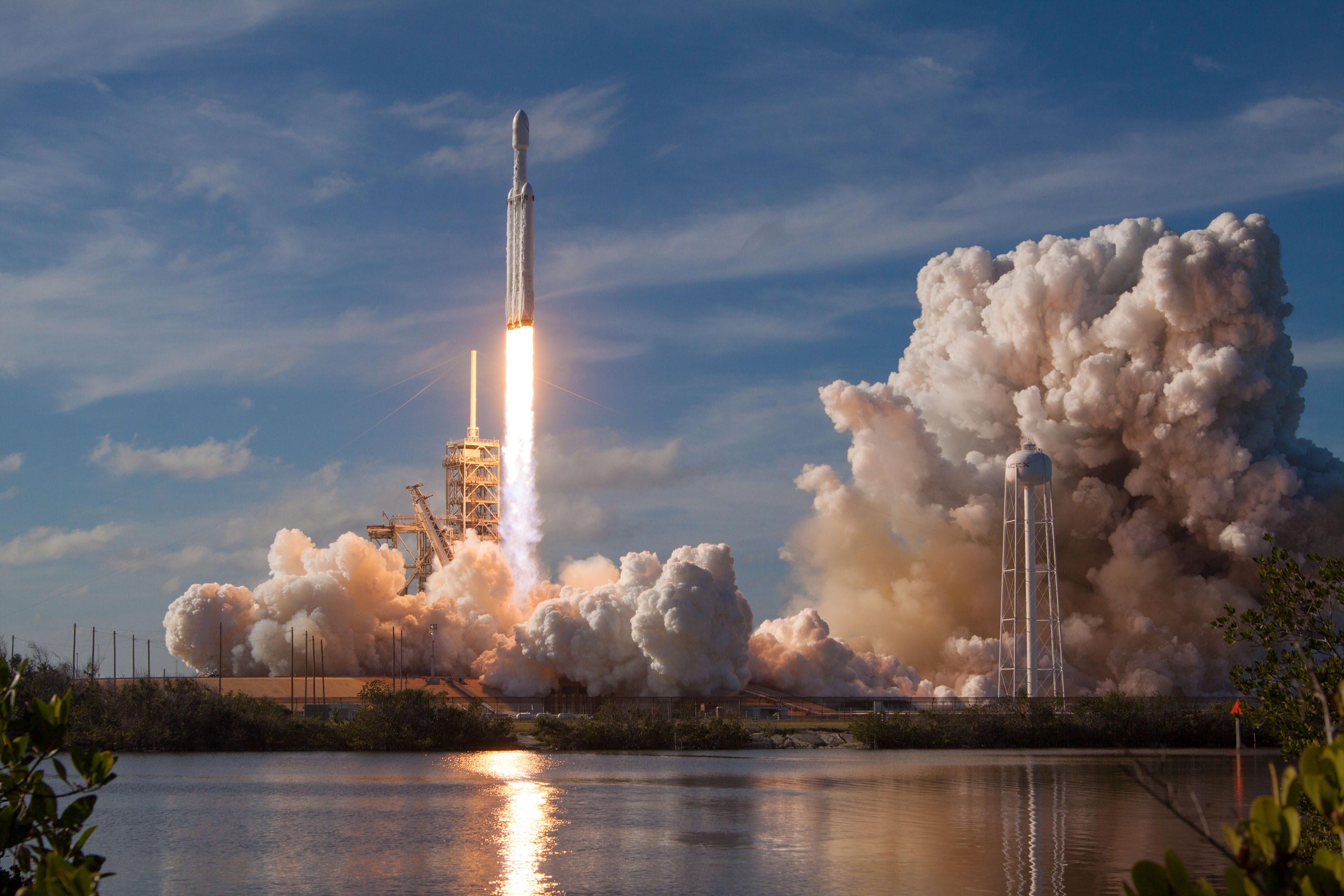
6 February: Successful launch of the Falcon Heavy, the most powerful rocket since the Space Shuttle program.

- 2 February – A study published in the journal Science by researchers from the United States Geological Survey and the University of California, Santa Cruz reports the severe degradation of the health of polar bears in the Arctic, due to the effects of climate change.
- 5 February
  - Researchers find additional evidence for an exotic form of water, called superionic water, which is not found naturally on Earth, but could be common on the planets Uranus and Neptune.
  - Astronomers report evidence, for the first time, that extragalactic exoplanets, much more distant than the exoplanets found within the local Milky Way galaxy, may exist.
- 6 February
  - SpaceX successfully conducts its maiden flight of its most powerful rocket to date, and the most powerful rocket since the Space Shuttle program, the Falcon Heavy, from LC-39A at Kennedy Space Center.
  - The National Snow and Ice Data Center (NSIDC) reports that global sea ice extent has fallen to a new record low.
- 8 February – Astronomers report the first confirmed findings from the Zwicky Transient Facility (ZTF) project, with the discovery of 2018 CL, a small near-Earth asteroid.
- 9 February – Human eggs are grown in the laboratory for the first time, by researchers at the University of Edinburgh.
- 13 February – Scientists at Rockefeller University, writing in the journal Nature Microbiology, describe how compounds in soil known as malacidins can overcome antibiotic resistance in mice with MRSA.

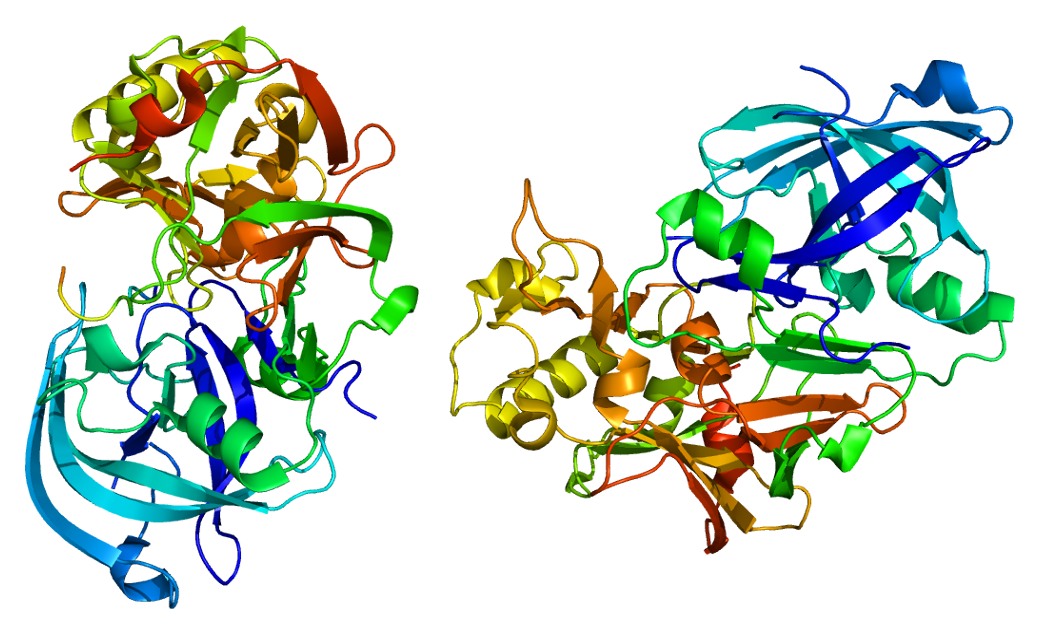
14 February: Researchers found that blocking the enzyme beta-secretase (BACE1) in mice reduces formation of plaques responsible for Alzheimer's disease.

- 14 February
  - By studying the orbits of high-speed stars, researchers in Australia calculate that the Andromeda Galaxy has only one-third as much dark matter as previously thought, making it similar in mass to the Milky Way.
  - A study published by the Journal of Experimental Medicine shows that blocking the enzyme beta-secretase (BACE1) in mice can substantially reduce the formation of plaques responsible for Alzheimer's disease.
- 16 February – Scientists report, for the first time, the discovery of a new form of light, which may involve polaritons, that could be useful in the development of quantum computers.
- 19 February – Scientists identify traces of the genes of the indigenous Taíno people in modern-day Puerto Ricans, indicating that the ethnic group was not extinct as previously believed.
- 21 February – Medical researchers report that e-cigarettes contain chemicals known to cause cancer and brain damage; as well as, contain potentially dangerous (even potentially toxic) levels of metals, including arsenic, chromium, lead, manganese and nickel.
- 28 February – Astronomers report, for the first time, a signal of the reionization epoch, an indirect detection of light from the earliest stars formed – about 180 million years after the Big Bang.

=== March ===
- 5 March
  - Researchers at MIT and Harvard report in the journal Nature of discovering the phenomenon of graphene acting as a superconductor, when its atoms are re-arranged in a specific manner.
  - Google announces the creation of "Bristlecone", the world's most advanced quantum computer chip, featuring 72 qubits.

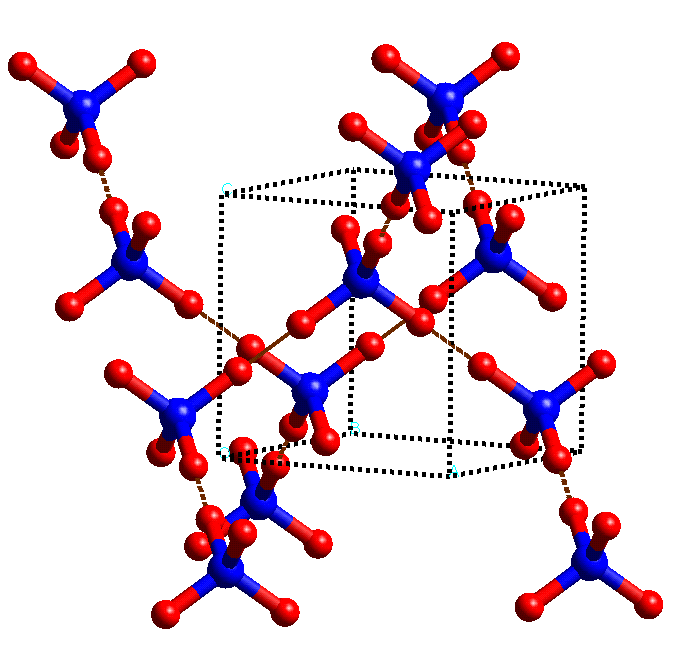
8 March: First detection of natural Ice VII (see structure above) on Earth.

- 8 March – Scientists report the first detection of natural ice VII on Earth, previously it was only produced artificially. It may be common on the moons Enceladus, Europa and Titan.
- 9 March – NASA medical researchers report that human spaceflight may alter gene expression in astronauts, based on twin studies where one astronaut twin, Scott Kelly, spent nearly one year in space while the other, Mark Kelly, remained on Earth.
- 13 March – Scientists report that Archaeopteryx, a prehistoric feathered dinosaur, was likely capable of flight, but in a manner substantially different from that of modern birds.
- 15 March
  - Intel reports that it will redesign its CPUs (performance losses to be determined) to help protect against the Meltdown and Spectre security vulnerabilities (especially, Meltdown and Spectre-V2, but not Spectre-V1), and expects to release the newly redesigned processors later in 2018.
  - Researchers at the Gladstone Institutes report a new cellular therapy in the journal Neuron which shows promise in combating the effects of Alzheimer's disease.
- 19 March – Uber suspends all of its self-driving cars worldwide after a woman is killed by one of the vehicles in Arizona. This is the first recorded fatality using a fully automated version of the technology.
- 22 March – Scientists at Harvard Medical School identify a key mechanism behind vascular aging and muscle decline in mice. Their study shows that treating the animals with a chemical compound called NMN enhances blood vessel growth and reduces cell death, boosting their stamina and endurance.
- 26 March
  - A study in Geophysical Research Letters concludes that West Greenland's ice sheet is melting at its fastest rate in centuries.
  - The world's first total transplant of a penis and scrotum is performed by surgeons at Johns Hopkins University in Baltimore, Maryland, operating on a soldier who was wounded in Afghanistan.

=== April ===
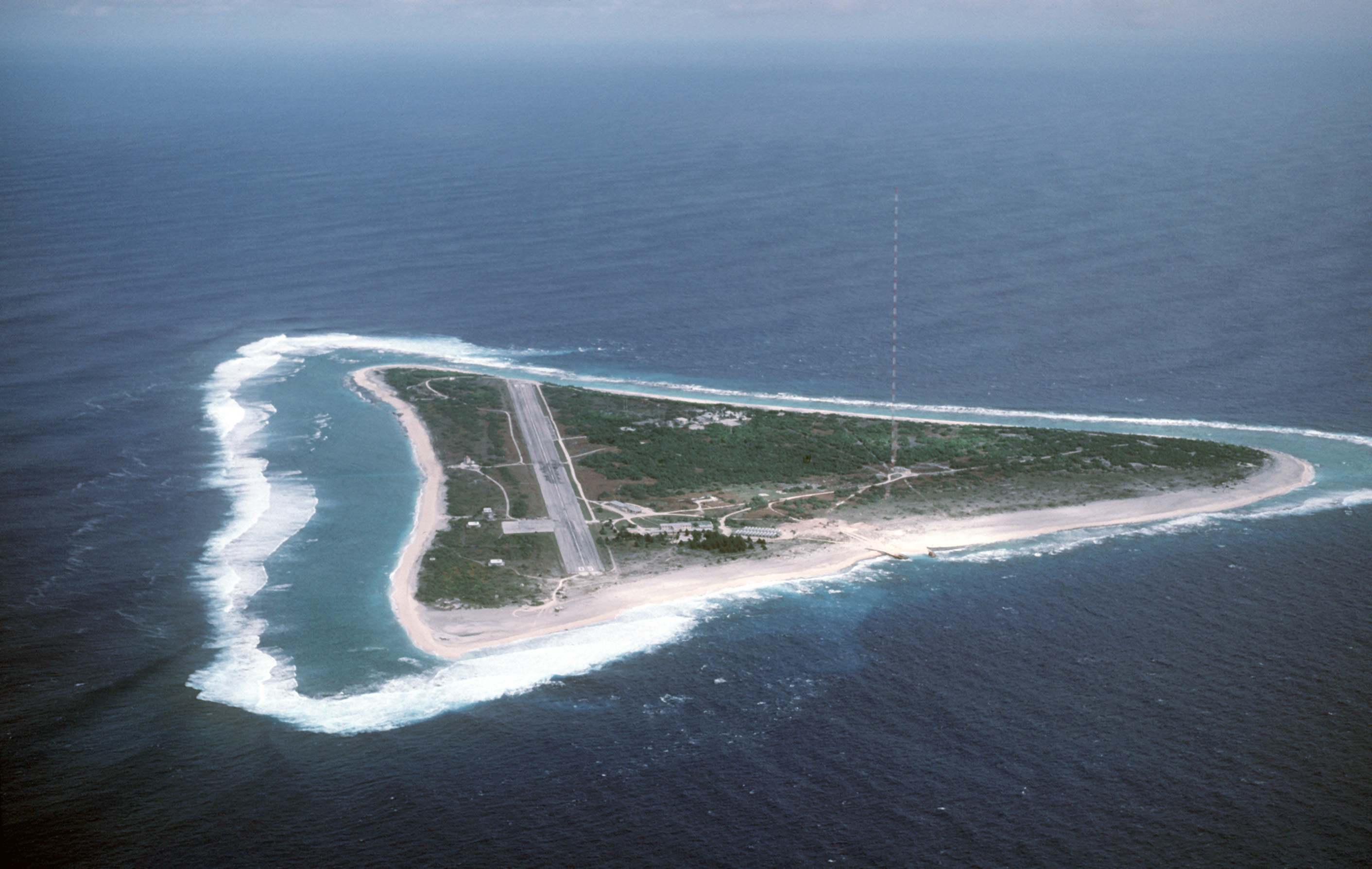
10 April: Centuries' worth of rare-earth metals reported near the island of Minami-Tori-shima (pictured).

- 2 April
  - The inoperative Tiangong-1 space lab comes down over the South Pacific Ocean, northwest of Tahiti.
  - Astronomers report the detection of the most distant individual star (actually, a blue supergiant), named Icarus (formally, MACS J1149 Lensed Star 1), at 9 billion light-years (light-travel distance) away from Earth.
- 5 April – Odilorhabdins, a novel class of naturally-produced antibiotics, is formally described.
- 10 April – Researchers in Japan report finding centuries' worth of rare-earth metals in deep sea mud, located near Minami-Tori-shima in the northwest Pacific.
- 11 April – Two studies, both published in Nature, find that the warm Atlantic Gulf Stream is at its weakest for at least 1,600 years.
- 17 April – Engineers at MIT develop a new more efficient method of producing long strips of graphene.
- 18 April
  - NASA's Transiting Exoplanet Survey Satellite (TESS) is launched.
  - Nanyang Technological University demonstrates a robot that can autonomously assemble an IKEA chair without interruption.

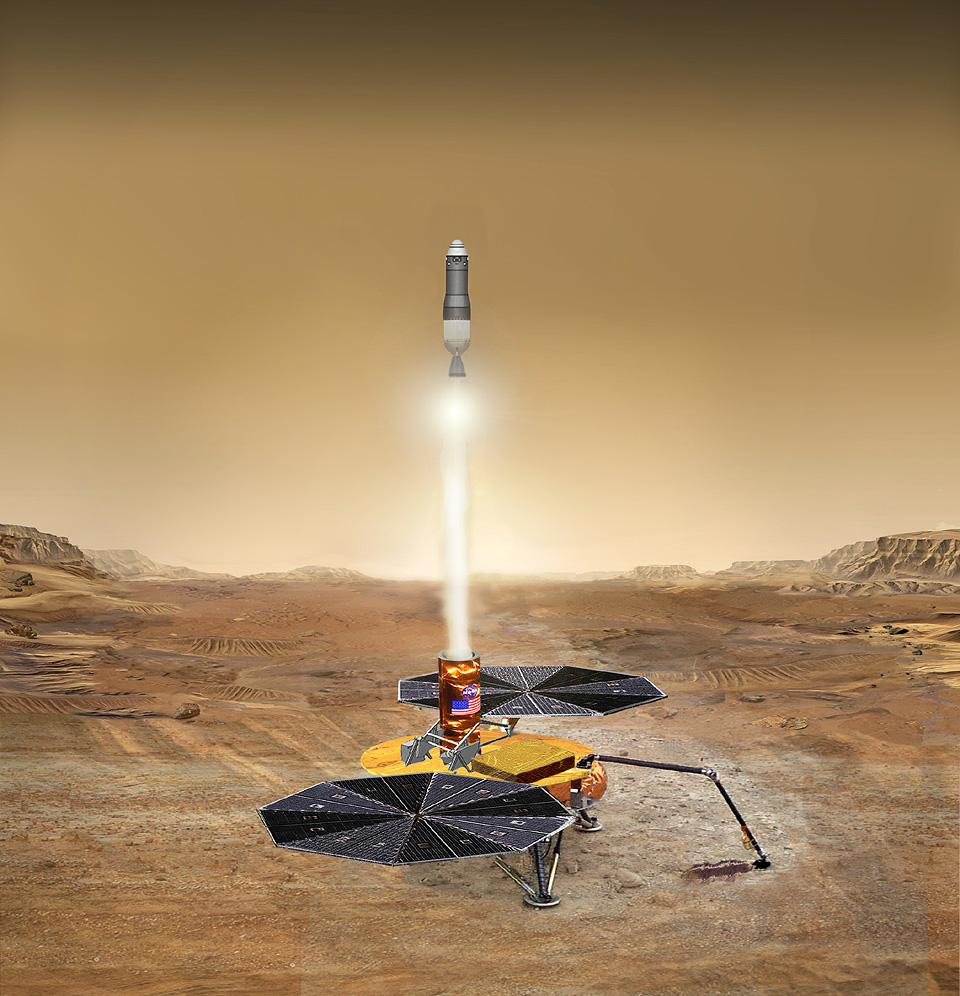
26 April: NASA and ESA agree to develop Mars sample return missions.

- 19 April – The results of a new gene therapy trial of 22 patients with the blood disorder beta thalassemia, published in the New England Journal of Medicine, indicates 15 of the patients being cured entirely while 7 requiring fewer annual blood transfusions.
- 25 April
  - The Gaia collaboration publishes its second data release containing 1.7 billion light sources, with positions, parallaxes and proper motions for about 1.3 billion of them.
  - Scientists publish evidence that asteroids may have been primarily responsible for bringing water to Earth.
- 26 April
  - Scientists report that a letter of intent was signed by NASA and ESA which may provide a basis for sample return missions to other planets, including Mars sample return missions, with the purpose of better studying the possible existence of past or present extraterrestrial primitive life forms, including microorganisms.
  - Scientists identify 44 gene variants linked to increased risk for depression.
  - The Belle II experiment starts taking data to study B mesons.
- 27 April – Stephen Hawking's final paper – A smooth exit from eternal inflation? – is published in the Journal of High Energy Physics.
- 30 April – Researchers report identifying 6,331 groups of genes that are common to all living animals, and which may have arisen from a single common ancestor that lived 650 million years ago in the Precambrian.

=== May ===
- 1 May – The Genome Project-Write announces a new 10 year initiative to attempt to make human cells immune to viral infections.

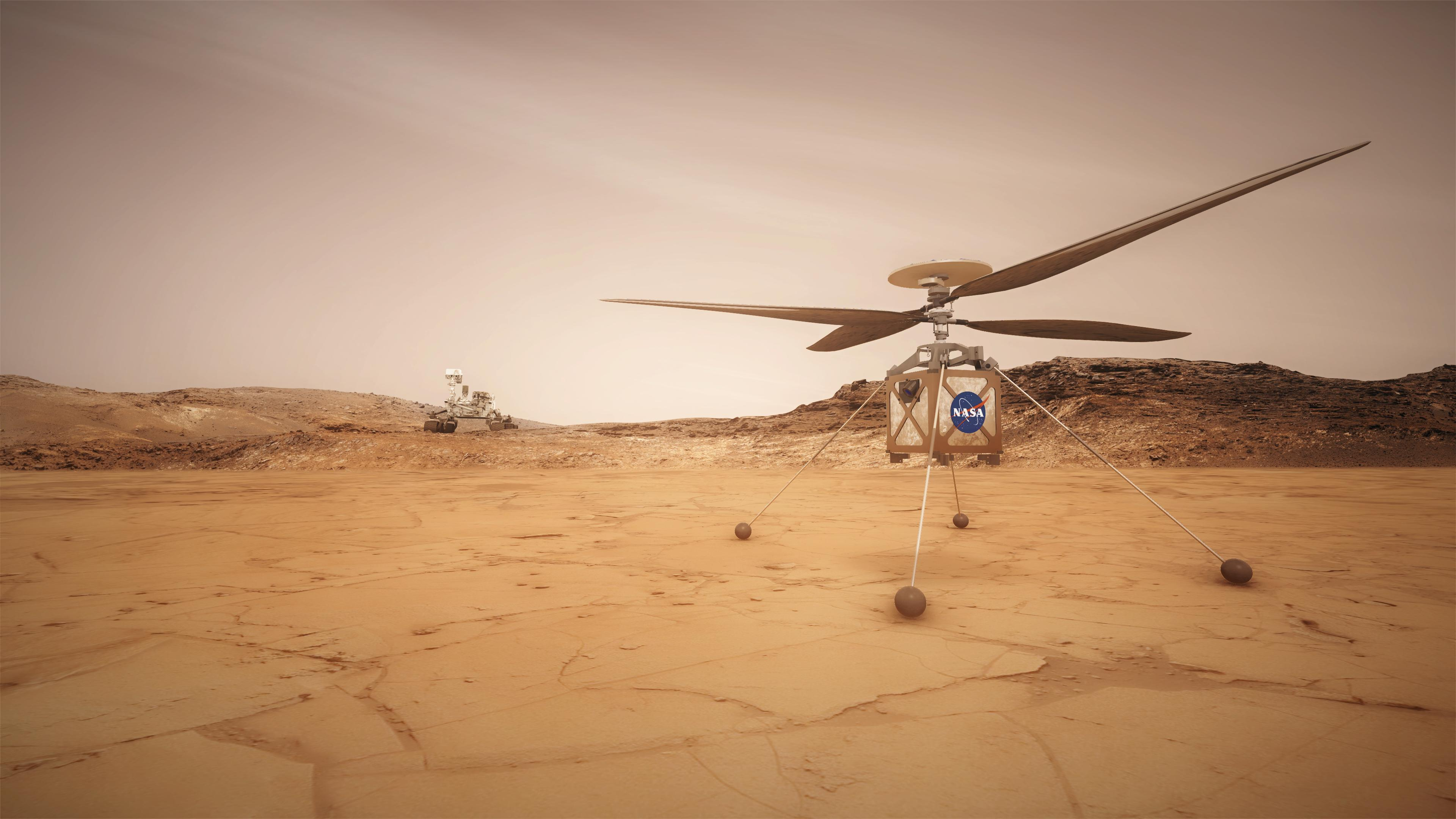
11 May: NASA approves the Mars Helicopter for the Mars 2020 mission.

- 2 May – Scientists discover that Helium is present in the exoplanet WASP-107b.
- 5 May – The InSight spacecraft, designed to study the interior and subsurface of the planet Mars, successfully launches at 11:05 UTC, with an expected arrival on 26 November 2018.
- 9 May – Scientists report that the curious physical phenomenon of quantum entanglement is even more supported based on recent rigorous Bell test experimentations.
- 10 May – NASA's Carbon Monitoring System (CMS) is cancelled by the Trump administration.
- 11 May – NASA approves the Mars Helicopter for the Mars 2020 mission.
- 14 May
  - Astronomers publish supporting evidence of water plume activity on Europa, moon of the planet Jupiter, based on an updated critical analysis of data obtained from the Galileo space probe, which orbited Jupiter between 1995 and 2003. Such plume activity, similar to that found on Saturn's moon Enceladus, could help researchers search for life from the subsurface European ocean without having to land on the moon.
  - Anthropologists provide evidence that the brain of Homo naledi, an extinct hominid which is thought to have lived between 226,000 and 335,000 years ago, was small, but nonetheless complex, sharing structural similarities with the modern human brain.

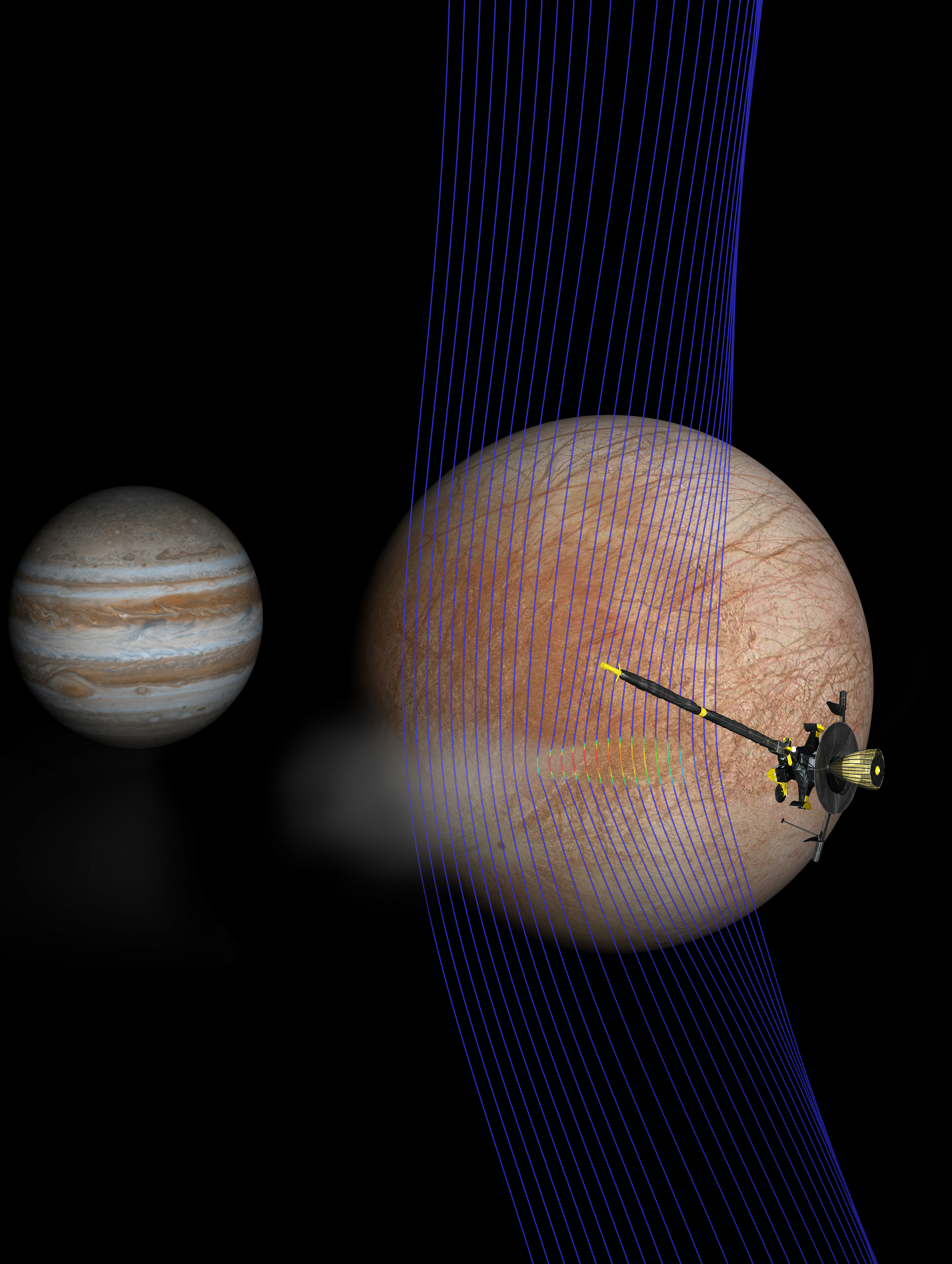
14 May: Water plumes on Europa detected by the Galileo space probe.

- 17 May – Scientists warn that banned CFC-11 gas emissions are originating from an unknown source somewhere in East Asia, with potential to damage the ozone layer.
- 22 May
  - Scientists report another CPU security vulnerability, related to the Spectre and Meltdown vulnerabilities, called Speculative Store Bypass (SSB), and affecting the ARM, AMD and Intel families of CPUs.
  - Scientists from Purdue University and the Chinese Academy of Sciences report the use of CRISPR/Cas9 to develop a variety of rice producing 25-31% more grain than traditional breeding methods.
  - Significant asteroid data arising from the Wide-field Infrared Survey Explorer and NEOWISE missions is questioned.
- 23 May – Paleontologists report finding the skull of a new species of haramiyida (a long lived lineage of mammaliaform cynodonts), called Cifelliodon wahkarmooshuh, underneath the fossilized foot of a large dinosaur that lived 130 million years ago in North America.
- 24 May
  - Based largely on government data, including data from NASA, FEMA and others, The New York Times reports an exhaustive overview of recurrent natural disasters in the United States since 1900.
  - Astronomers claim that the dwarf planet Pluto may have been formed as a result of the agglomeration of numerous comets and related Kuiper belt objects.
  - Researchers at the University of Leeds report that climate change could increase arable land in boreal regions by 44% by the year 2100, while having a negative impact everywhere else.
- 30 May
  - The first 3D printed human corneas are created at Newcastle University.
  - The FDA approves the first artificial iris.
  - Physicists of the MiniBooNE experiment report a stronger neutrino oscillation signal than expected, a possible hint of sterile neutrinos, an elusive particle that may pass through matter without any interaction whatsoever.

=== June ===
1 June: Mars dust storm (before/after) detected that may affect the survivability of the Opportunity rover.

- 1 June – NASA scientists detect signs of a dust storm on the planet Mars which may affect the survivability of the solar-powered Opportunity rover since the dust may block the sunlight (see image) needed to operate; as of 12 June, the storm spanned an area about the size of North America and Russia combined (about a quarter of the planet); as of 13 June, Opportunity was reported to be experiencing serious communication problem(s) due to the dust storm; a NASA teleconference about the dust storm was presented on 13 June 2018 at 01:30 pm/et/usa and is available for replay. On 20 June, NASA reported that the dust storm had grown to completely cover the entire planet.
- 4 June – Direct coupling of the Higgs boson with the top quark is observed for the first time by the ATLAS experiment and the CMS experiment at CERN.
- 5 June – Researchers at Case Western Reserve University School of Medicine synthesise the first artificial human prion.
- 6 June
  - Footprints in the Yangtze Gorges area of South China, dating back 546 million years, are reported to be the earliest known record of an animal with legs.
  - The spacecraft Dawn assumes a final (and much closer) orbit around the dwarf planet Ceres: as close as 35 km (22 mi) and as far away as 4,000 km (2,500 mi) (see images).
- 7 June – NASA announces that the Curiosity rover has detected a cyclical seasonal variation in atmospheric methane (see image) on the planet Mars, as well as the presence of kerogen and other complex organic compounds.
- 8 June – The U.S. Department of Energy's Oak Ridge National Laboratory unveils Summit as the world's most powerful supercomputer, with a peak performance of 200,000 trillion calculations per second, or 200 petaflops.
- 11 June – KATRIN, an experiment designed to measure the absolute mass of neutrinos, starts data-taking.

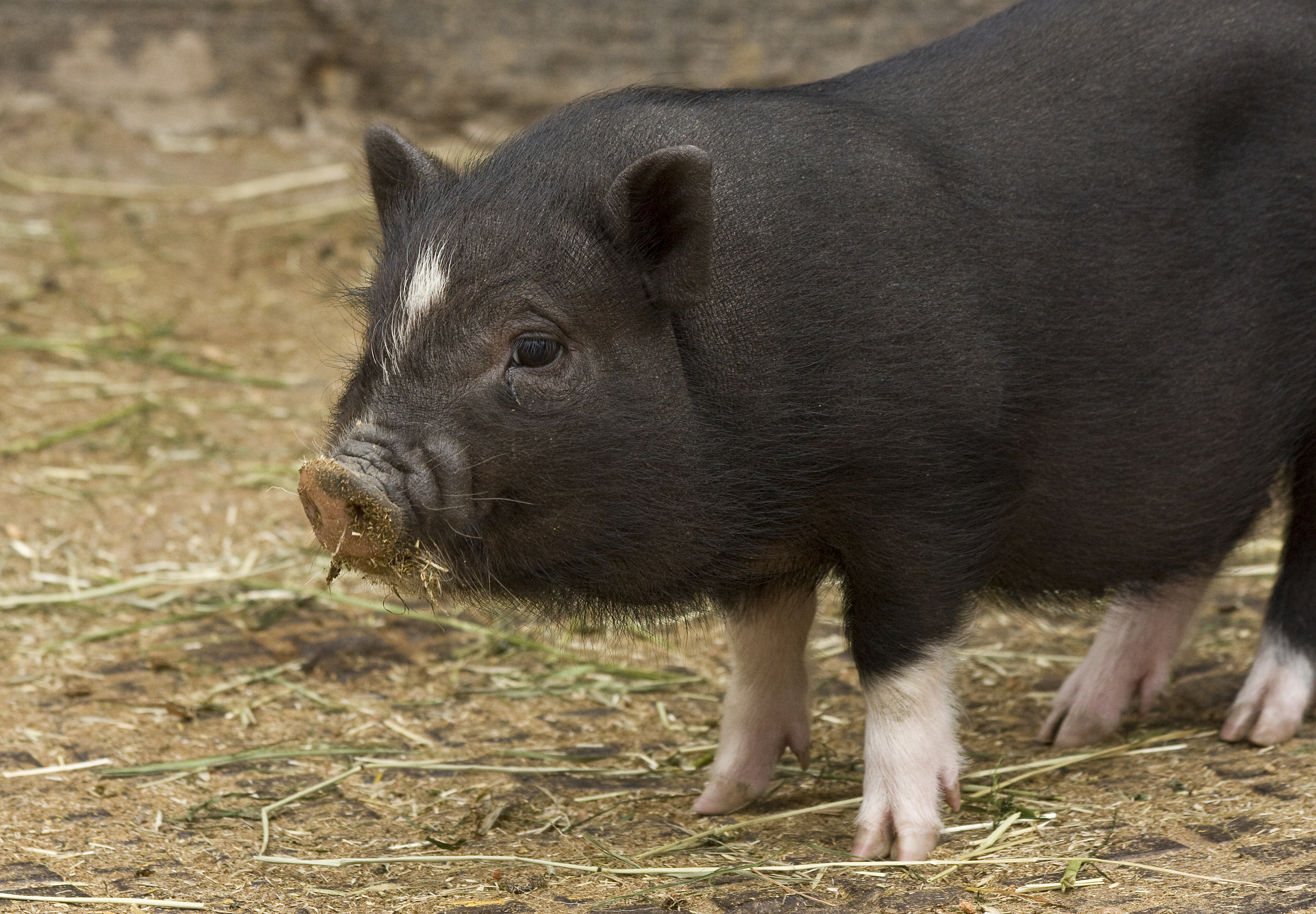
20 June: Gene-edited pigs are made resistant to porcine reproductive and respiratory syndrome, one of the world's most costly animal diseases.

- 14–15 June – The Japanese Hayabusa2 probe returns images of the asteroid 162173 Ryugu from a distance of 650–700 km. It enters orbit on 27 June.
- 16 June – Astronomers detect AT2018cow (ATLAS name: ATLAS18qqn), a powerful astronomical explosion, 10-100 times brighter than a normal supernova, that may be a cataclysmic variable star (CV), gamma-ray burst (GRB), gravitational wave (GW), supernova (SN) or something else. By 22 June 2018, this astronomical event had generated a significant interest among astronomers throughout the world, and may be, as of 22 June 2018, considered a supernova, tentatively named Supernova 2018cow (SN 2018cow). However, the true identity of AT2018cow remains unclear, according to astronomers.
- 18 June – MIT publishes details of "VoxelMorph", a new machine-learning algorithm, which is over 1,000 times faster at registering brain scans and other 3D images.
- 20 June – Scientists at the University of Edinburgh report that gene-edited pigs have been made resistant to porcine reproductive and respiratory syndrome, one of the world's most costly animal diseases.
- 21 June – The US National Science and Technology Council warns that America is unprepared for an asteroid impact event, and has developed and released the "National Near-Earth Object Preparedness Strategy Action Plan" to better prepare.
- 26 June – Researchers at the University of California, Los Angeles, develop synthetic T cells that mimic the form and function of real human versions.
- 27 June
  - Astronomers report that ʻOumuamua, an object from interstellar space passing through the Solar System, is a mildly active comet, and not an asteroid, as previously thought. This was determined by measuring a non-gravitational boost to ʻOumuamua's acceleration, consistent with comet outgassing. (image) (animation)
  - Astronomers report the detection of complex macromolecular organics on Enceladus, moon of the planet Saturn.

=== July ===
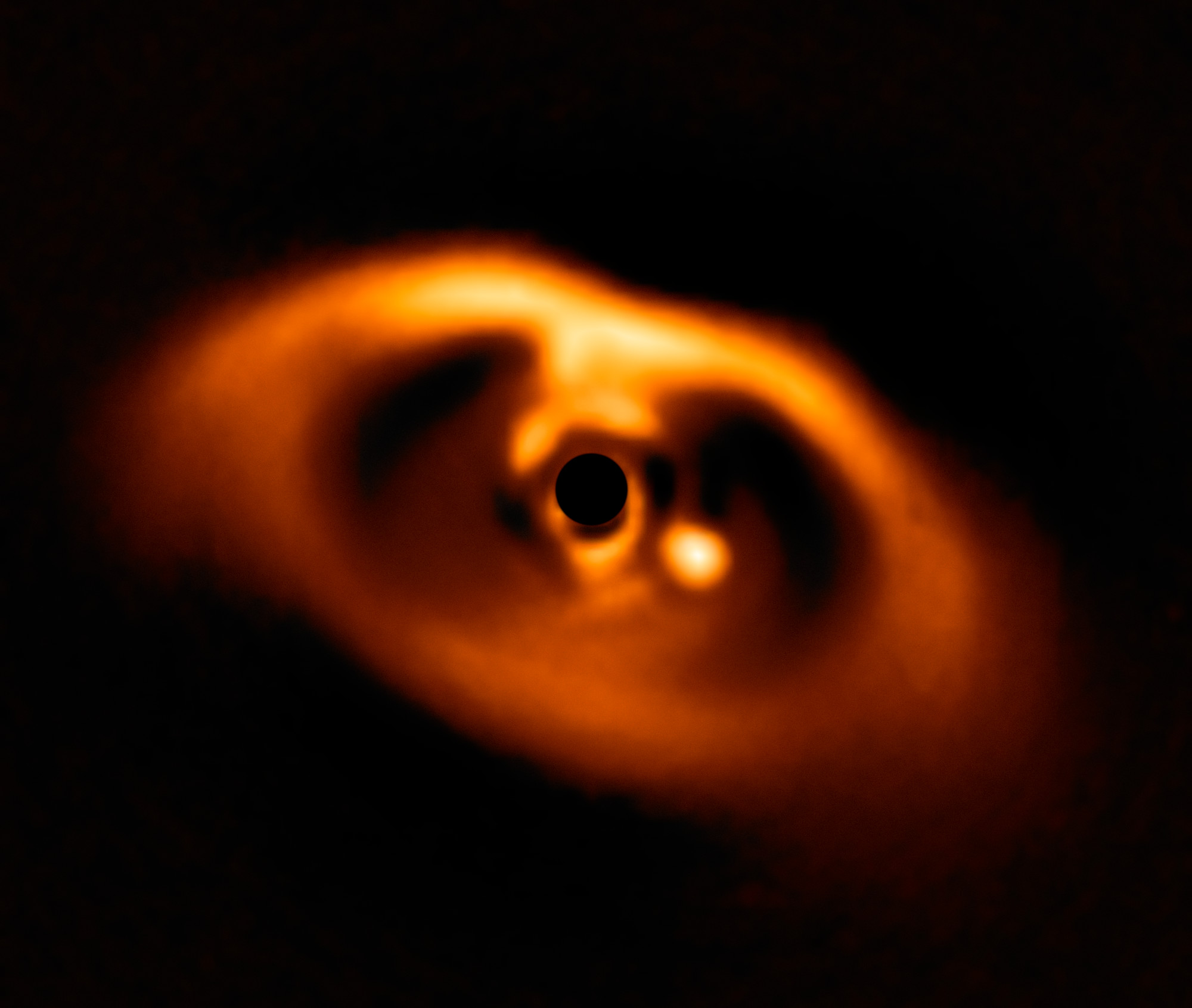
2 July: First confirmed image of a newborn planet, exoplanet PDS 70b, several times larger than the planet Jupiter.

- 2 July
  - Astronomers report taking the first confirmed image (see image) of a newborn planet. The name of the nascent exoplanet is PDS 70b and is a few times larger than the planet Jupiter.
  - The koala genome is completely sequenced.
- 10 July – Researchers at the University of Michigan show that increased atmospheric CO_{2} reduces the medicinal properties of milkweed plants that protect monarch butterflies from disease.
- 11 July – Scientists report the discovery in China of the oldest stone tools outside of Africa, estimated at 2.12 million years old.
- 12 July
  - The IceCube Neutrino Observatory announces that they have traced a neutrino that hit their Antarctica-based research station in September 2017 back to its point of origin in a blazar 3.7 billion light-years away. This is the first time that a neutrino detector has been used to locate an object in space.
  - Using NASA's Hubble and ESA's Gaia, astronomers make the most precise measurements to date of the universe's expansion rate – a figure of 73.5 km (45.6 miles) per second per megaparsec – reducing the uncertainty to just 2.2 percent.
- 16 July – A study by the University of Wisconsin-Madison concludes that thousands of miles of buried Internet infrastructure could be damaged or destroyed by rising sea levels within 15 years.
- 17 July – Scientists led by Scott S. Sheppard report the discovery of 12 new moons of Jupiter, taking its total number to 79. This includes an "oddball", Valetudo (originally known as S/2016 J 2; Roman-numeral designation Jupiter LXII), that is predicted to eventually collide with a neighbouring moon.
- 19 July – A complete fruit fly connectome is mapped at nanoscale resolution for the first time, using two high-speed electron microscopes on 7,000 brain slices and 21 million images.
- 20 July
  - Researchers report that the largest single source of dust on the planet Mars comes from the Medusae Fossae Formation.
  - Scientists at the University of Alabama at Birmingham announce the reversal of aging-associated skin wrinkles and hair loss in a mouse model.
- 23 July
  - A study published in Nature Climate Change finds that the death toll from suicide in the United States and Mexico has risen between 0.7 and 2.1 percent with each degree (Celsius) of increased monthly average temperature. By 2050, this could lead to an additional 21,000 suicides.
  - Scientists at the University of Alberta report a new technique, based on quickly removing or replacing single hydrogen atoms, which can provide a thousand-fold increase in solid-state memory density.

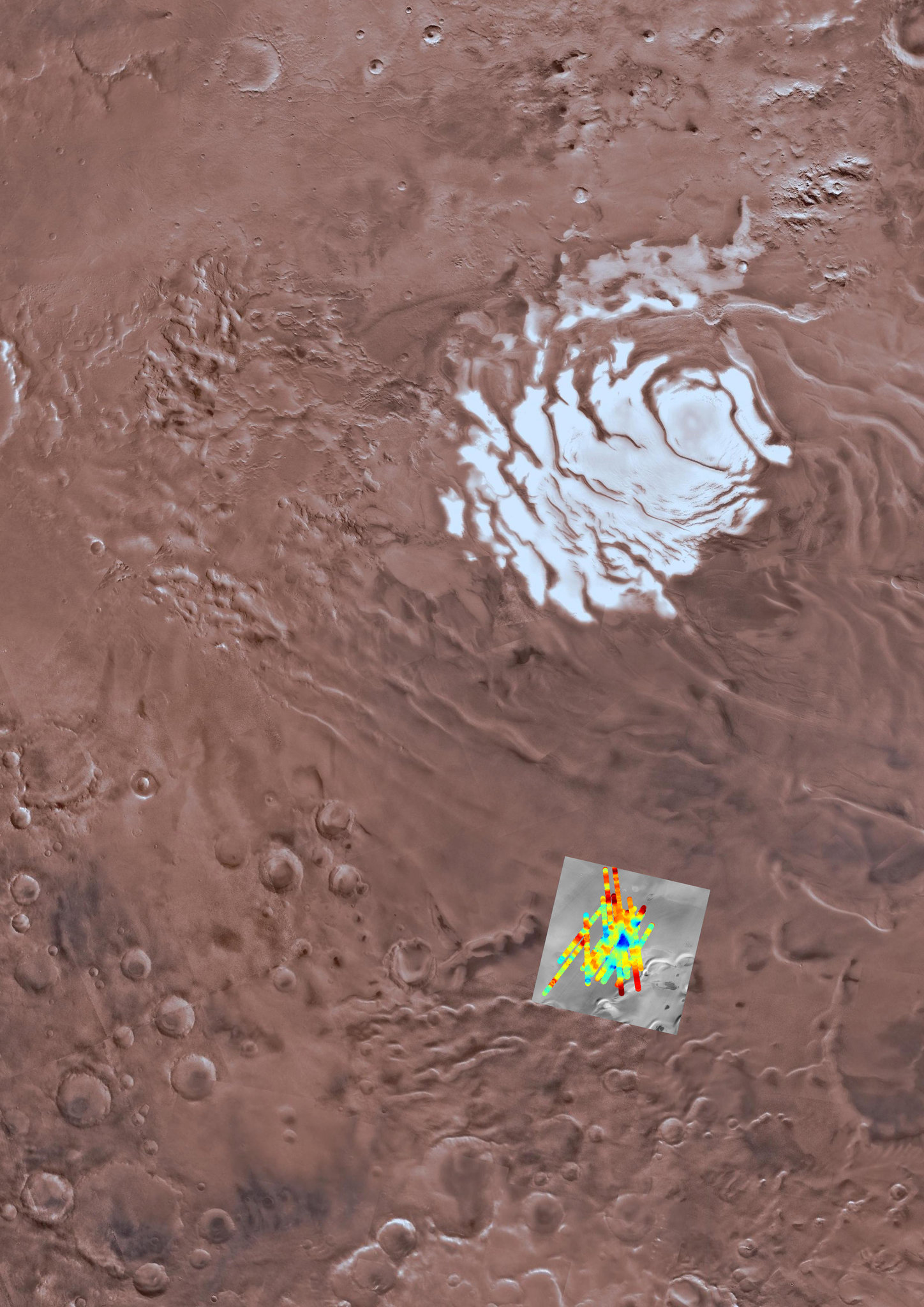
25 July: Radar image of a subglacial lake on Mars.

- 25 July
  - Scientists report the discovery, based on MARSIS radar studies, of a subglacial lake on Mars, 1.5 km (0.93 mi) below the southern polar ice cap (see image), and extending sideways about 20 km (12 mi), the first known stable body of water on the planet.
  - NASA's Transiting Exoplanet Survey Satellite (TESS) begins science operations.
  - Researchers in Brazil describe a new two-dimensional material called "hematene", derived from hematite, with application as a photocatalyst.
- 27 July – The longest total lunar eclipse of the 21st century occurs.
- 28 July – Artificial intelligence is used to demonstrate a link between personality type and eye movements.
- 30 July
  - Using high-resolution satellite images, researchers from the Chizé Centre for Biological Studies report an 88% reduction in the world's biggest colony of king penguins, found on Île aux Cochons in the subantarctic Crozet Archipelago.
  - A study by NASA's Goddard Space Flight Center concludes that terraforming of Mars is physically impossible with present-day technology.
- 31 July – Astronomers report the detection of an extremely strong magnetic field and aurora around a brown dwarf, which may possibly be a rogue planet, designated SIMP J01365663+0933473.

=== August ===
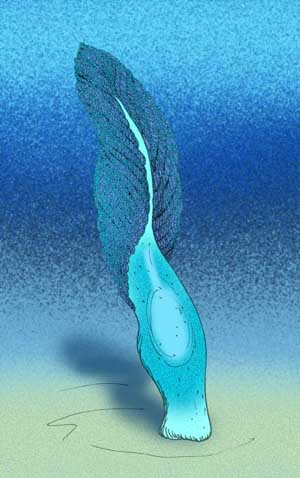
8 August: Stromatoveris psygmoglena, which dominated oceans a half billion years ago, found to be a member of Animalia.

- 1 August
  - Earth Overshoot Day 2018 is reached.
  - Astronomers report that FRB 180725A is the first detection of a Fast radio burst (FRB) under 700 MHz – as low as 580 MHz.
  - Lab-grown lungs are successfully transplanted into pigs for the first time.
- 7 August – NASA researchers report confirmation by the New Horizons spacecraft of a "hydrogen wall" at the outer edges of the Solar System that was first detected in 1992 by the two Voyager spacecraft.
- 8 August
  - Biologists report that Stromatoveris psygmoglena, an Ediacaran organism that dominated oceans half a billion years ago, was a member of Animalia, based on phylogenetic analysis.
  - Computer researchers report that Artificial Intelligence (AI) programs have found thousands of prominent scientists overlooked by Wikipedia editors.
- 9 August – Researchers in China establish a new record for organic photovoltaic cells, boosting their maximum efficiency from 15 to 17.3 percent.
- 12 August – A Delta IV Heavy launches the Parker Solar Probe to study the Sun and the solar wind.
- 13 August – Astronomers at the Chandra X-ray Observatory report that the X-ray afterglow from a one-year-old neutron star merger—associated with GW170817 (gravitational wave), GRB 170817A (gamma ray burst) and AT 2017gfo (visible transient)—is fading at an increasingly rapid rate at 358.6 days after the event.
- 14 August
  - Computer researchers report discovering another security vulnerability, named "Foreshadow", that may affect Intel processors inside personal computers and in third party clouds.
  - Groundbreaking begins on the Giant Magellan Telescope in Chile. It is expected to be operational by 2024.
- 15 August – Astronomers report the detection of iron and titanium vapours in the atmosphere of an 'ultra-hot Jupiter' in close orbit around the large B-type star, KELT-9.

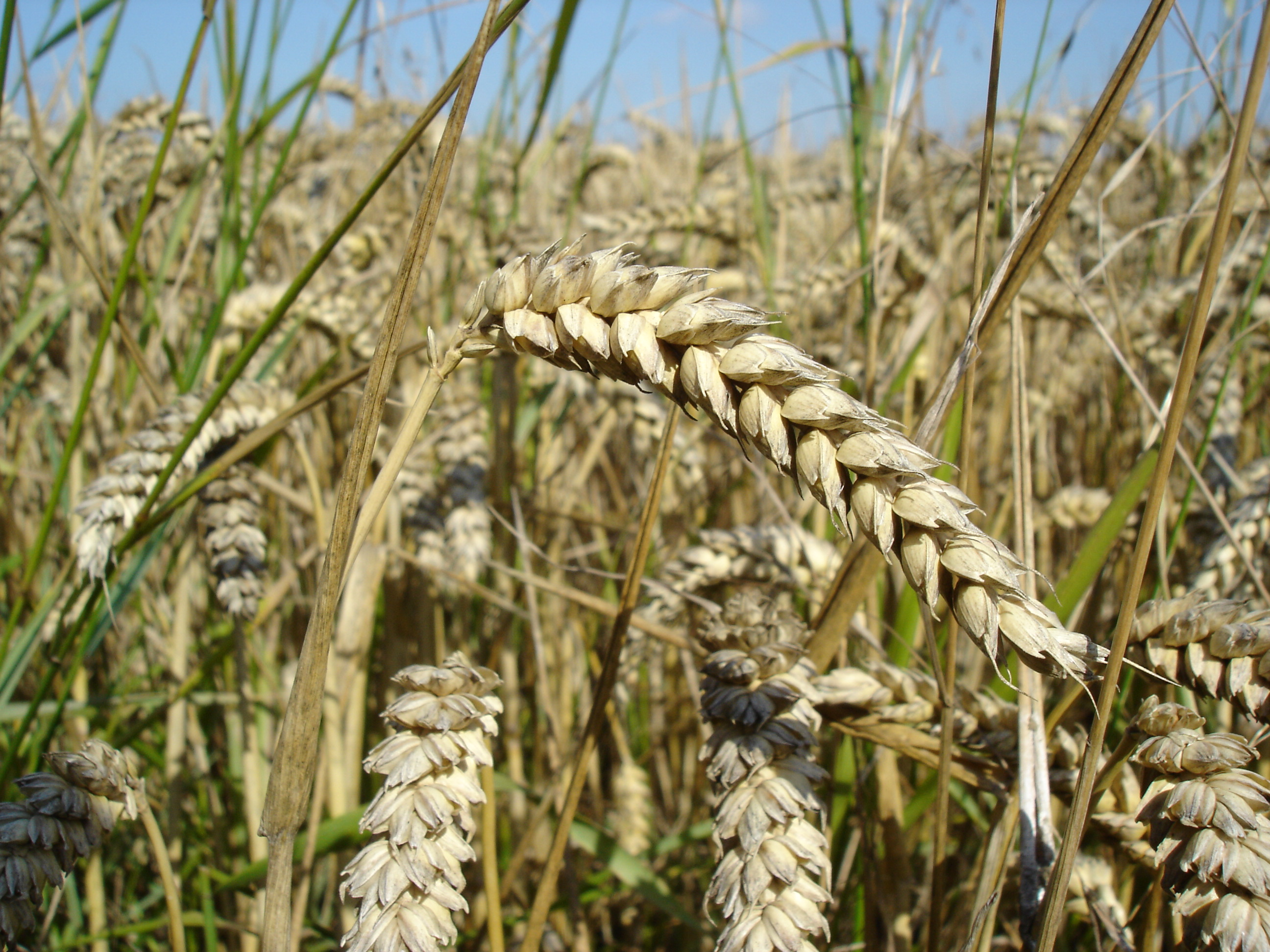
16 August: First complete map of the wheat genome.

- 16 August
  - Scientists announce the transformation of gaseous deuterium into a liquid metallic form. This may help researchers better understand giant gas planets, such as Jupiter, Saturn and related exoplanets, since such planets are thought to contain a lot of liquid metallic hydrogen, which may be responsible for their observed powerful magnetic fields.
  - The wheat genome is fully sequenced after a 13-year effort.
  - Scientists at Sandia National Laboratories reveal a platinum-gold alloy believed to be the most wear-resistant metal in the world, 100 times more durable than high-strength steel.
- 18 August – Research presented at the Goldschmidt conference in Boston concludes that water is likely to be a common feature of exoplanets between two and four times the size of Earth, with implications for the search of life in our Galaxy.
- 20 August
  - Scientists report that life, based on genetic and fossil evidences, may have begun on Earth nearly 4.5 billion years ago, much earlier than thought before.
  - Researchers report that the skyglow of STEVE ("Strong Thermal Emission Velocity Enhancement"), an atmospheric optical phenomenon appearing as a purple and green light ribbon in the sky, and not an aurora, is not associated with particle precipitation (electrons or ions) and, as a result, could be generated in the ionosphere.
- 21 August – Scientists announce the first direct evidence for exposed water-ice on the Moon's surface, which is found in permanently shaded regions.
- 22 August
  - Scientists report evidence of a 13-year-old hominin female, nicknamed Denny, estimated to have lived 90,000 years ago, and who was determined to be half Neanderthal and half Denisovan, based on genetic analysis of a bone fragment discovered in Denisova Cave; the first time an ancient individual was discovered whose parents belonged to distinct human groups.
  - Researchers report evidence of rapid shifts (in geological-time terms), nearly 30 times faster than known previously, of geomagnetic reversals, where the north magnetic pole of Earth becomes the south magnetic pole and vice versa, including a chronozone that lasted only 200 years, much shorter than any other such reversal found earlier.
- 28 August – Physicists officially report, for the first time, observing the Higgs boson decay into a pair of bottom quarks, an interaction that is primarily responsible for the "natural width" (range of masses with which a particle is observed) of the boson.
- 30 August – Researchers from the Chinese University of Hong Kong report a new way of controlling nanobots, using swarm behaviours to do complex tasks in minimally invasive surgeries.

=== September ===
3 September: Hexagon (in 2013 and 2017) at the north pole on the planet Saturn may be a jet stream of atmospheric gases moving at 320 km/h (200 mph) and 300 km (190 mi) high.

- 3 September – Astronomers present evidence that the 32,000 km (20,000 mi) wide hexagon at the north pole of the planet Saturn (possibly a jet stream of atmospheric gases moving at 320 km/h (200 mph)) may be 300 km (190 mi) high, well into the stratosphere, at least during the northern spring and summer, rather than lower in the troposphere as thought earlier.
- 6 September – A study by the University of Illinois at Urbana–Champaign finds that large-scale solar panels and wind turbines in the Sahara desert would have a major impact on rainfall, vegetation and temperatures – potentially greening the region.
- 7 September
  - Researchers at the National Geospatial-Intelligence Agency release a high resolution terrain map (detail down to the size of a car, and less in some areas) of Antarctica, named the "Reference Elevation Model of Antarctica" (REMA).
  - A group of Japanese and American scientists publish a research paper which concludes that "space weathering" on the surface of Phobos, in tandem with its eccentric orbit, has caused its surface to be divided into two distinct geologic units, known as the red and blue units.
- 9 September – Astronomers report detecting another 72 Fast Radio Bursts (FRBs), using artificial intelligence, from FRB 121102 that had been missed earlier, resulting in about 300 total FRBs from this object. FRB 121102 is the only known repeating fast radio source which is very unusual since all other currently known FRBs (very powerful and extremely short-lived astronomical objects) have not been found to repeat, occurring one time only.

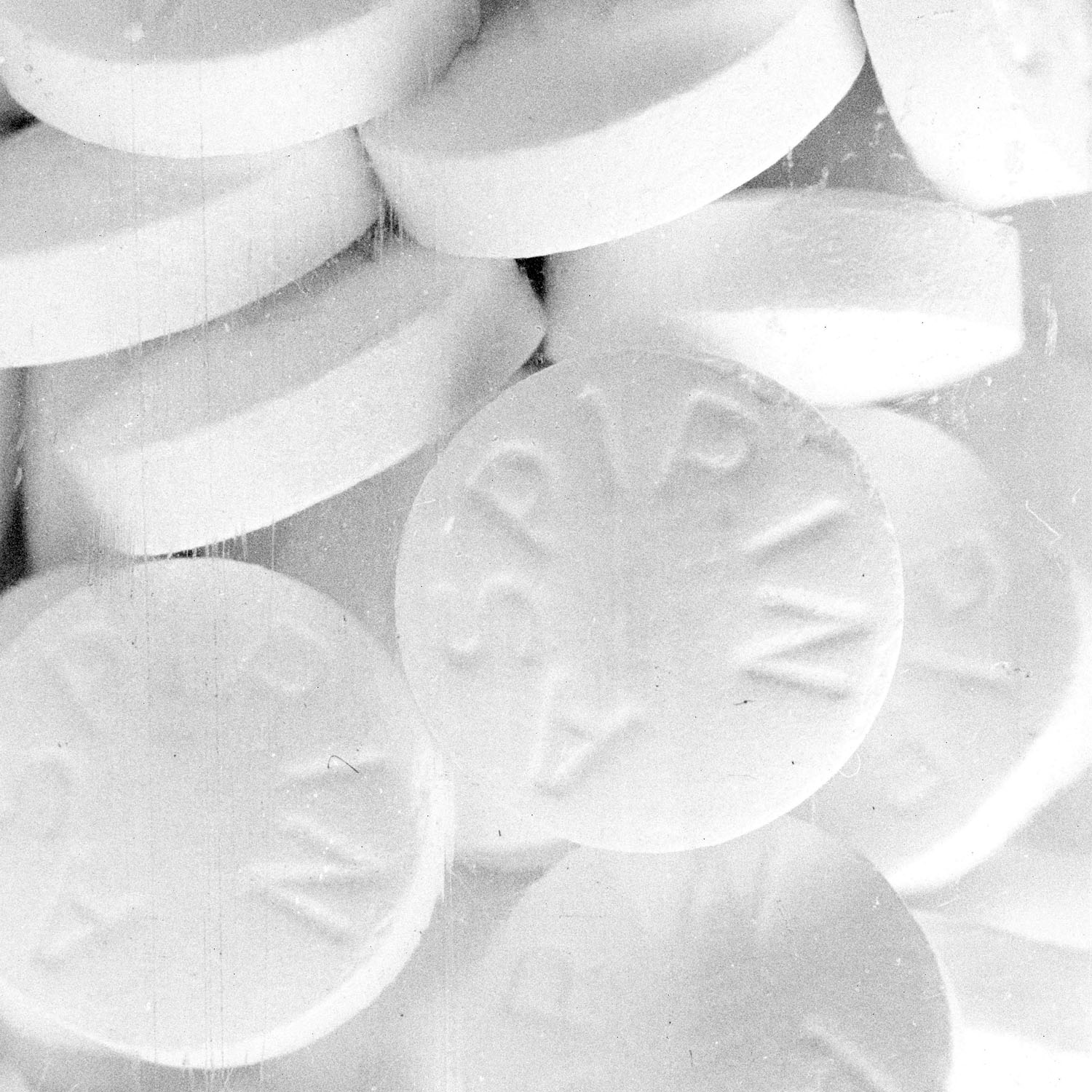
16 September: Medical study: use of low-dose aspirin by older healthy people may not be beneficial and, in some case, may be harmful.

- 10 September
  - NASA wins an Emmy Award for Outstanding Original Interactive Program for its presentation of the Cassini mission's Grand Finale at Saturn.
  - The Massachusetts Institute of Technology (MIT) announces "Dense Object Nets" (DON), a new system that allows robots to pick up any object after visually inspecting it.
  - An international team of researchers predict the entire set of beneficial 3D distortions for controlling edge localised modes (ELMs) in tokamak plasma, without creating more problems.
- 12 September – Scientists report the discovery of the earliest known drawing by Homo sapiens, which is estimated to be 73,000 years old, much earlier than the 43,000 years old artifacts understood to be the earliest known modern human drawings found previously.
- 15 September – NASA launches ICESat-2, the agency's most technologically advanced ice-monitoring spacecraft to date.
- 16 September
  - Astronomers report determining that the warm-hot intergalactic medium (or WHIM) may be where the missing matter (not dark matter) has been hiding in the universe.
  - Medical researchers conclude, based on a 19,114 person study conducted over five years, that use of low-dose aspirin by older healthy people may not be beneficial and, in some case, may be harmful.
- 17 September – NASA releases the first light image (see image) (taken on 7 August 2018) by the Transiting Exoplanet Survey Satellite (TESS), a space telescope designed to search for exoplanets in an area 400 times larger than that covered by the Kepler mission.

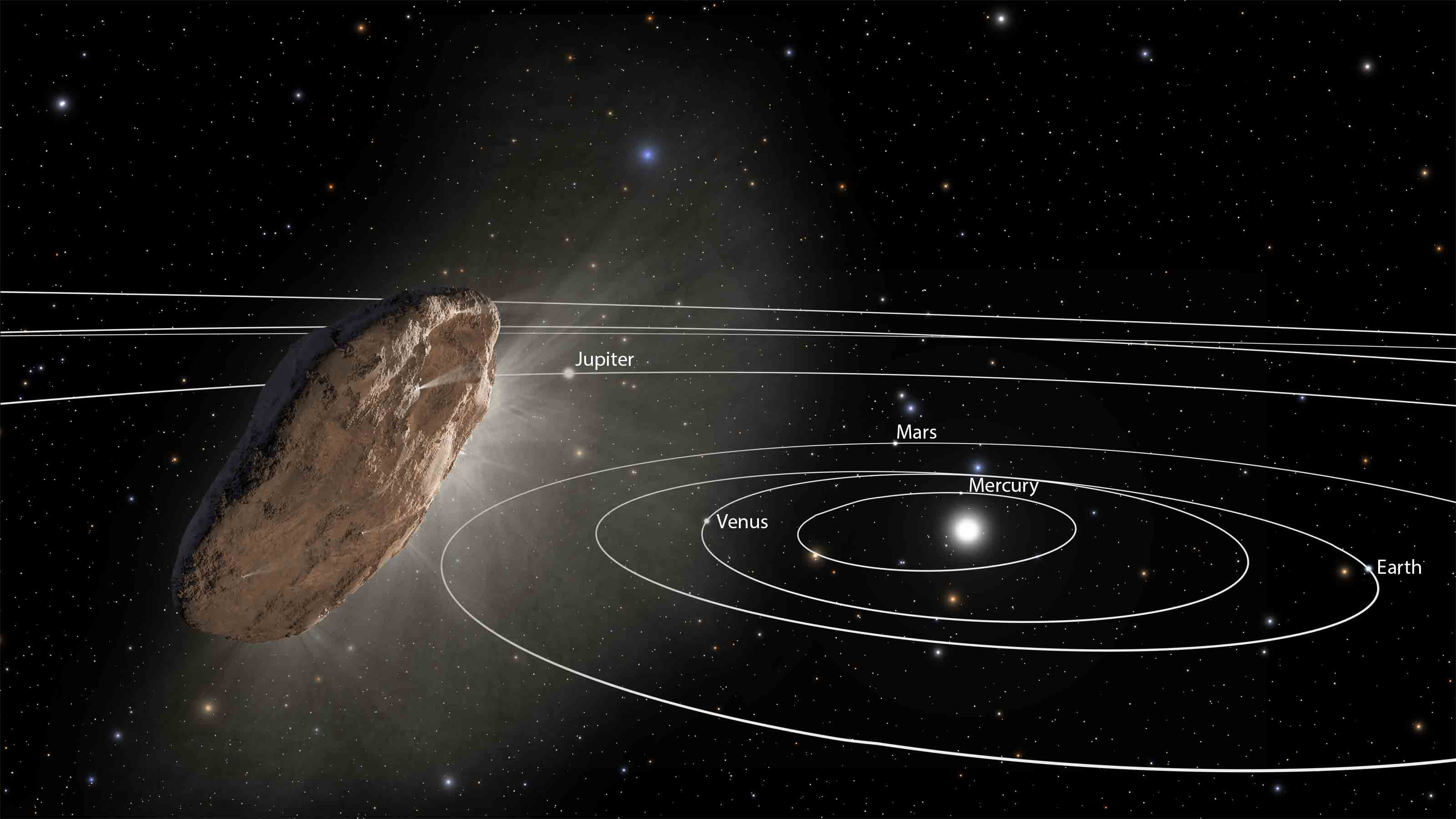
24 September: Astronomers describe several possible star systems from where ʻOumuamua, an interstellar object passing through the Solar System, may have begun its journey.

- 20 September
  - Researchers at Cincinnati Children's Hospital Medical Center report the first human oesophageal tissue grown entirely from pluripotent stem cells.
  - Researchers identify human skeletal stem cells for the first time.
  - Scientists discover molecules of fat in an ancient fossil to reveal the earliest confirmed animal in the geological record that lived on Earth 558 million years ago.
  - A paper in the Cryosphere journal, from the European Geosciences Union, suggests that building walls on the seafloor could halt the slide of undersea glaciers, which are melting due to warmer ocean temperatures.
  - Using data from the European Space Agency's X-ray observatory XMM-Newton, astronomers report the first detection of matter falling into a black hole at 30% of the speed of light, located in the centre of the billion-light year distant galaxy PG211+143.
- 21 September – The Japanese Hayabusa2 probe deploys two landers on the surface of the large asteroid Ryugu.
- 24 September
  - Data from the Cassini–Huygens spacecraft, which explored Saturn and its moons between 2004 and 2017, reveals what appear to be three giant dust storms (see image), for the first time, in the equatorial regions of the moon Titan between the years 2009 and 2010.
  - Astronomers describe several possible home star systems from which the interstellar object ʻOumuamua, found passing through the Solar System in October 2017, may have begun its interstellar journey. Studies suggest that the interstellar object is neither an asteroid nor a comet.

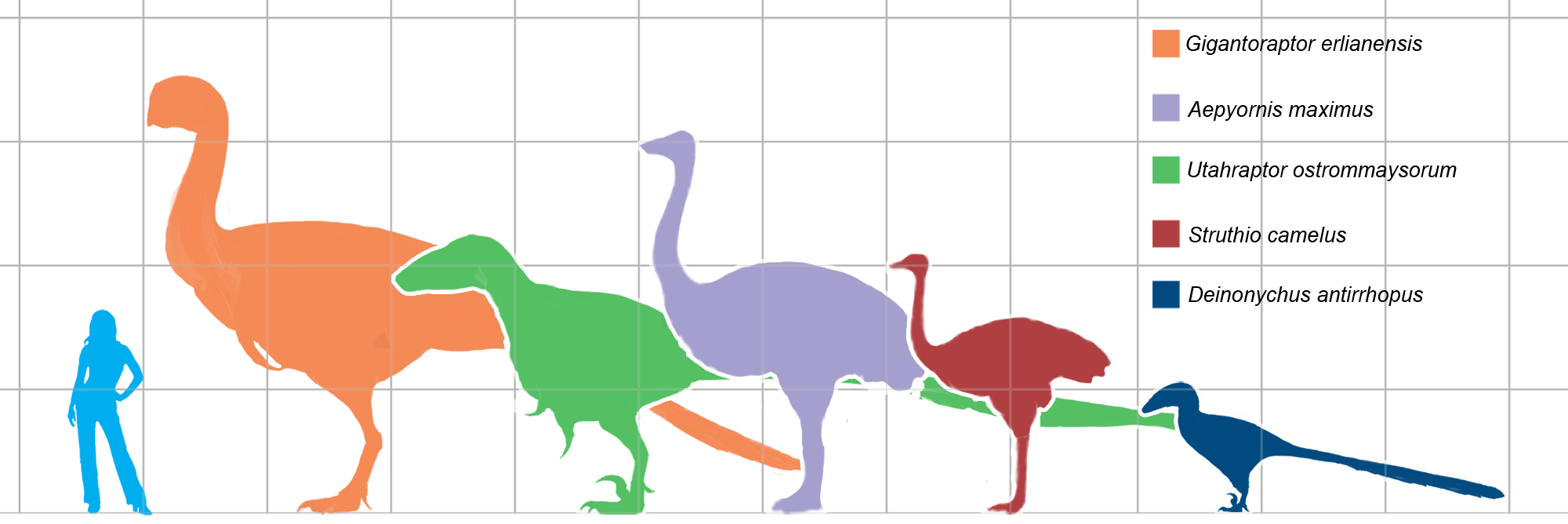
25 September: Vorombe titan (similar to purple above; maroon, an ostrich; all others non-avian theropod dinosaurs), an extinct elephant bird, determined to be the largest bird known to have existed.

- 25 September
  - Medical researchers report that Omega-3 fatty acids may significantly reduce the risk of cardiovascular events in some patients with a history of heart disease or type 2 diabetes.
  - Scientists determine that Vorombe titan, an extinct elephant bird from the island of Madagascar which reached weights of 800 kg (1,800 lb) and heights of 3 m (9.8 ft) tall, is the largest bird known to have existed.
- 26 September – Researchers provide evidence that phosphorus compounds, key components for life, are made in interstellar space and distributed throughout outer space, including the early Earth.
- 27 September – A study in the journal Science concludes that polychlorinated biphenyls (PCBs) could halve killer whale populations in the most heavily contaminated areas within 30–50 years.

=== October ===
- 1 October
  - James P. Allison from the United States and Tasuku Honjo from Japan win the Nobel Prize in Physiology or Medicine "for their discovery of cancer therapy by inhibition of negative immune regulation."
  - NASA-funded researchers find that lengthy journeys into outer space, including travel to the planet Mars, may substantially damage the gastrointestinal tissues of astronauts. The studies support earlier work that found such journeys could significantly damage the brains of astronauts, and age them prematurely. However, unlike the conditions in space, the study admitted the full radiation doses over short periods.
  - Astronomers announce the discovery of 2015 TG387 (also known as "The Goblin"), a trans-Neptunian object and sednoid in the outermost part of the Solar System, which may help explain some apparent effects of a hypothetical planet named Planet Nine (or Planet X).

3 October: Evidence presented for first known exomoon, which may be orbiting exoplanet Kepler-1625b.

- 2 October
  - Arthur Ashkin from the United States, Gérard Mourou from France and Donna Strickland from Canada win the Nobel Prize in Physics "for groundbreaking inventions in the field of laser physics".
  - Astronomers using data from the Gaia mission report the discovery of rogue, high-velocity stars hurtling towards the Milky Way, possibly originating from another galaxy.
- 3 October
  - Frances H. Arnold from the United States, George P. Smith from the United States and Gregory P. Winter from the United Kingdom win the Nobel Prize in Chemistry for their work in evolutionary science.
  - Astronomers publish details of a candidate exomoon, Kepler-1625b I, suggesting it has a mass and radius similar to Neptune, and orbits the exoplanet Kepler-1625b.
- 4 October – Researchers at McMaster University announce the development of a new technology, called a Planet Simulator, to help study the origin of life on planet Earth and beyond.
- 5 October – The Hubble Space Telescope is hit by a mechanical failure as it loses one of the gyroscopes needed for pointing the spacecraft. It is placed into "safe" mode while scientists attempt to fix the problem.
- 8 October
  - The IPCC releases its Special Report on Global Warming of 1.5 °C, warning that "rapid, far-reaching and unprecedented changes in all aspects of society" are needed to keep global warming below 1.5 °C.
  - Researchers report low-temperature chemical pathways from simple organic compounds to complex polycyclic aromatic hydrocarbon (PAH) chemicals. Such chemical pathways may help explain the presence of PAHs in the low-temperature atmosphere of Titan, a moon of the planet Saturn, and may be significant pathways, in terms of the PAH world hypothesis, in producing precursors to biochemicals related to life as we know it.

8 October: IPCC releases Special Report on Global Warming, noting the need to keep global warming below 1.5°C.

- 10 October
  - Astronomers report 19 more new non-repeating FRB bursts detected by the Australian Square Kilometre Array Pathfinder (ASKAP).
  - Physicists report producing quantum entanglement using living organisms, particularly between living bacteria and quantized light.
- 11 October
  - Physicists report that quantum behavior can be explained with classical physics for a single particle, but not for multiple particles as in quantum entanglement and related nonlocality phenomena ("spooky action at a distance" ["gruselige Action in einiger Entfernung" (German)], according to Albert Einstein). (Note: Physicist John Bell depicts the Einstein camp in this debate in his article entitled "Bertlmann's socks and the nature of reality", p. 143 of Speakable and unspeakable in quantum mechanics: "For EPR that would be an unthinkable 'spooky action at a distance'. To avoid such action at a distance they have to attribute, to the space-time regions in question, real properties in advance of observation, correlated properties, which predetermine the outcomes of these particular observations. Since these real properties, fixed in advance of observation, are not contained in quantum formalism, that formalism for EPR is incomplete. It may be correct, as far as it goes, but the usual quantum formalism cannot be the whole story." And again on p. 144 Bell says: "Einstein had no difficulty accepting that affairs in different places could be correlated. What he could not accept was that an intervention at one place could influence, immediately, affairs at the other.")
  - Harvard astronomers present an analytical model that suggests matter—and potentially dormant spores—can be exchanged across the vast distances between galaxies, a process termed 'galactic panspermia', and not be restricted to the limited scale of solar systems.
  - The world's fastest camera, able to capture 10 trillion frames per second, is announced by the Institut national de la recherche scientifique (INRS) in Quebec, Canada.
- 15 October – A study by the Rensselaer Polytechnic Institute finds that insect populations in Puerto Rico have crashed since the 1970s, with some species witnessing a 60-fold decrease in numbers. The fall is attributed to a 2.0 °C rise in tropical forest temperatures.
- 16 October
  - The final published book by physicist Stephen Hawking, entitled Brief Answers to the Big Questions, is released.
  - A comprehensive analysis of demographic trends published in The Lancet predicts that all countries are likely to experience at least a slight increase in life expectancy by 2040. Spain is expected to overtake Japan as it rises from fourth to first place, with an average lifespan of 85.8 years.
  - Astronomers report that GRB 150101B, a gamma-ray burst event detected in 2015, may be directly related to the historic GW170817, a gravitational wave event detected in 2017, and associated with the merger of two neutron stars. The similarities between the two events, in terms of gamma ray, optical and x-ray emissions, as well as to the nature of the associated host galaxies, are "striking", suggesting the two separate events may both be the result of the merger of neutron stars, and both may be a kilonova (i.e., a luminous flash of radioactive light that produces elements like silver, gold, platinum and uranium), which may be more common in the universe than previously understood, according to the researchers.

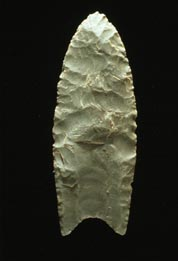
24 October: Oldest weapons, chert spear points, dated as early as 15,500 years ago, found in North America [note: similar, but more recent, clovis point pictured]

- 17 October
  - Researchers report possible transgenerational epigenetic inheritance (i.e., transmission of information from one generation of an organism to the next that affects the traits of offspring without alteration of the primary structure of DNA) in the form of paternal transmission of epigenetic memory via of sperm chromosomes in the roundworm Caenorhabditis elegans, a laboratory test organism.
  - A study by Stanford University finds that the use of virtual reality can induce greater compassion in people than other forms of media.
- 20 October – The joint ESA/JAXA BepiColombo probe is launched to the planet Mercury.
- 22 October
  - A study by the University at Albany forecasts that Peru's Quelccaya ice cap will reach a state of irreversible retreat by the mid-2050s, if current warming trends continue.
  - Researchers at the University of Queensland recreated 450 million-year-old enzymes with thermostable proteins, which can withstand higher temperatures, and could be used to improve drugs and gene therapy.
- 24 October – Scientists report discovering the oldest weapons found in North America, ancient spear points, dated to 13,500 – 15,500 years ago, made of chert, predating the clovis culture (typically dated to 13,000 years ago), in the state of Texas.
- 26 October – Astronomers confirm the existence of dust cloud satellites, called Kordylewski clouds, in semi-stable regions (the L4 and L5 Lagrangian points of the Earth–Moon system) about 400,000 km (250,000 mi) above the planet Earth.
- 30 October
  - NASA announces that the Kepler space telescope, having run out of fuel, and after nine years of service and the discovery of over 2,600 exoplanets, has been officially retired, and will maintain its current, safe orbit, away from Earth.
  - Scientists announce the 3D virtual reconstruction, for the first time, of a Neanderthal rib cage, which may help researchers better understand how this ancient human species moved and breathed.

=== November ===
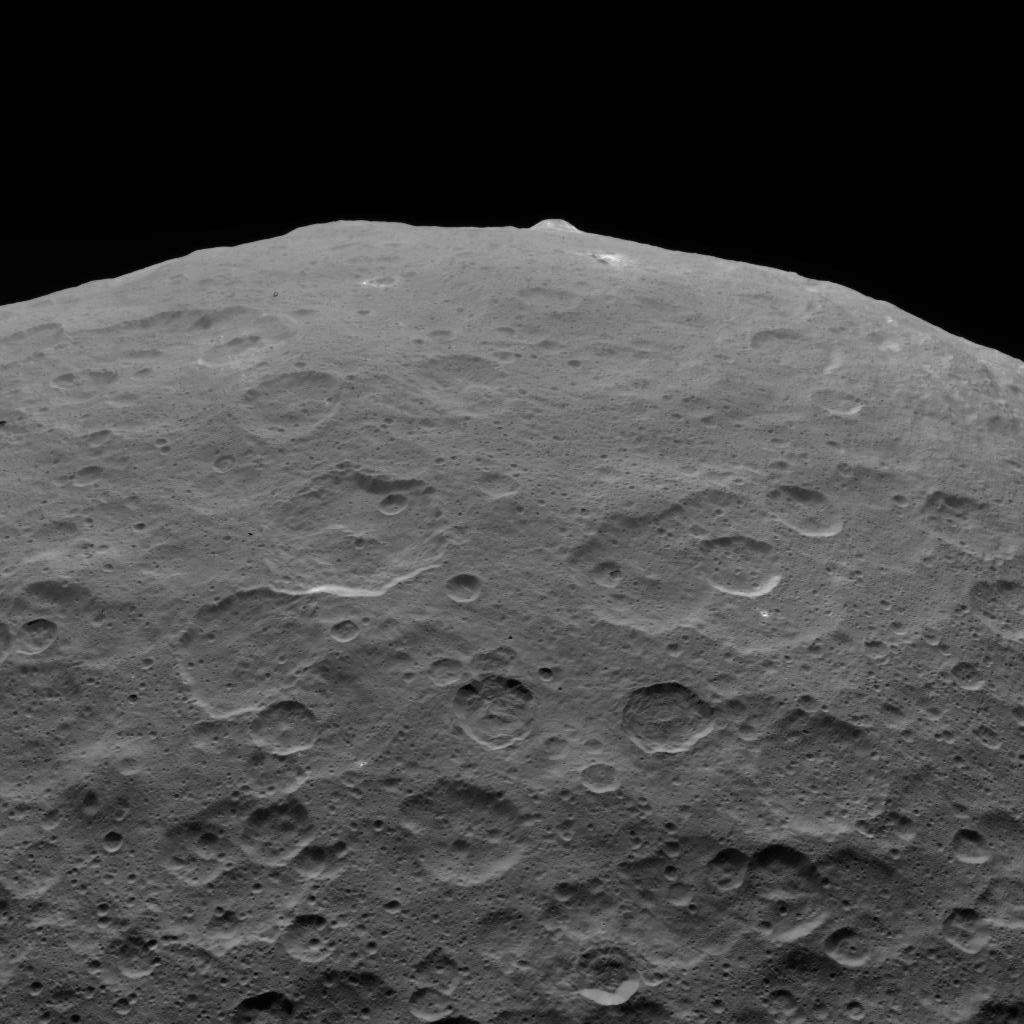
Ahuna Mons

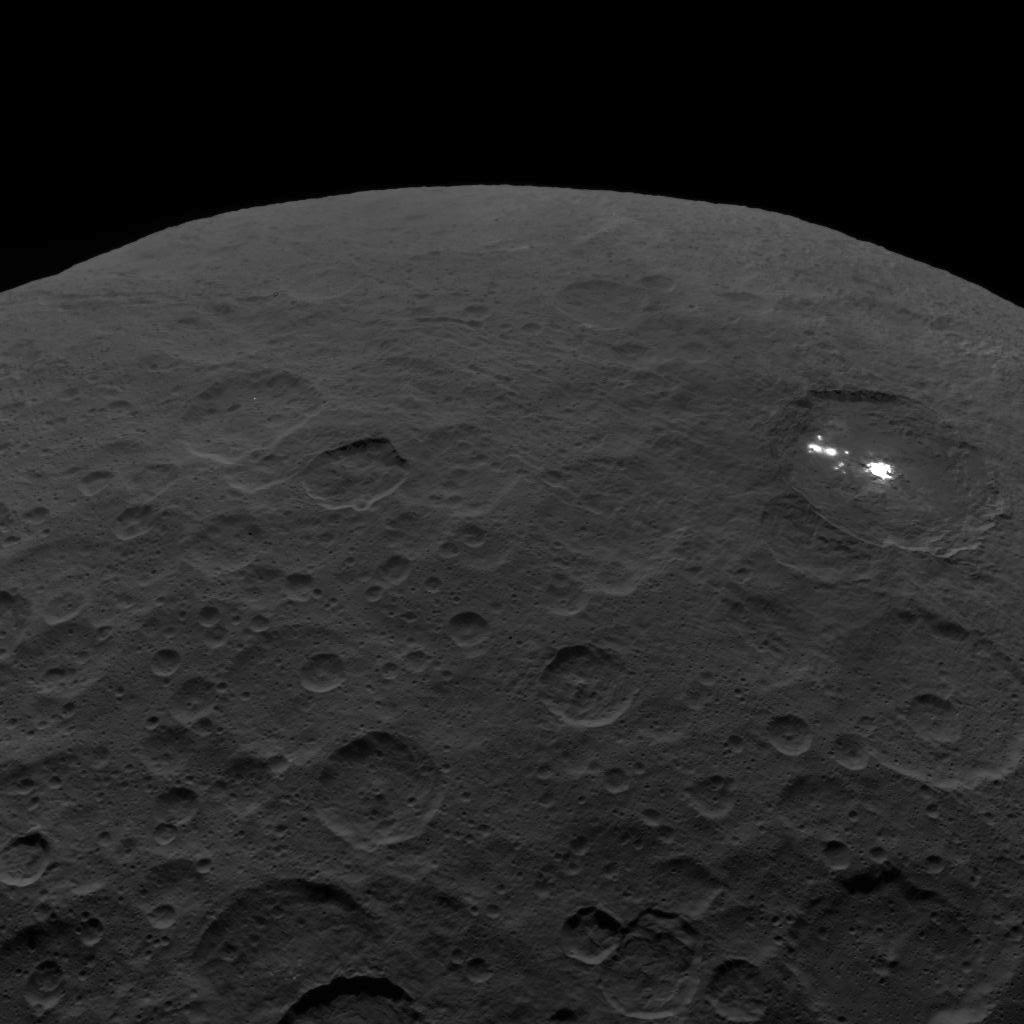
Occator Crater

1 November: The Dawn spacecraft, that studied protoplanets, Ceres and Vesta, is retired after an 11 year mission – last views pictured.
- 1 November
  - The Earth BioGenome Project is launched, a 10-year global effort to sequence the genomes of all 1.5 million known animal, plant, protozoan and fungal species on Earth.
  - NASA announces the official retirement, due to the depletion of fuel, of the Dawn spacecraft mission, that lasted 11 years, and that studied two protoplanets, Vesta and Ceres. The spacecraft will remain in a relatively stable orbit around Ceres for at least the next 20 years, serving as a "monument" to the mission.
  - Russian scientists release a video recording of the Soyuz MS-10 crewed spaceflight mission involving a Soyuz-FG rocket after launch on 11 October 2018 that, due to a faulty sensor, resulted in the destruction of the rocket. The crew, NASA astronaut Nick Hague and Russian cosmonaut Aleksey Ovchinin. escaped safely and successfully.
  - Astronomers from Harvard University suggest that the interstellar object ʻOumuamua may be an extraterrestrial solar sail from an alien civilization, in an effort to help explain the object's "peculiar acceleration".
- 2 November
  - Two independent teams of astronomers both conclude, based on numerous observations from other astronomers around the world, that the unusual AT2018cow event (also known as Supernova 2018cow, SN 2018cow, and "The Cow"), a very powerful astronomical explosion, 10 – 100 times brighter than a normal supernova detected on 16 June 2018, was "either a newly formed black hole in the process of accreting matter, or the frenetic rotation of a neutron star."
  - The world's largest neuromorphic supercomputer, the million-core 'SpiNNaker' machine, is switched on by the University of Manchester, England.

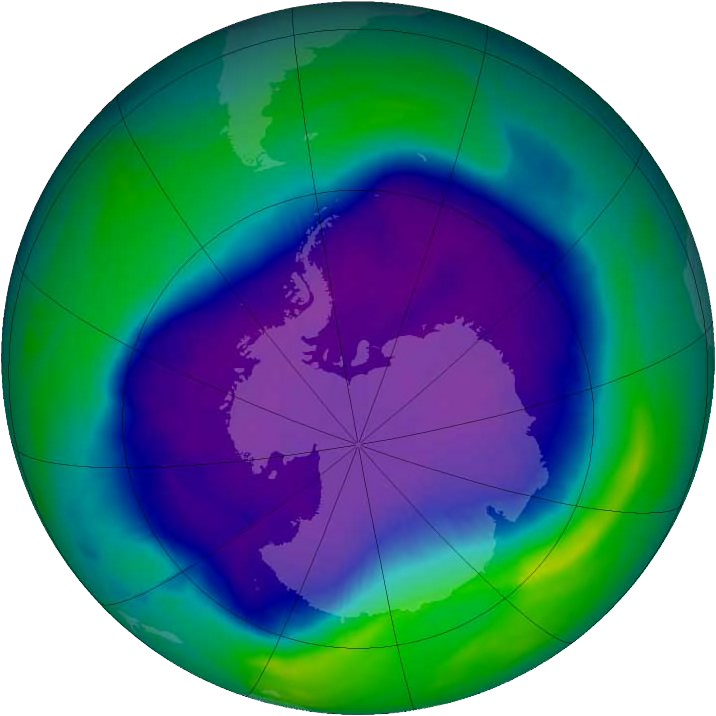
5 November: Polar ozone holes are healing faster than previously thought, and are expected to completely heal by 2060.

- 4 November – Geologists present evidence, based on studies in Gale Crater by the Curiosity rover, that there was plenty of water on early Mars.
- 5 November
  - Astronomers report the discovery of one of the oldest stars, named 2MASS J18082002-5104378 B, in the universe, about 13.5 billion-years-old, possibly one of the first stars, a tiny ultra metal-poor (UMP) star made almost entirely of materials released from the Big Bang. The discovery of the star in the Milky Way galaxy suggests that the galaxy may be at least 3 billion years older than thought earlier.
  - A new assessment of the ozone hole, published by the UN, shows it to be recovering faster than previously thought. At projected rates, the Northern Hemisphere and mid-latitude ozone is expected to heal completely by the 2030s, followed by the Southern Hemisphere in the 2050s and polar regions by 2060.
  - Scientists report the discovery of the smallest known ape, Simiolus minutus, which weighed approximately eight pounds, and lived about 12.5 million years ago in Kenya in East Africa.
- 7 November – Scientists report the discovery of the oldest known figurative art painting, over 40,000 (perhaps as old as 52,000) years old, of an unknown animal, in the cave of Lubang Jeriji Saléh on the Indonesian island of Borneo (see image).
- 12 November – China's Institute of Plasma Physics announces that plasma in the Experimental Advanced Superconducting Tokamak (EAST) has reached 100 million degrees Celsius.
- 14 November – Astronomers report the discovery of GJ 699 b, a Super-Earth orbiting near the snow line of Barnard's Star, just six light years from Earth.

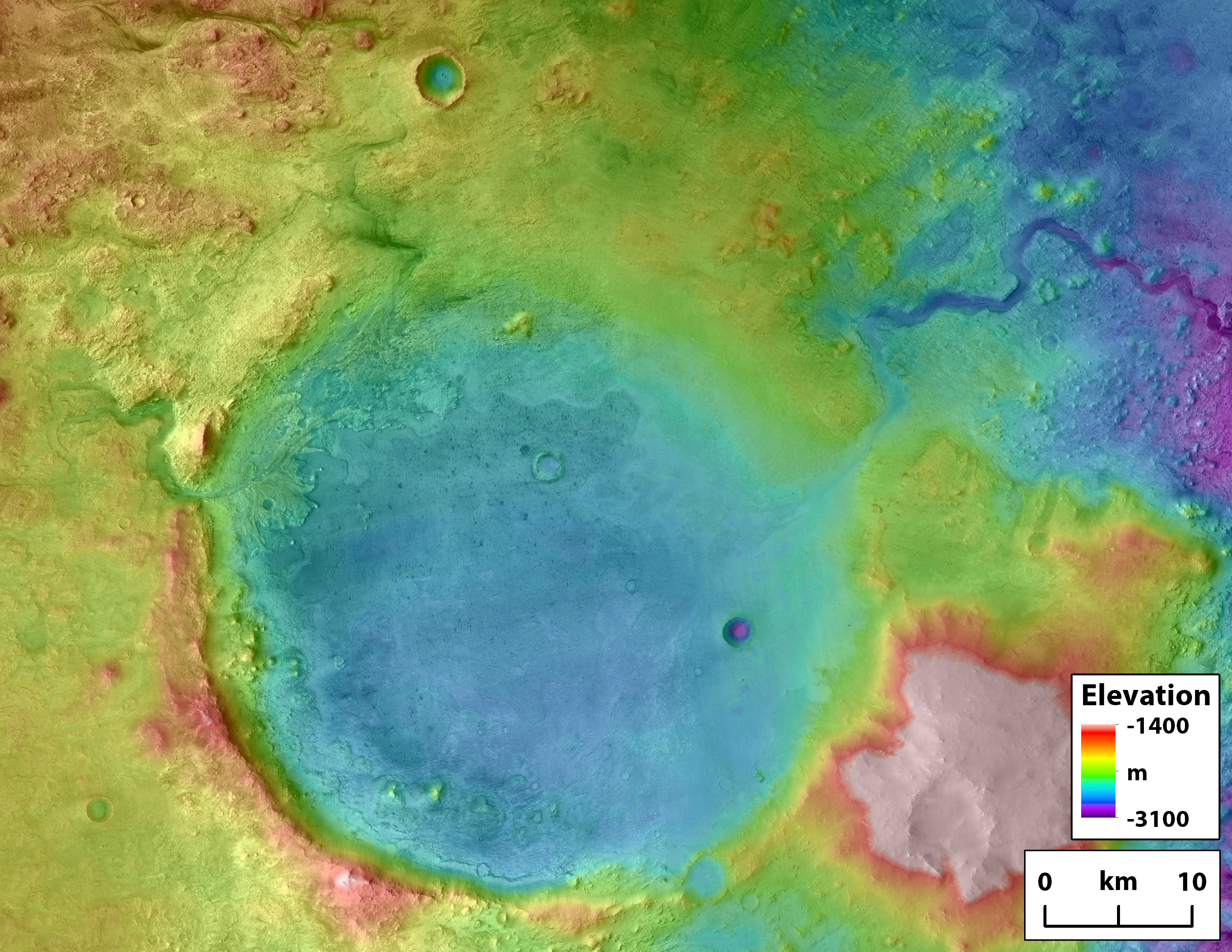
19 November: NASA chooses Jezero crater as the landing site of the Mars 2020 rover mission, to land on Mars in February 2021.

- 16 November
  - The 26th General Conference on Weights and Measures (CGPM) votes unanimously in favour of revised definitions of the SI base units, which the International Committee for Weights and Measures (CIPM) had proposed earlier that year. The new definitions come into force on 20 May 2019.
  - Researchers at Japan's National Institute of Advanced Industrial Science and Technology (AIST) reveal a humanoid robot prototype, HRP-5P, intended to autonomously perform heavy labor or work in hazardous environments.
  - Astronomers conclude that the many grooves on Phobos, one of two moons orbiting Mars, were caused by boulders, ejected from the asteroid impact that created Stickney crater (which takes up a substantial portion of the moon's surface), that rolled around on the surface of the moon.
- 19 November – NASA chooses Jezero crater on the planet Mars as the landing site for the Mars 2020 rover, which is to launch on 17 July 2020, and touch down on Mars on 18 February 2021.
- 20 November
  - Astronomers report the use of a new powerful method, NIRSpec in adaptive optics (AO) mode (NIRSPAO), to search for biosignatures on exoplanets.
  - The World Meteorological Organization (WMO) publishes its latest Greenhouse Gas Bulletin, showing record high concentrations of heat-trapping greenhouse gases, with levels of carbon dioxide (CO_{2}) reaching 405.5 parts per million (ppm) in 2017, up from 403.3 ppm in 2016 and 400.1 ppm in 2015. The WMO reports that "there is no sign of a reversal in this trend, which is driving long-term climate change, sea level rise, ocean acidification and more extreme weather."
- 22 November
  - 35 genes that predispose people to chronic kidney disease are discovered by scientists at the University of Manchester.
  - Research published in Environmental Research Letters concludes that stratospheric aerosol injection to curb global warming is "technically possible" and would be "remarkably inexpensive" at $2 to 2.5 billion per year over the first 15 years.

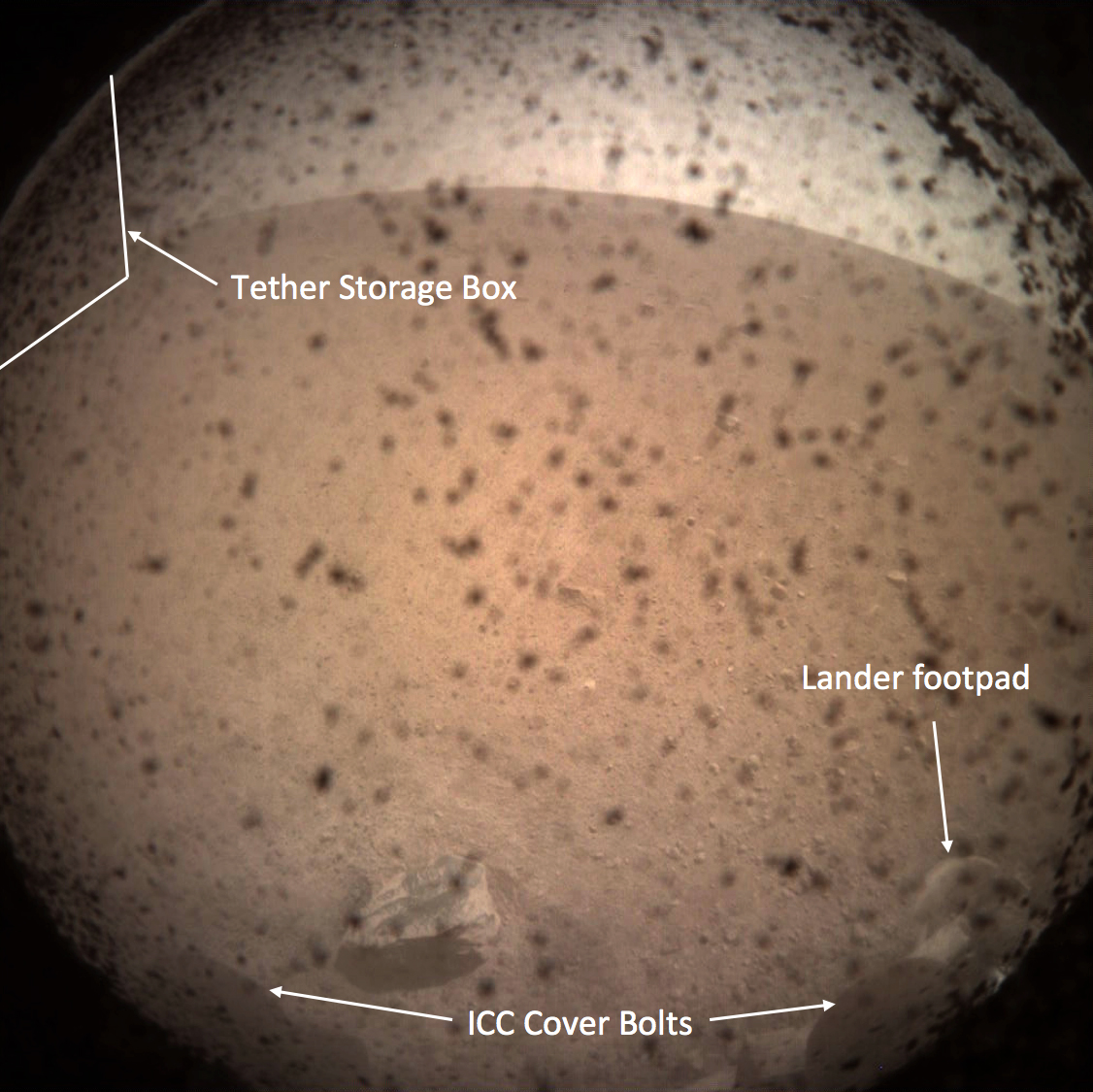
ICC camera

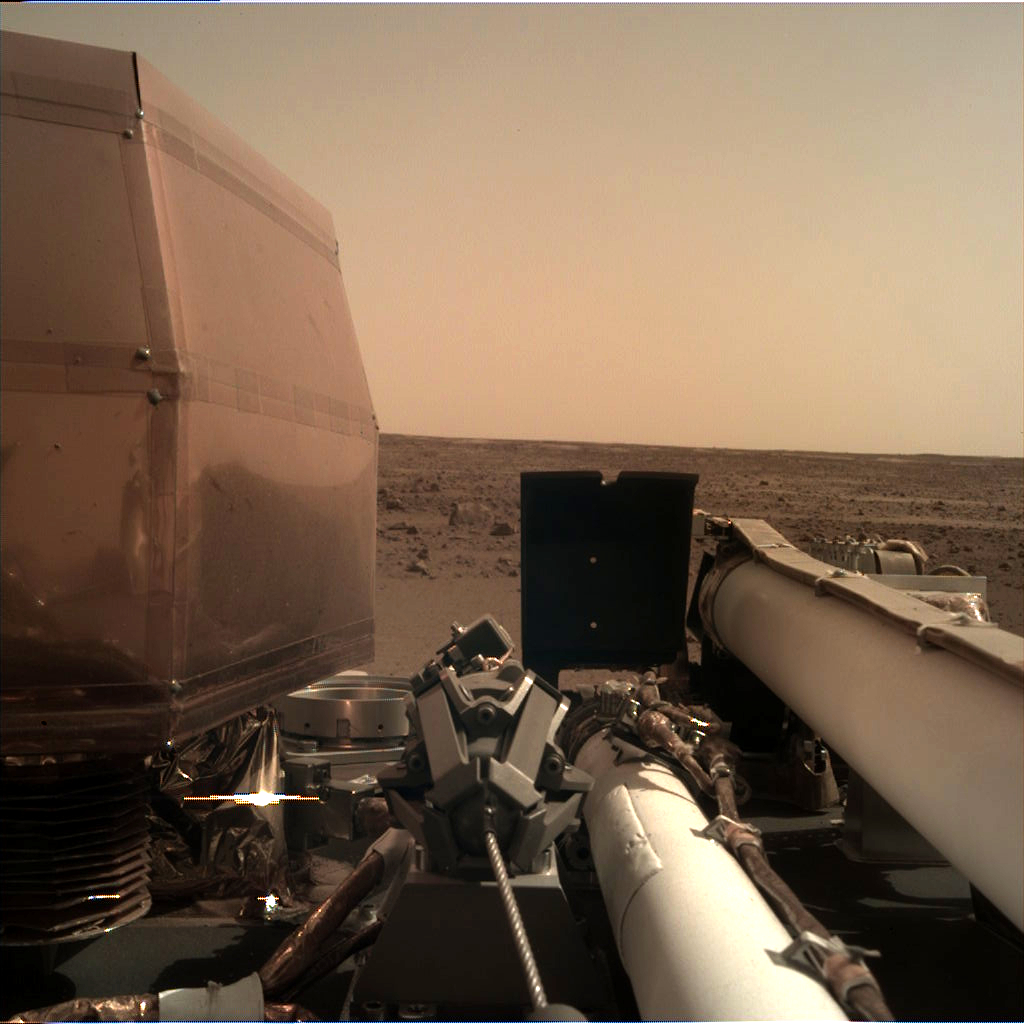
IDC camera

26 November: First light received from the InSight lander on the planet Mars.
- 23 November
  - Volume II of the Fourth National Climate Assessment (NCA4) is released by the U.S. government.
  - The Brazilian government reports that deforestation in the Amazon rainforest has reached its highest rate for a decade, with 7,900 km^{2} (3,050 sq miles) destroyed between August 2017 and July 2018, largely due to illegal logging.
  - Researchers report, after detecting the presence on the International Space Station (ISS) of five Enterobacter bugandensis bacterial strains, none pathogenic to humans, that microorganisms on ISS should be carefully monitored to continue assuring a medically healthy environment for astronauts.
- 24 November – Scientists report that nearly all extant populations of animals, including humans, may be a result of a population expansion that began between one and two hundred thousand years ago, based on genetic mitochondrial DNA studies.
- 25 November – He Jiankui affair: Chinese scientist He Jiankui reports the birth of healthy twin human girls, known as Lulu and Nana, as the world's first genome edited babies. Their embryo human genes had been CRISPR edited in an attempt to resist HIV. He is stripped of his academic posts by the Chinese authorities and subsequently imprisoned and fined heavily.
- 26 November – NASA reports that the InSight Lander landed successfully on the planet Mars. Two touch down images are received. Also, from additional received transmissions, the sounds of the winds on Mars can be heard - for the first time.
- 27 November – Researchers at the University of Southern California publish details of a freeze-dried polio vaccine that does not require refrigeration.
- 30 November – Astronomers report that the extragalactic background light (EBL), the total amount of light that has ever been released by all the stars in the observable universe, amounts to 4 × 10^{84} photons.

=== December ===
3 December: The OSIRIS-REx spacecraft arrives at asteroid Bennu after a two-year journey.

- 2–14 December – COP24 United Nations Climate Change conference in Katowice.
- 3 December – NASA reports the arrival of the OSIRIS-REx spacecraft to the carbonaceous asteroid Bennu after a two-year journey, and has determined that the asteroid interacted with water early in its history.
- 4 December – Physicists report discovery of superconductivity at 250 K and 170 GPa.
- 5 December
  - An astronomer from the University of Oxford advances a new theory, related, in part, to notions of gravitationally repulsive negative masses, presented earlier by Albert Einstein, that may help better understand, in a testable manner, the considerable amounts of unknown dark matter and dark energy in the cosmos.
  - Researchers create a new algorithm, based on deep learning, that is able to solve text-based CAPTCHA tests in less than 0.05 seconds.
  - Scientists in the United Kingdom announce completion of the 100,000 Genomes Project.
  - Research published by the Global Carbon Project shows record high carbon emissions of 37.1 billion metric tons in 2018, driven by a booming market for cars and ongoing coal use in China.
- 8 December – China launches Chang'e 4, the first mission to land a robotic craft on the far side of the Moon.
- 10 December
  - Voyager 2, a space probe launched in 1977, is confirmed (image of onboard detections) to have left the Solar System for interstellar space on 5 November 2018, six years after its sister probe, Voyager 1 (related image).
  - Four glaciers in the Vincennes Bay region of Antarctica are found to be thinning at surprisingly fast rates, casting doubt on the idea that the eastern part of the icy continent is stable.
  - Researchers announce the discovery of considerable amounts of life forms, including 70% of bacteria and archea on Earth, comprising up to 23 billion tonnes of carbon, living up to at least 4.8 km (3.0 mi) deep underground, including 2.5 km (1.6 mi) below the seabed, according to a ten-year Deep Carbon Observatory project.

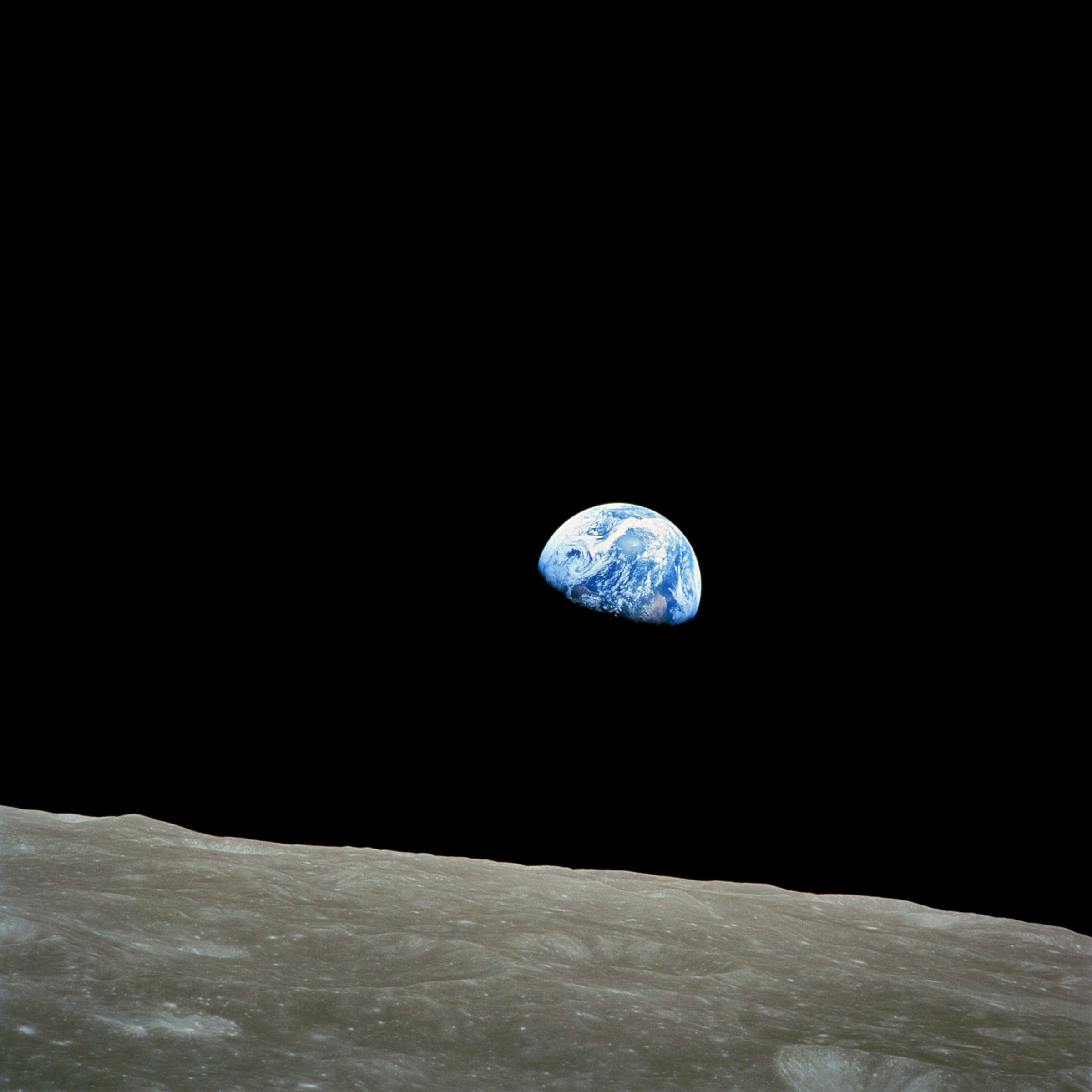
24 December: NASA celebrates the 50th Anniversary of the 1968 Christmas Eve (Earthrise) Apollo 8 trip around the Moon.

- 11 December – A report on the impact of climate change in the Arctic, published during the latest American Geophysical Union meeting, concludes that populations of wild reindeer, or caribou, have crashed from almost 5 million to just 2.1 million animals in the last two decades.
- 17 December
  - Astronomers led by Scott Sheppard announce the discovery of 2018 VG18, nicknamed "Farout", the most distant body ever observed in the Solar System at approximately 120 AU.
  - Scientists announce that the earliest feathers may have originated 250 million years ago, 70 million years earlier than previously thought.
- 18 December
  - Scientists report that the earliest flowers began about 180 million years ago, 50 million years earlier than previously thought.
  - The Kamchatka superbolide falls over the Bering Sea, near the east coast of Russia, the third largest asteroid to hit Earth since 1900. The event would not be recognized and announced until March 2019, however.
- 19 December – NASA reports that the InSight lander has deployed a seismometer on Mars, the first time a seismometer has been placed onto the surface of another planet.
- 24 December
  - NASA celebrates the 50th Anniversary of the 1968 Christmas Eve trip around the Moon by the Apollo 8 astronauts (Earthrise image).
  - Researchers at Tel Aviv University describe a process to make bioplastic polymers that don't require land or fresh water.

== Awards ==
- Fields Medal – Caucher Birkar, Alessio Figalli, Peter Scholze, Akshay Venkatesh
- Nobel Prize in Physiology or Medicine – James P. Allison and Tasuku Honjo, "for their discovery of cancer therapy by inhibition of negative immune regulation"
- Nobel Prize in Physics – Arthur Ashkin, Gérard Mourou and Donna Strickland, "for groundbreaking inventions in the field of laser physics"
- Nobel Prize in Chemistry – Frances H. Arnold, "for the directed evolution of enzymes", George P. Smith and Gregory P. Winter, "for the phage display of peptides and antibodies"

== Deaths ==
- January 5 – Thomas Bopp, American astronomer (b. 1949)
- February 1 – Barys Kit, Belarusian-American rocket scientist (b. 1910)
- February 2 – Joseph Polchinski, American theoretical physicist (b. 1954)
- February 4 – Alan Baker, British mathematician (b. 1939)
- February 5 – Donald Lynden-Bell, British astrophysicist (b. 1935)
- February 10 – Alan R. Battersby, British organic chemist (b. 1925)
- February 18 – Günter Blobel, German-American biologist and Nobel Prize laureate (b. 1936)
- February 21 – Richard E. Taylor, Canadian physicist and Nobel Prize laureate (b. 1929)
- March 6 – John Sulston, British biologist and Nobel Prize laureate (b. 1942)
- March 14 – Stephen Hawking, British theoretical physicist and cosmologist (b. 1942)
- April 7 – Peter Grünberg, German physicist and Nobel Prize laureate (b. 1939)
- May 3 – H. Basil S. Cooke, South African-born Canadian geologist and palaeontologist (b. 1915)
- May 26 – Ted Dabney, American engineer and computer scientist (b. 1937)
- June 29 – Arvid Carlsson, Swedish neuropharmacologist and Nobel Prize laureate (b. 1923)
- July 18 – Burton Richter, American physicist and Nobel Prize laureate (b. 1931)
- September 23 – Charles K. Kao, Hong Kong-American-British physicist and Nobel Prize laureate (b. 1933)
- October 3 – Leon M. Lederman, American physicist and Nobel Prize laureate (b. 1922)
- October 9 – Thomas A. Steitz, American biochemist and Nobel Prize laureate (b. 1940)
- November 26 – Stephen Hillenburg, American marine biologist and animator (b. 1961)
- December 9 – Riccardo Giacconi, Italian-American astrophysicist and Nobel Prize laureate (b. 1931)
- December 22 - Jean Bourgain, Belgian mathematician and Fields Medal laureate (b. 1954)
- December 23 - Elias M. Stein, American mathematician (b. 1931)
- December 26 - Peter Swinnerton-Dyer, English mathematician (b. 1927)
- December 26 - Roy J. Glauber, American theoretical physicist and Nobel Prize laureate (b. 1925)

== See also ==
- 2018 in spaceflight
- List of emerging technologies
- List of years in science
