= WASP-107 =

K-type star in the Virgo constellation

Observation data Epoch J2000.0 Equinox ICRS
- Constellation: Virgo
- Right ascension: 12^{h} 33^{m} 32.844^{s}
- Declination: −10° 08′ 46.23″
- Apparent magnitude (V): 11.47

Characteristics
- Evolutionary stage: Main sequence
- Spectral type: K6 or K7V

Astrometry
Radial velocity (R_{v})	+14.06±0.20 km/s
Proper motion (μ)	RA: −96.665 mas/yr Dec.: −9.372 mas/yr
Parallax (π)	15.5277±0.0260 mas
Distance	210.0 ± 0.4 ly (64.4 ± 0.1 pc)

Details
Mass	0.683+0.017 −0.016 M_{☉}
Radius	0.67±0.02 R_{☉}
Luminosity	0.132±0.003 L_{☉}
Surface gravity (log g)	4.633±0.012 cgs
Temperature	4425±70 K
Metallicity [Fe/H]	+0.02±0.09 dex
Rotation	17.1±1.0 d
Rotational velocity (v sin i)	0.507+0.072 −0.086 km/s
Age	3.4±0.7 Gyr

Other designations
- K2-235, EPIC 228724232, TOI-1905, TIC 429302040, WASP-107, TYC 5530-1795-1, 2MASS J12333284-1008461, GALAH 160403003601196

Database references
SIMBAD	data
Exoplanet Archive	data

WASP-107 (also known as TOI-1905) is a K6V-type main sequence star located 210 light-years from Earth in the constellation of Virgo. It has a mass of 0.68 solar masses with a radius of 0.67 solar radii. It has a temperature of 4425 Kelvin with a brightness of 0.132 solar luminosity and is around 3.4 billion years old.

== Planetary system ==
There are currently two exoplanets that have been discovered orbiting WASP-107; they are WASP-107b, a warm super-Neptunian planet, and WASP-107c, a gas giant planet.

The WASP-107 planetary system
Companion (in order from star)	Mass	Semimajor axis (AU)	Orbital period (days)	Eccentricity	Inclination (°)	Radius
b	0.096±0.005 M_{J}	0.0566±0.0017	5.7214742(43)	0.06±0.04	89.560(78)	0.96±0.03 R_{J}
c	≥0.36±0.04 M_{J}	—	1088+15 −16	0.28±0.07	—	—
