= ETSWAP =

ETSWAP (Emissions Trading Scheme Workflow Automation Project) is the web-based system operated by the UK Environment Agency for emitters to manage, verify and report their emissions of Carbon Dioxide (and in the future, other Greenhouse Gases), as required by the EU ETS (European Union Emissions Trading Scheme).

The structure and process of the ETSWAP system was outlined in a Mutual Understanding Document produced by the governments of the UK, Germany, Ireland and The Netherlands, which also dubbed the system "Workflow Automation Project" (WAP). The application is designed to meet the new requirements of the EU ETS resulting from the 2008/101/CE Directive.

The system is designed to facilitate completion and submission of verified emissions and benchmarking reports, viewing of approved emissions/benchmarking plans for existing operators and submission of emissions plans for new operators. As at July 2011, ETSWAP is configured for reporting of carbon emissions by the aviation sector and has been used by 600 aviation operators in the UK and 200 in the Republic of Ireland. The system is being expanded to cover emissions by fixed installations by 2012.
