= WASP-107b =

Super Neptune orbiting WASP-107

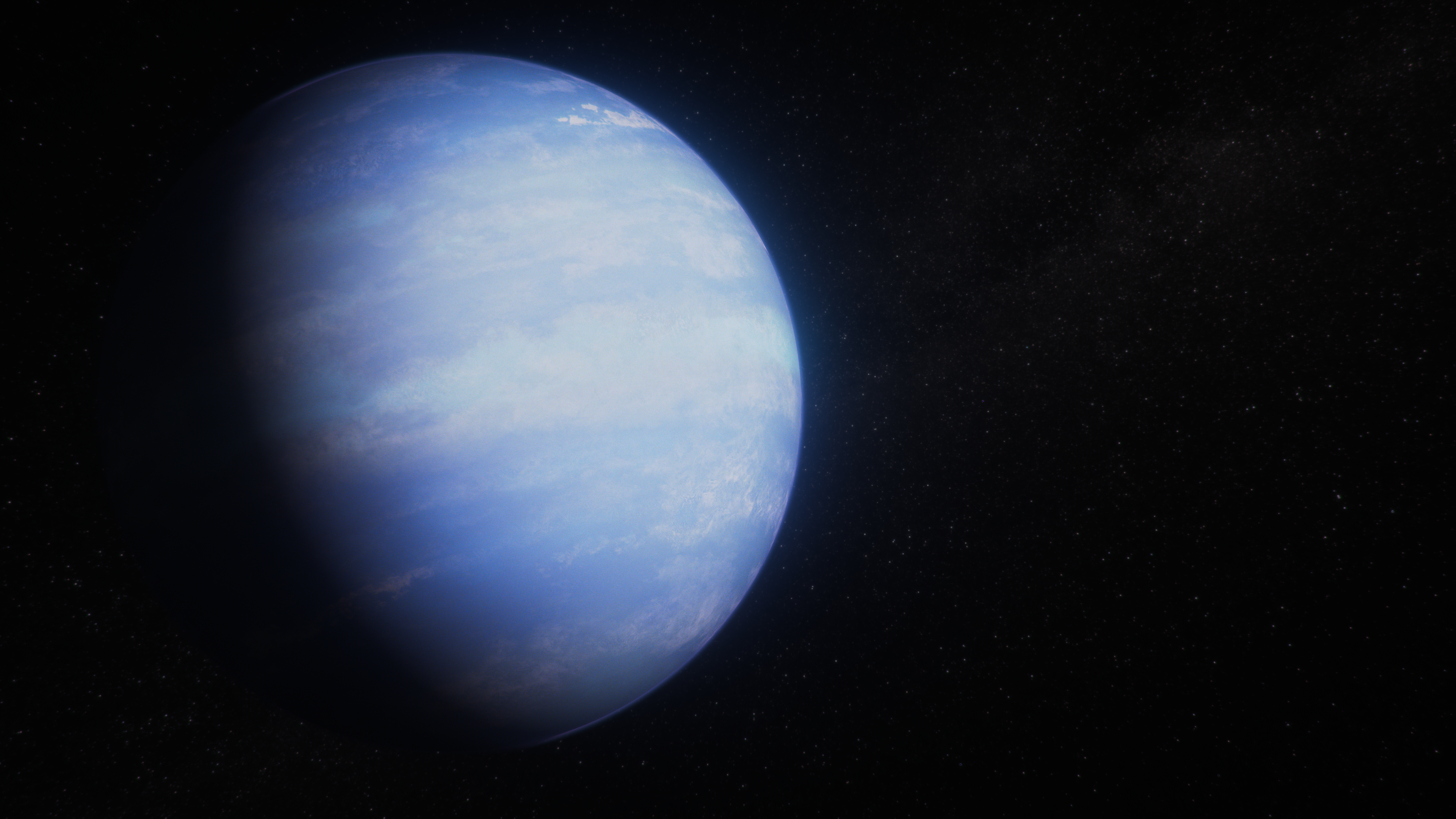
- Artist's impression of exoplanet WASP-107b.

Discovery
- Discovered by: D. R. Anderson et al.
- Discovery date: 2017
- Detection method: WASP-South

Orbital characteristics
- Semi-major axis: 0.0566 ± 0.0017 AU (8,470,000 ± 250,000 km)
- Eccentricity: 0.09 ± 0.02
- Orbital period (sidereal): 5.721487 d
- Star: WASP-107

Physical characteristics
- Mean radius: 0.96±0.03 R_{J}
- Mass: 0.096±0.005 M_{J}
- Temperature: 750 K (477 °C)

Atmosphere
- Composition by volume: water vapor, helium, sulfur dioxide, ammonia, hydrogen sulfide, carbon monoxide, silicate cloud

WASP-107b is a super-Neptune exoplanet that orbits the K-type star WASP-107 which is located around 200 light-years away from Earth in the constellation of Virgo.

Its discovery was announced in 2017 by a team led by D. R. Anderson via the WASP-South.

== Planetary orbit ==
It orbits around WASP-107 at a distance of around 0.05 AU with a eccentricity of 0.09 taking around 5.7 days to complete an orbit around the star. This makes it is about eight times nearer to its star than Mercury is to the Sun. It is in a retrograde orbit, strongly misaligned with the equatorial plane of the parent star. The misalignment angle is equal to 118°^{+38}_{−19}. WASP-107c follows a highly eccentric and inclined orbit with a period of 1088^{+15}_{−16} days.

WASP-107b could not have formed in its current orbit. It likely migrated inward from its birth orbit beyond 1 AU due to interaction with the heavier planet WASP-107c.

== Physical characteristics ==
WASP-107b is a super-Neptunian ice giant exoplanet that is roughly the size of Jupiter but less than one-tenth of Jupiter's mass, making it one of known lowest density-exoplanets. This is unusual provided that the mean temperature of its upper atmosphere is only 500 °C (932 °F), much lower than that of similarly inflated exoplanets.

Its highly extended and low density atmosphere coupled with transiting a moderately bright orange dwarf star makes it an attractive target for atmospheric characterization via transmission spectroscopy.

=== Atmosphere ===
Helium was discovered in the planet's atmosphere in 2018, making it the first time helium was discovered on an exoplanet. A follow-up observation with Keck in 2020 showed that the helium absorption extends beyond transit-egress. Extreme ultraviolet radiation from the host star is gradually whittling down the planet's atmosphere, forming a comet-like tail 7 times as long as the radius of the planet. In November 2023, scientists discovered that its atmosphere contains water (H_{2}O) vapour and sulfur dioxide (SO_{2}). The clouds on this planet are made up of silicates. The data, along with the unexpectedly low abundance of methane (CH_{4}), suggests a hotter interior and a more massive core than previously estimated. Tidal heating, caused by the planet's slightly elliptical orbit, is believed to be the source of the extra internal heat.

In September 2024 it was revealed that there is an east-west asymmetry in the atmospheric properties (e.g, climate, cloud structure) of WASP-107b, which previously had not been expected for planet of its type.

== See also ==
- Lists of exoplanets
- List of largest exoplanets
- List of nearest exoplanets
