= 2MASS J18082002−5104378 =

One of the oldest stars in the universe

Observation data Epoch J2000 Equinox ICRS
- Constellation: Ara
- Right ascension: 18^{h} 08^{m} 20.02^{s}
- Declination: −51° 04′ 37.8″
- Apparent magnitude (V): 11.9

Characteristics
- Evolutionary stage: Subgiant / Red dwarf

Astrometry
Proper motion (μ)	RA: −5.672 mas/yr Dec.: −12.643 mas/yr
Parallax (π)	1.6775±0.0397 mas
Distance	1,950 ly (600 pc)

Details

A
Mass	0.7599 ± 0.0001 M_{☉}
Radius	2.44 R_{☉}
Luminosity	5.311 L_{☉}
Surface gravity (log g)	3.0 cgs
Temperature	5,440 ± 100 K
Metallicity [Fe/H]	-4.1 dex
Age	13.535±0.002 Gyr

B
Mass	0.14+0.06 −0.01 M_{☉}
Age	13.535±0.002 Gyr

Other designations
- Gaia DR2 6702907209758894848

Database references
SIMBAD	data

2MASS J18082002−5104378 (abbreviated J1808−5104) is an ultra metal-poor (UMP) binary star system, in the constellation Ara, about 1,950 ly (600 pc) from Earth, and is a single-lined spectroscopic binary (SB1). Estimated to be about 13.53 billion years old, it is one of the oldest stars known, and possibly one of the first stars in our universe — one made almost entirely of materials released from the Big Bang. A tiny unseen companion, a low-mass UMP star, is particularly unusual.

== System ==
J1808−5104 is an ultra metal-poor (UMP) star, one that has a logarithmic metallicity [Fe/H] less than −4, or 1/ 10,000 th of the levels in the Sun. It is a single-lined spectroscopic binary, with radial velocity variations in its spectral absorption lines interpreted as orbital motion of the visible star. The companion is invisible, but inferred from the orbit.

J1808−5104 is the brightest UMP star, as a binary system, known, and is part of the "thin disk" of the Milky Way, the part of the galaxy in which the Sun is located, but unusual for such a metal-poor and old star. At 13.53 Gyr, the star is the oldest known thin-disk star, and several billion years older than most estimates for the age of the Milky Way's thin disk. Despite its age and low metallicity, 2MASS J18082002−5104378 is still too metal-rich to be considered a population III star.

=== Primary star ===
The primary component of the binary star system, 2MASS J18082002−5104378 A, is a subgiant, cooler than the Sun, but larger and more luminous.

=== Secondary star ===
The secondary unseen companion, 2MASS J18082002−5104378 B, thought to be a red dwarf, has an orbital period P = 34.757+0.010
−0.010 days and a mass of 0.14 M_{☉}. It is the first low-mass UMP star to be discovered, and one of the oldest stars in the universe, about 13.53 billion years old. It is possibly one of the first stars, a star made almost entirely of materials released from the Big Bang.
