= Odilorhabdin =

Odilorhabdins are a class of natural antibacterial agents produced by the bacterium Xenorhabdus nematophila. Odilorhabdins act against both Gram-positive and Gram-negative pathogens, and were shown to eliminate infections in mouse models.

== Mechanism of action ==
Odilorhabdins interfere with the pathogen's protein synthesis and are ribosome-targeting. They bind to the small ribosomal subunit at a site not exploited by previous antibiotics and induce miscoding and premature stop codon bypass. Odilorhabdins were shown to act particularly against carbapenem-resistant members of bacteria family Enterobacteriaceae, having potential to kill pathogens with antimicrobial resistance.

== Discovery ==
The discovery of odilorhabdins was announced in 2013 and formally described in 2018 by the researchers of the University of Illinois at Chicago and Nosopharm. To identify the antibiotic, the Nosopharm researchers tested 80 cultured bacterial strains for antimicrobial properties and then isolated the active compounds.
