= Carbon monitoring =

Tracking how much carbon dioxide or methane is produced

Carbon monitoring as part of greenhouse gas monitoring is the tracking of how much carbon dioxide or methane is produced by a particular activity at a particular time. For example, it may refer to tracking methane emissions from agriculture, or carbon dioxide emissions from land use changes, such as deforestation, or from burning fossil fuels, whether in a power plant, automobile, or other device. Because carbon dioxide is the greenhouse gas emitted in the largest quantities, and methane is an even more potent greenhouse gas, monitoring carbon emissions is widely seen as crucial to any effort to reduce emissions and thereby slow climate change.

Monitoring carbon emissions is key to the cap-and-trade program currently being used in Europe, as well as the one in California, and will be necessary for any such program in the future, like the Paris Agreement. The lack of reliable sources of consistent data on carbon emissions is a significant barrier to efforts to reduce emissions.

== Data sources ==
Sources of such emissions data include:

Carbon Monitoring for Action (CARMA) – An online database provided by the Center for Global Development, that includes plant-level emissions for more than 50,000 power plants and 4,000 power companies around the world, as well as the total emissions from power generation of countries, provinces (or states), and localities. Carbon emissions from power generation account for about 25 percent of global CO_{2} emissions.

ETSWAP – An emissions monitoring and reporting system currently in use in the UK and Ireland, which enables relevant organizations to monitor, verify and report carbon emissions, as is required by the EU ETS (European Union Emissions Trading Scheme).

FMS – A system used in Germany to record and calculate annual emission reports for plant operators subject to the EU ETS.

=== Remaining global carbon budget ===
Carbon emissions are also monitored on a global scale (with data for countries, sectors, companies, activities, etc).

Historical (unrestrained) carbon budget: Cumulative contributions to the global carbon budget since 1850 illustrate how source and sink components have been out of balance, causing an approximately 50% rise in atmospheric CO_{2}.

Fossil CO_{2} emissions: global; territorial; by fuel type (incl cement); per capita

Several organisations provide annual updates to the remaining carbon budget, including the Global Carbon Project, the Mercator Research Institute on Global Commons and Climate Change (MCC) and the CONSTRAIN project. In March 2022, before formal publication of the "Global Carbon Budget 2021" preprint, scientists reported, based on Carbon Monitor (CM) data, that after COVID-19-pandemic-caused record-level declines in 2020, global CO_{2} emissions rebounded sharply by 4.8% in 2021, indicating that at the current trajectory, the carbon budget for a 2/3 likelihood for limiting warming to 1.5 °C would be used up within 9.5 years.

In April 2022, the now reviewed and officially published The Global Carbon Budget 2021 concluded that fossil CO_{2} emissions rebounded from pandemic levels by around +4.8% relative to 2020 emissions – returning to 2019 levels.

It identifies three major issues for improving reliable accuracy of monitoring, shows that China and India surpassed 2019 levels (by 5.7% and 3.2%) while the EU and the US stayed beneath 2019 levels (by 5.3% and 4.5%), quantifies various changes and trends, for the first time provides models' estimates that are linked to the official country GHG inventories reporting, and suggests that the remaining carbon budget at 1. Jan 2022 for a 50% likelihood to limit global warming to 1.5 °C (albeit a temporary exceedence is to be expected) is 120 GtC (420 GtCO_{2}) – or 11 years of 2021 emissions levels.

This does not mean that likely 11 years remain to cut emissions but that if emissions stayed the same, instead of increasing like in 2021, 11 years of constant GHG emissions would be left in the hypothetical scenario that all emissions suddenly ceased in the 12th year. (The 50% likelihood may be describable as a kind of minimum plausible deniability requirement as lower likelihoods would make the 1.5 °C goal "unlikely".) Moreover, other trackers show (or highlight) different amounts of carbon budget left, such as the MCC, which as of May 2022 shows "7 years 1 month left" and different likelihoods have different carbon budgets: a 83% likelihood would mean 6.6 ±0.1 years left (ending in 2028) according to CM data.

In October 2023 a group of researchers updated the carbon budget including the CO_{2} emitted at 2020-2022 and new findings about the role of reduced presence of polluting particles in the atmosphere. They found we can emit 250 GtCO_{2} or 6 years of emissions at current level starting from January 2023, for having a 50% chance to stay below 1.5 degrees. For reaching this target humanity will need to zero CO_{2} emissions by the year 2034. To have a 50% chance of staying below 2 degrees humanity can emit 1220 GtCO_{2} or 30 years of emissions at current level.

== In the United States ==
Almost all climate change regulations in the US have stipulations to reduce carbon dioxide and methane emissions by economic sector, so being able to accurately monitor and assess these emissions is crucial to being able to assess compliance with these regulations. Emissions estimates at the national level have been shown to be fairly accurate, but at the state level there is still much uncertainty. As part of the Paris Agreement, the US pledged to "decrease its GHG emissions by 26–28 % relative to 2005 levels by 2025 as part of the Paris Agreement negotiated at COP21. To comply with these regulations, it is necessary to quantify emissions from specific source sectors. A source sector is a sector of the economy that emits a particular greenhouse gas, i.e. methane emissions from the oil and gas industry, which the US has pledged to decrease by 40–45 % relative to 2012 levels by 2025 as a more specific action towards achieving its Paris Agreement contribution.

Currently, most governments, including the US government, estimate carbon emissions with a "bottom-up" approach, using emission factors which give the rate of carbon emissions per unit of a certain activity, and data on how much of that activity has taken place. For example an emission factor can be determined for the amount of carbon dioxide emitted per gallon of gasoline burned, and this can be combined with data on gasoline sales to get an estimate of carbon emissions from light duty vehicles. Other examples include determining the number of cows in various locations, or the mass of coal burned at power plants, and combining these data with the appropriate emissions factors to estimate methane or carbon dioxide emissions. Sometimes "top-down" methods are used to monitor carbon emissions. These involve measuring the concentration of a greenhouse gas in the atmosphere and using these measurements to determine the distribution of emissions which caused the resulting concentrations.

Accounting by sector can be complicated when there is a chance of double counting. For example, when coal is gasified to produce synthetic natural gas, which is then mixed with natural gas and burned at a natural gas powered power plant, if accounted for as part of the natural gas sector, this activity must be subtracted from the coal sector and added to the natural gas sector in order to be properly accounted for.

=== NASA Carbon Monitoring System (CMS) ===
NASA Carbon Monitoring System (CMS) is a climate research program created by a congressional order in 2010 that provides grants of about $500,000 a year for climate research that measure carbon dioxide and methane emissions. Using instruments in satellites and airplanes CMS funded research projects provide data to the United States and other countries that help track progress of individual nations regarding their Paris climate emission cuts agreements. For example, CMS projects measured carbon emissions from deforestation and forest degradation. CMS "stitch[ed] together observations of sources and sinks into high-resolution models of the planet's flows of carbon." The 2019 federal budget specifically assured funding for CMS, after the Trump administration proposed to end funding.

== In the European Union ==
As part of the European Union Emission Trading Scheme (EU-ETS), carbon monitoring is necessary in order to ensure compliance with the cap-and-trade program. This carbon monitoring program has three main components: atmospheric carbon dioxide measurements, bottom-up carbon dioxide emissions maps, and an operational data-assimilation system to synthesize the information from the first two components.

The top-down, atmospheric measurement approach involves satellite data and in-situ measurements of carbon dioxide concentrations, as well as atmospheric models that model atmospheric transport of carbon dioxide. These have limited ability to determine carbon dioxide emissions at highly resolved spatial scales and can typically not represent finer scales than a 1 km grid. The models also must resolve the fluxes of carbon dioxide from anthropogenic sources like fossil fuel burning, and from natural interactions like terrestrial ecosystems and the ocean. Due to the complexities and limitations of the top-down approach, the EU combines this method with a bottom-up approach.

The current bottom-up data are based on information that is self-reported by emitters in the trading scheme. However, the EU is trying to improve this information source and has proposed plans for improved bottom-up emissions maps, which will have greatly improved spatial resolution and near real-time updates.

An operational data system to combine the information gathered from the two aforementioned sources is also planned. The EU hopes that by the 2030s, this will be operational and enable a highly sophisticated carbon monitoring program across the European Union.

== Satellites ==
Satellites can be used to monitor carbon dioxide concentrations from orbit. NASA currently operates a satellite named the Orbiting Carbon Observatory-2 (OCO-2), and Japan operates their own satellite, the Greenhouse Gases Observing Satellite (GOSAT). These satellites can provide valuable information to fill in data gaps from emission inventories. The OCO-2 measured a strong flux of carbon dioxide over the Middle East, which had not been represented in emissions inventories, indicating that important sources were being neglected in bottom-up estimates of emissions. These satellites currently have errors of about 0.5% in their measurements, but the American and Japanese teams hope to reduce the errors to 0.25%. China recently launched their own satellite to monitor greenhouse gas concentrations on Earth, the TanSat, in December 2016. It currently has a three-year mission planned and will take readings of carbon dioxide concentrations every 16 days.

== See also ==
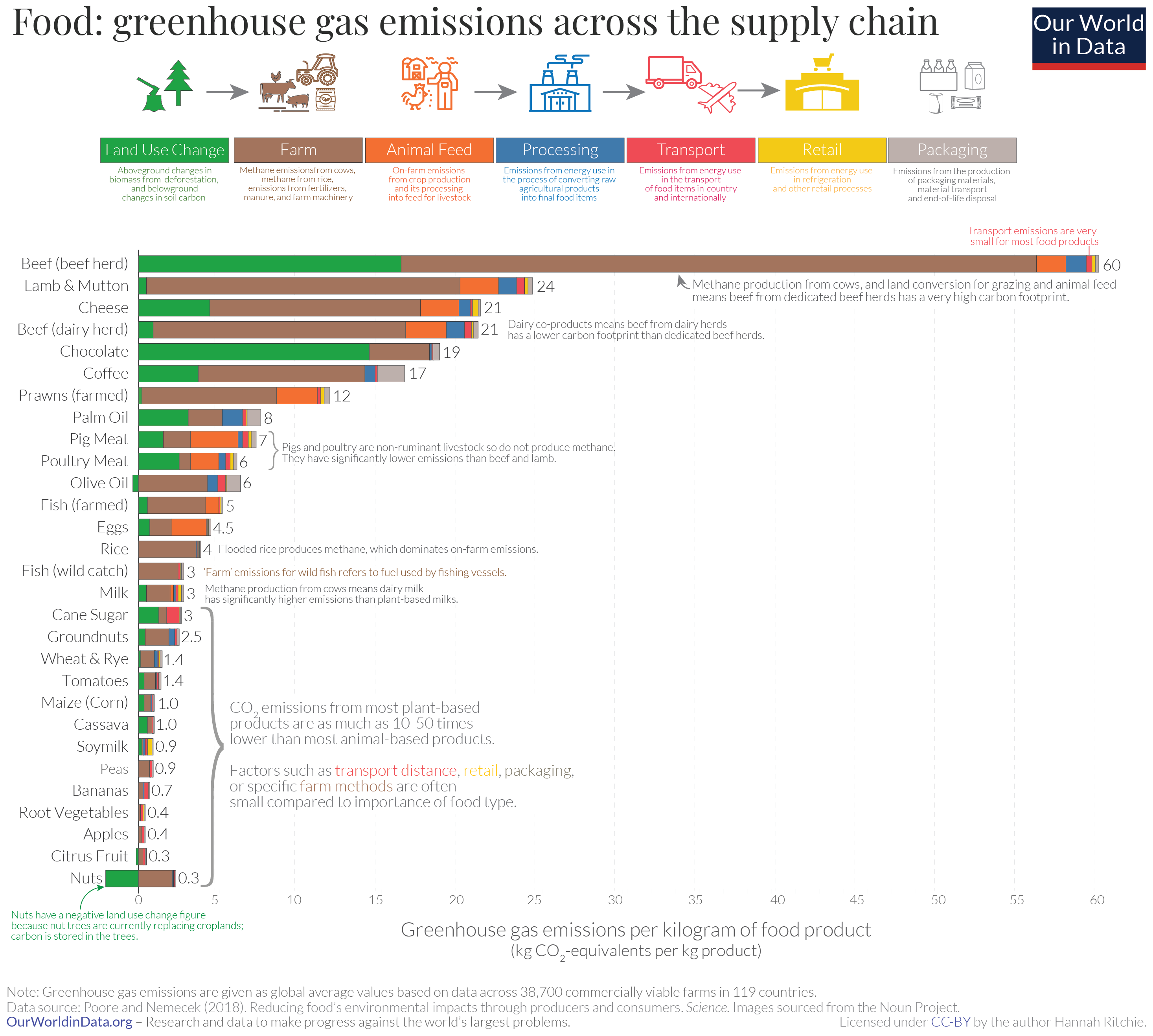
Life-cycle assessment of GHG emissions for foods

- Top contributors to greenhouse gas emissions
- List of countries by carbon dioxide emissions
- Supply chain management
