= Total Carbon Column Observing Network =

Global network monitoring greenhouse gases

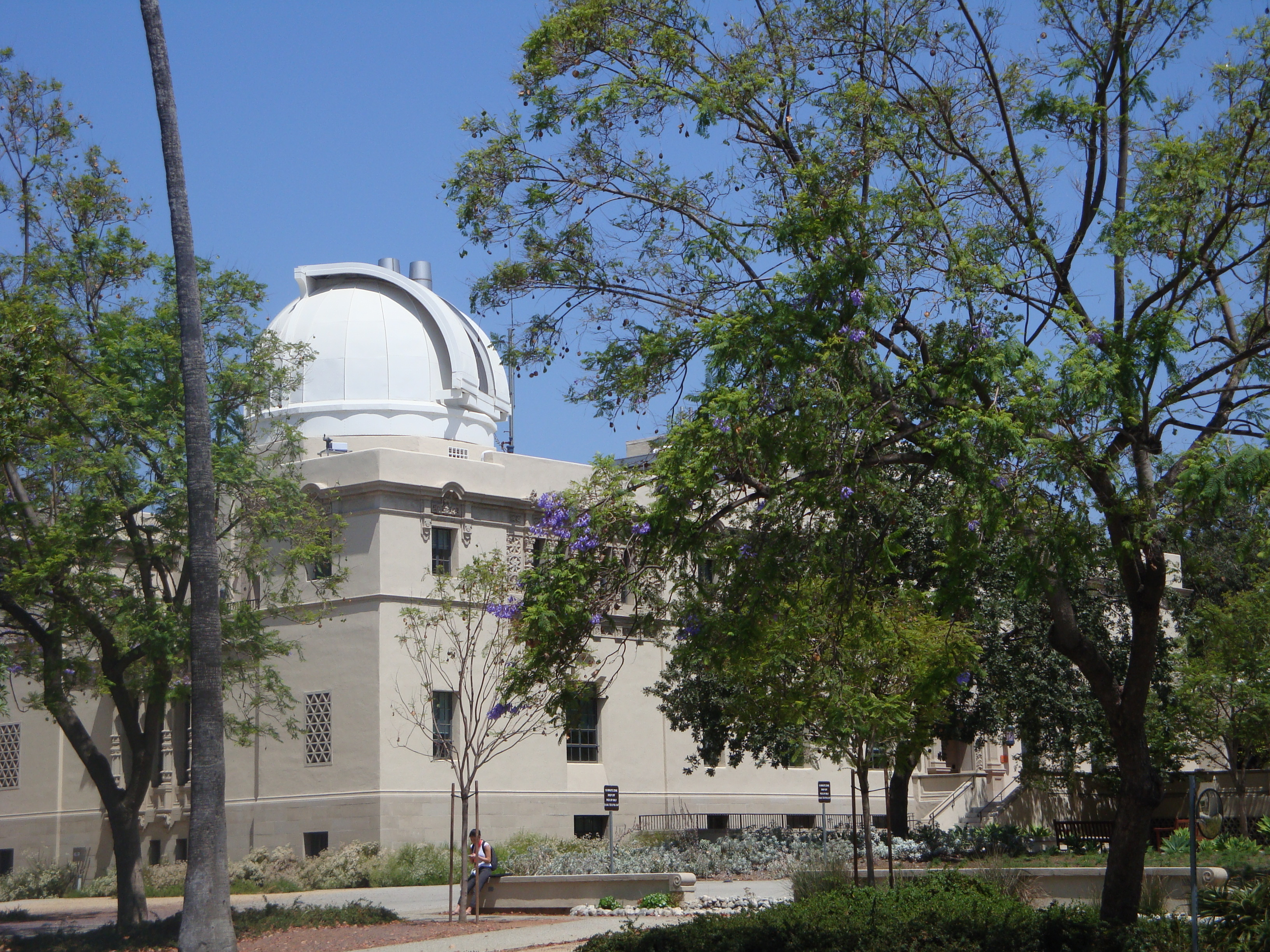
Caltech

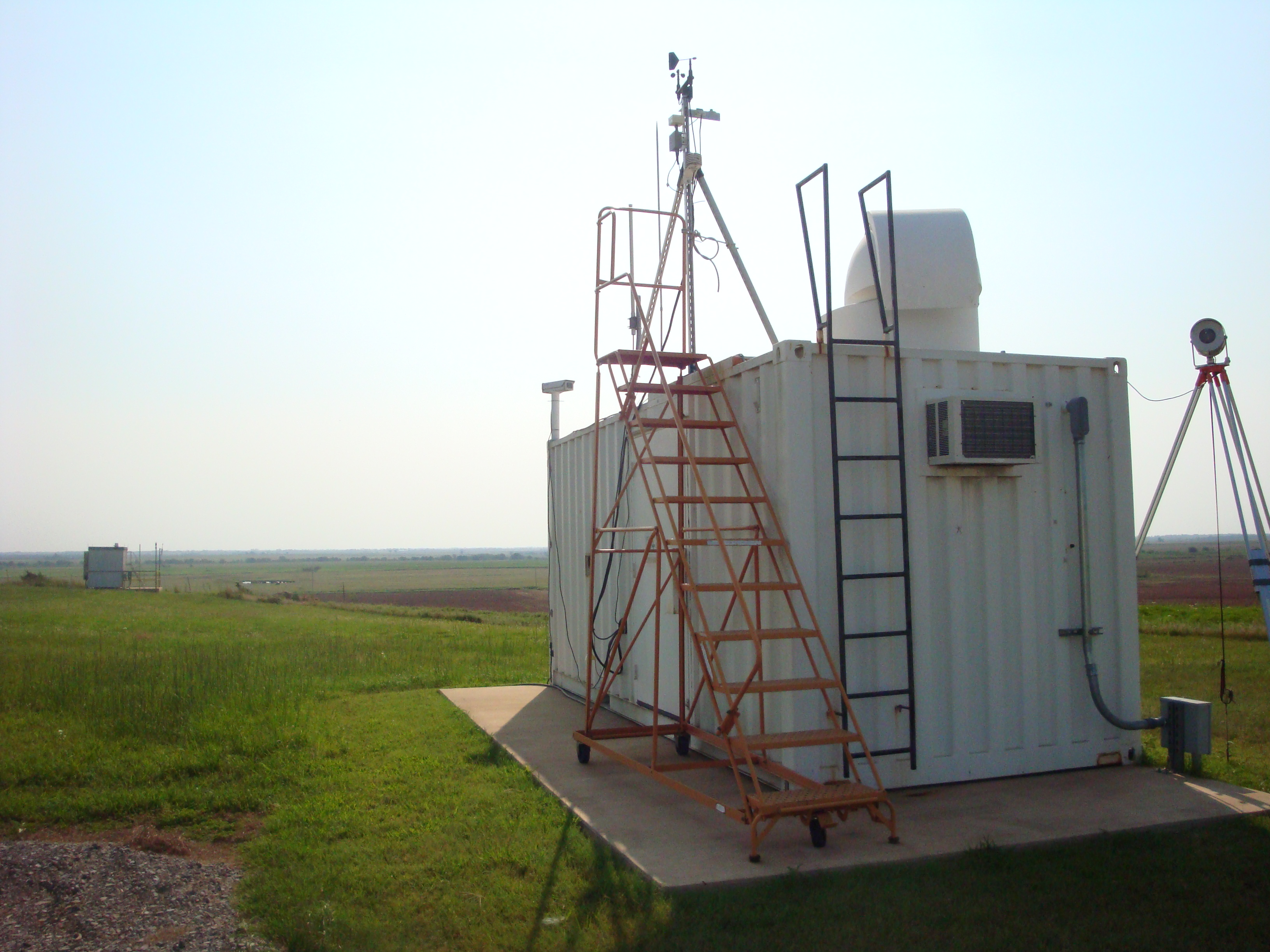
Lamont

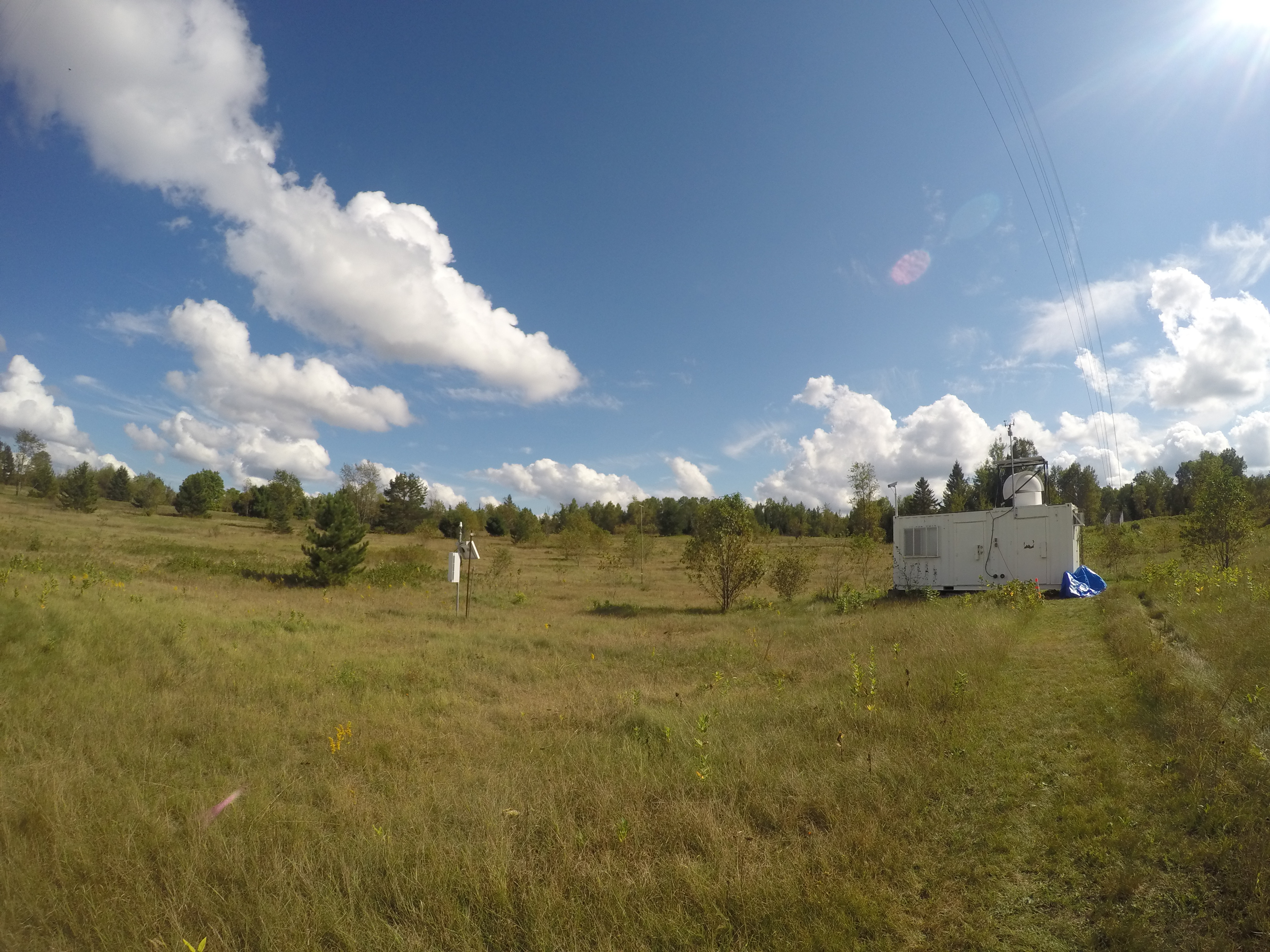
Park Falls
- Abbreviation: TCCON
- Formation: 26 May 2004; 22 years ago
- Type: International collaborative network
- Products: column GHG measurements
- Methods: near-IR solar spectroscopy
- Chair: Debra Wunch (2020-23)
- Co-chair (Europe / Africa): Thorsten Warneke (2020-23)
- Co-chair (W. Pacific / Asia): Nicholas Deutscher (2020-23)

The Total Carbon Column Observing Network (TCCON) is a global network of Fourier transform instruments that measure the amount of carbon dioxide (CO_{2}), methane (CH_{4}), carbon monoxide (CO), nitrous oxide (N_{2}O) and other trace gases in the Earth's atmosphere. The TCCON (/ˈtiːkɒn/ TEE-kon) began in 2004 with the installation of the first instrument in Park Falls, Wisconsin, USA, and has since grown to 30 sites as of July 2023.

The TCCON is designed to investigate several things, including the flow (or flux) of carbon between the atmosphere, land, and ocean (the so-called carbon budget or carbon cycle). This is achieved by measuring the atmospheric mass of carbon (the airborne fraction). The TCCON measurements have improved the scientific community's understanding of the carbon cycle, and urban greenhouse gas emissions.

The TCCON supports several satellite instruments by providing an independent measurement to compare (or validate) the satellite measurements of the atmosphere over the TCCON site locations. The TCCON provides the primary measurement validation dataset for the Orbiting Carbon Observatory (OCO-2) mission, and has been used to validate other space-based measurements of carbon dioxide.

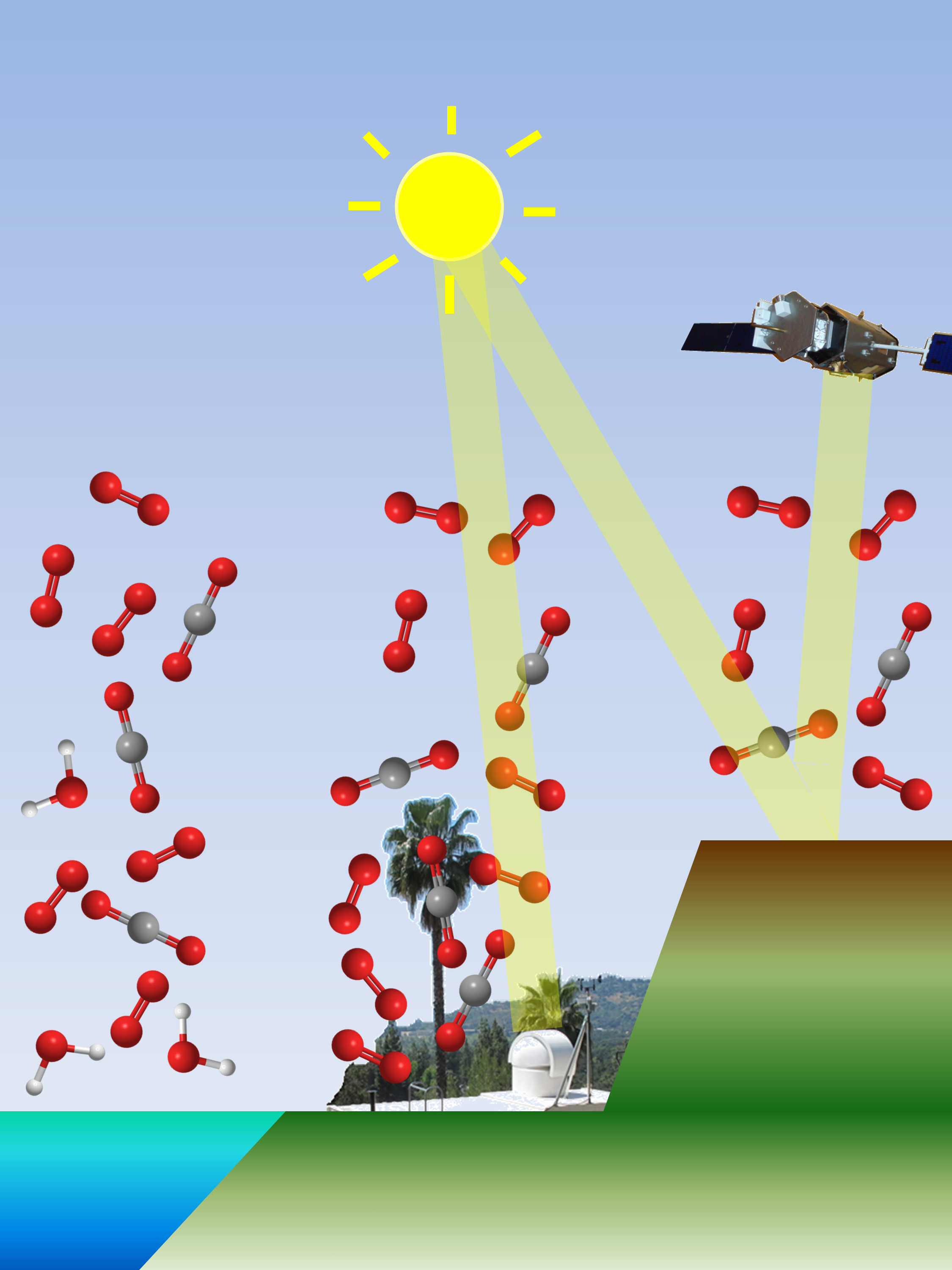
Cartoon oversimplification of column gas measurements by TCCON & satellite. O_{2} & the gas of interest are measured & ratioed for a column averaged amount.

== History ==
The TCCON was established partly because of modeling errors between mixing efficiency between the PBL and the free troposphere. Because TCCON measurements are of the entire column of atmosphere above a site (PBL and free troposphere are simultaneously measured) the measurements are an improvement over the traditional in situ near surface measurements in this regard. TCCON has improved the CO_{2} mass gradient measurements between the northern and southern hemispheres.

The first annual TCCON meeting was in San Francisco, California in 2005. Every year a meeting is held in a location that rotates between North America, the Western Pacific, and Europe hosted by a participating institution. In 2015 the meeting was held at the University of Toronto.

== Measurement technique ==
The main instrument at each TCCON site is a Bruker IFS 125HR (HR for high resolution, ~0.02 cm^{−1}) or occasionally 120HR Fourier transform spectrometer. Sunlight is directed into the spectrometer by solar tracking mirrors and other optics. The spectrometers measure the absorption of direct sunlight by atmospheric trace gases primarily in the near infrared region. This remote sensing technique produces a precise and accurate measurement of the total column abundance of the trace gas. The TCCON measures in the near infrared region because the near infrared region contains absorption bands for O_{2}, CO_{2}, CH_{4}, CO, and N_{2}O which are the gases of interest that are temperature independent and not overly saturated.

== Technical standards ==
New sites are admitted into the network when site investigators demonstrate required hardware, and data processing ability. To be admitted into the network the instruments in the site have to be extremely accurate to meet the demands of carbon cycle science. To do this the network relies on Bruker IFS 125HR spectrometers located across the world. It captures near infrared solar absorption spectra and allows scientists to see CO_{2} and CH_{4} data across the entire atmospheric column. The high precision of the instruments helped scientists determine that the seasonal exchange was 25% larger than other models predicted. This is because the TCCONs vertical approach makes the data resilient to local turbulence and other errors that skew surface level sensor data.

The main limitation to this technique is that measurements can not be recorded when it is not sunny (i.e. there are no measurements available at nighttime or when there is heavy cloud cover).There are also high operating costs for all of the instruments due to their complexity, which leads to a sparse distribution of sites, with many sites in some areas and very few in others. Leading to some holes in data where sites are not located.

Uniformity is maintained across the network by using the same FTS model and the same retrieval software. GGG is the software of the TCCON. It includes the I2S (interferogram to spectrum) FFT, and GFIT spectral fitting subroutines. GFIT is also the fitting algorithm that was used for ATMOS which flew on the Space Shuttle, and is used for spectral fitting of spectra obtained by a balloon borne spectrometer.

== Data products ==
In 2024, The TCCON added a new software called the GGG2020. This software improved ground data and helped modern satellite missions like OCO-3 and GOSAT-2. The update improved interferogram-to-spectrum conversion, improved a priori profiles, and updated spectroscopy. The GGG2020 now detects nonlinearity and can quickly discard data based on the maximum and minimum values of their signal. The GGG2020 now supports portable instruments like the EM27/SUN which allows scientists to monitor greenhouse gases in urban centers and remote frontiers where the traditional stations cannot.

== Participating sites and institutions ==
Current TCCON sites are located in the United States, China, Canada, Germany, Poland, France, Japan, Australia, New Zealand, South Korea, Réunion, and Ascension Island. A former site was in Brazil. Sites can change when an instrument needs to be moved to a new location.

TCCON members collaborate from a variety of different institutions. In North America some of these include Caltech, JPL, Los Alamos National Laboratory, NASA Ames, and the University of Toronto. In Europe some of these include Karlsruhe Institute of Technology, Max Planck Institute for Biogeochemistry, University of Bremen, Agencia Estatal de Meteorología, Royal Belgian Institute for Space Aeronomy, Finnish Meteorological Institute, and Pierre and Marie Curie University. In the western Pacific some of these include University of Wollongong, National Institute of Water and Atmospheric Research, National Institute for Environmental Studies, JAXA, and National Institute of Meteorological Research of the Republic of Korea.

=== Map ===
TCCON sites around the globe, as of October 2025. green = active and public data available, cyan = active and no public data yet, white= former and public data, yellow = potential future site

== Highlights of data use ==
Data from each site is processed by the investigators that head that particular site. Atmospheric abundances of gases are uploaded and saved in uniform formats and data are hosted at Caltech with the Caltech Library and are available from http://tccondata.org. Data are made publicly available provided the data license is followed.

Data have been used for a variety of analyses. Some of these include

- Emission estimates of methane and carbon monoxide were made for the South Coast Air Basin containing Los Angeles using TCCON measurements and the CARB inventory.
- Characterization of biosphere fluxes in the Southern Hemisphere
- Evaluation of the seasonal exchange of CO_{2} between the biosphere and the atmosphere
- Numerous satellite validation projects
- Validation projects involving comparison of CO_{2} and CH_{4} measured by TCCON with that measured by lower-resolution instruments
- Covariation between surface temperature and CO_{2} in boreal regions
- Distinguishing between which of two power plants (~2000 MW each) plumes of polluted air came from in conjunction with a Pandora NO_{2} spectrometer

== Satellite support ==
The satellite missions supported by the TCCON include the Greenhouse Gases Observing Satellite (GOSAT), SCIAMACHY, and the Orbiting Carbon Observatory-2 (OCO-2).

== See also ==
- The TCCON home page: https://tccon-wiki.caltech.edu
- Orbiting Carbon Observatory 2
- Greenhouse Gases Observing Satellite
- Founding member Paul Wennberg
