= Global Observing Satellite for Greenhouse gases and Water cycle =

Japanese Earth observation satellite

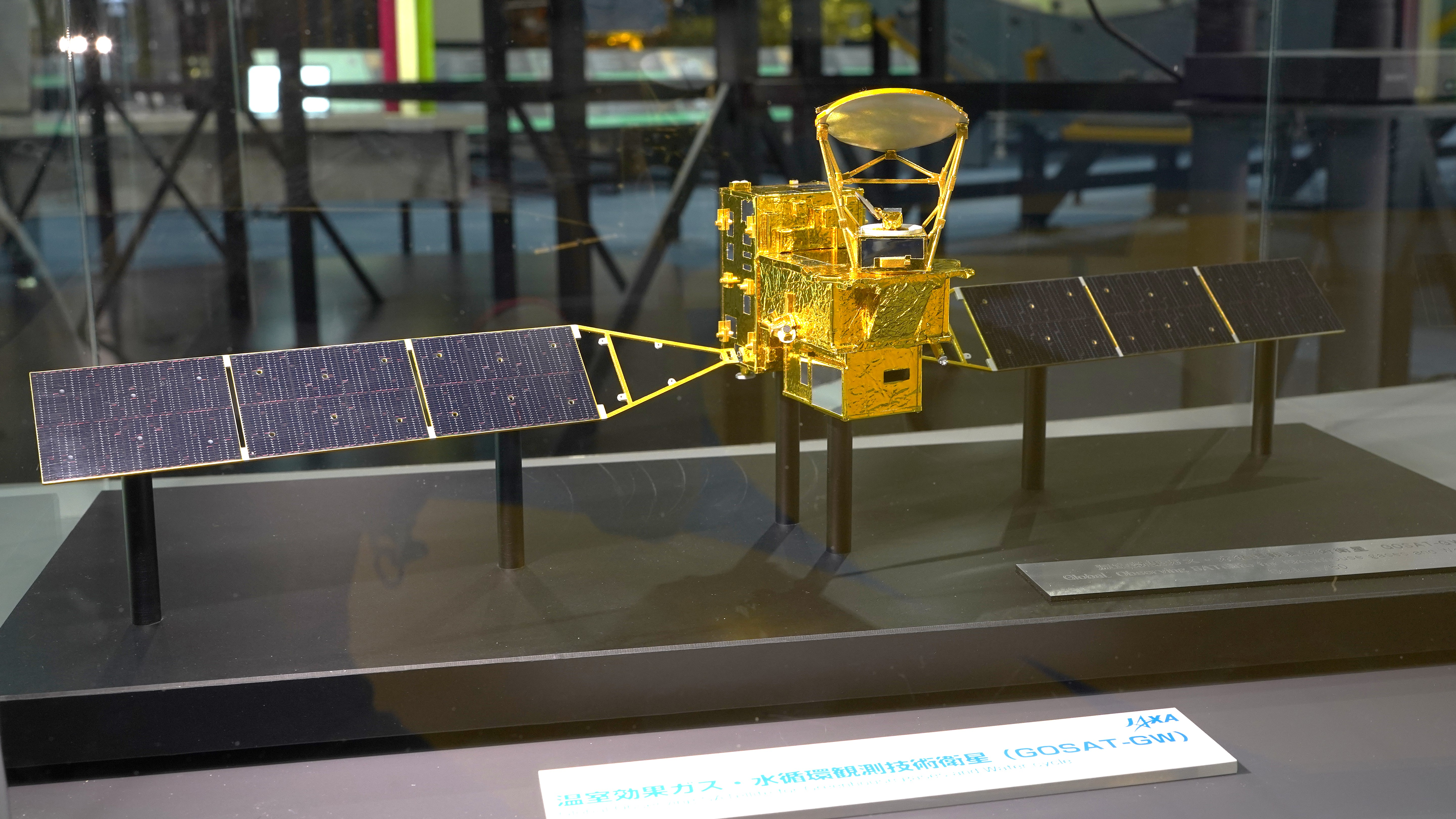
- Scale model of GOSAT-GW at Tsukuba Space Center Space Dome
- Names: Ibuki GW
- Mission type: Environmental
- Operator: JAXA
- Website: www.satnavi.jaxa.jp/files/project/gosat-gw/en/
- Mission duration: 7 years (planned)

Spacecraft properties
- Manufacturer: Mitsubishi Electric
- Power: 5.3 kilowatts

Start of mission
- Launch date: 28 June 2025; 16:33 UTC
- Rocket: H-IIA-202 F50
- Launch site: Tanegashima, LA-Y1
- Contractor: Mitsubishi Heavy Industries

Orbital parameters
- Reference system: Geocentric
- Regime: Low Earth

Instruments
- AMSR3; TANSO-3

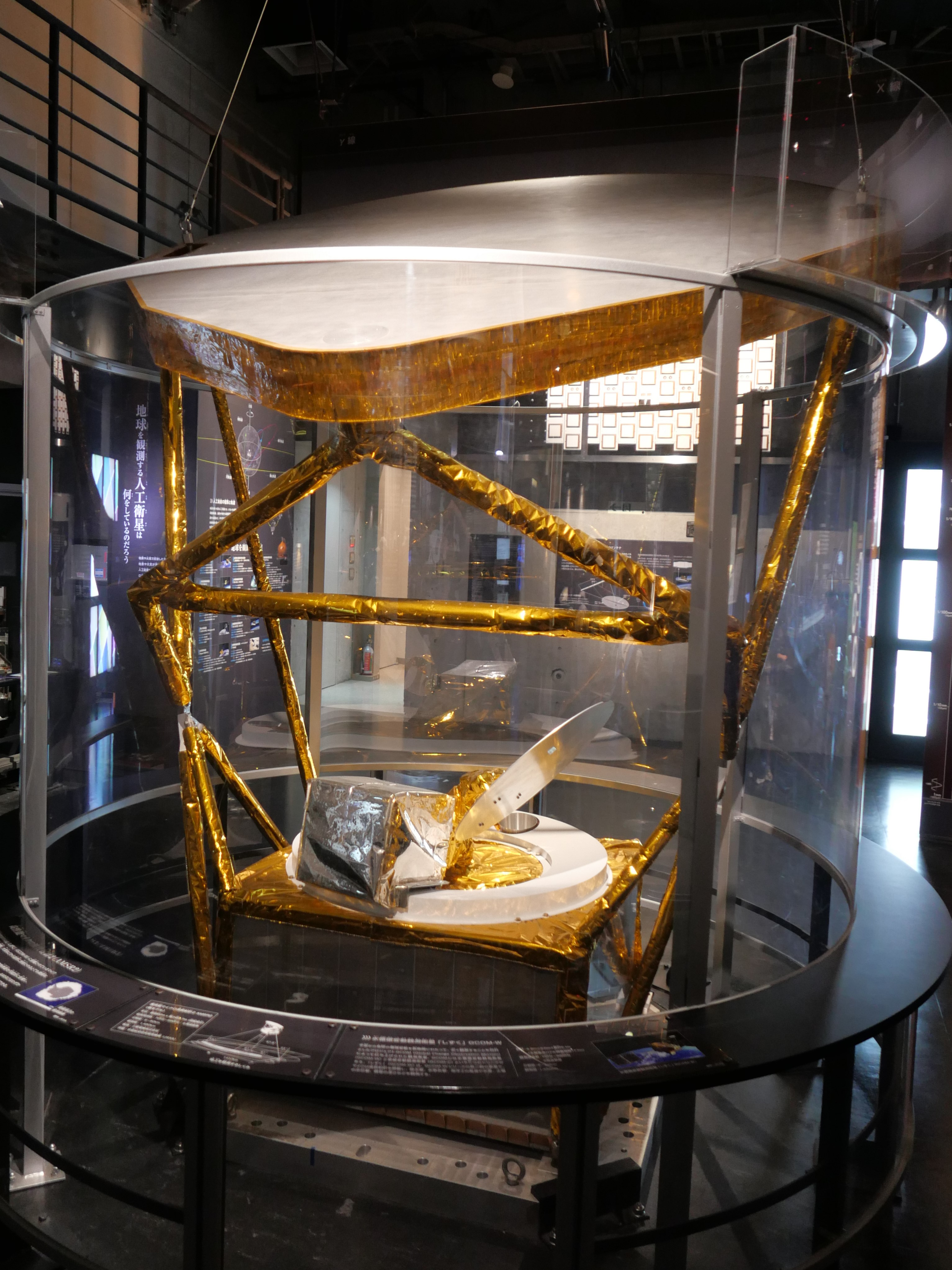
AMSR2 Instrument, predecessor to AMSR3 aboard GCOM-W.

Global Observing Satellite for Greenhouse gases and Water cycle (GOSAT-GW), also called Ibuki GW, is a Japanese Earth observation satellite for observing the global water cycle and greenhouse gas monitoring. It is a successor to the GCOM-W and the GOSAT-2 satellites, and it is the third satellite in the GOSAT series. GOSAT-GW was jointly developed by the Japan Aerospace Exploration Agency (JAXA), Ministry of the Environment, and the National Institute for Environmental Studies (NIES). Operated by JAXA, the mission focuses on monitoring the average global concentrations of greenhouse gases, confirming greenhouse gas emissions inventories, and locating large sources of GHGs (greenhouse gases). The satellite is also being used to monitor the global water cycle. The system operates using two onboard instruments: AMSR3 and TANSO-3. These instruments utilize electromagnetic radiation to collect data. GOSAT-GW was launched on 28 June 2025 on JAXA's workhorse H-IIA rocket.

== Mission ==
GOSAT-GW is operating in a sun-synchronous, ascending orbit at an altitude of 666 km with an estimated lifetime of seven years, and the satellite will incorporate a larger range with continuous data collection in 3 day cycles. The greenhouse gases monitored are carbon dioxide (CO_{2}), methane (CH_{4}), and nitrogen dioxide (NO_{2}). The satellite is also able to monitor oxygen (O_{2}) concentration. While NO_{2} is not a major greenhouse gas, it does contribute to the production of ozone in the lower atmosphere.

The objectives of this mission are:

- Record the mean global concentrations of GHGs
- Verify national GHG inventories
- Detect large sources of GHGs

In addition, the satellite will also:

- Collect data on water cycle elements, such as sea surface temperature or sea ice concentration
- Provide up to date metrics for application

== Instruments ==
Unlike its predecessor GCOM-W, GOSAT-GW will not be placed in the A-train satellite constellation orbit. The satellite has two main instruments: the Advanced Microwave Scanning Radiometer 3 (AMSR3) and the Total Anthropogenic and Natural emissions mapping Spectrometer 3 (TANSO-3). AMSR3 is a part of a series of AMSR instruments developed by JAXA, and this instrument is primarily used for monitoring data related to the water cycle. The instrument records the microwaves emitted from objects at specific frequencies to collect data. The AMSR3 has 11 frequency channels, with 4 more channels than its predecessors, which allows for more precise data to be collected on elements such as water vapor. The center frequencies and band widths for the new channels can be seen in the table below:

New Frequency Channels on AMSR3
Center Frequency	Band Width	Usage
10.25 GHz	500 MHz	Sea Surface Temperature
165.5 GHz	3200 MHz	Solid Precipitation and Water Vapor
183.31 ± 7 GHz	1700 x 2 MHz	Solid Precipitation and Water Vapor
183.31 ± 3 GHz	1470 x 2 MHz	Solid Precipitation and Water Vapor

TANSO-3, similar to AMSR3, is a part of the TANSO series of instruments and is used to monitor GHGs. Unlike AMSR3, this uses spectroscopy within wavelengths close to the visible light range. The instrument's collection range can also be shortened for precision, allowing for a wide swath and a focus mode. In the wide swath mode, the TANSO-3 records data across a space approximately 900 km wide, with a spatial resolution of 100 km^2. The focus mode decreases the width to around 90 km, but it increases the spatial resolution to 9 km^2 or less. For the gases observed, the corresponding wavelengths utilized can be seen below:

=== TANSO-3 System Characteristics ===
Gases monitored on TANSO-3
Gas	Nominal Wavelength	Radiation Type
CO_{2}	1613 nm	Infrared
CH_{4}	1613 nm	Infrared
NO_{2}	450 nm	Visible
O_{2}	766 nm	Visible

== See also ==
- GCOM-W
- GOSAT
- GOSAT-2
- Global Precipitation Measurement
- Orbiting Carbon Observatory 2
- Orbiting Carbon Observatory 3
- Sentinel-3
- Soil Moisture Active Passive
- TanSat
