= Greenhouse gas monitoring =

Measurement of greenhouse gas emissions and levels

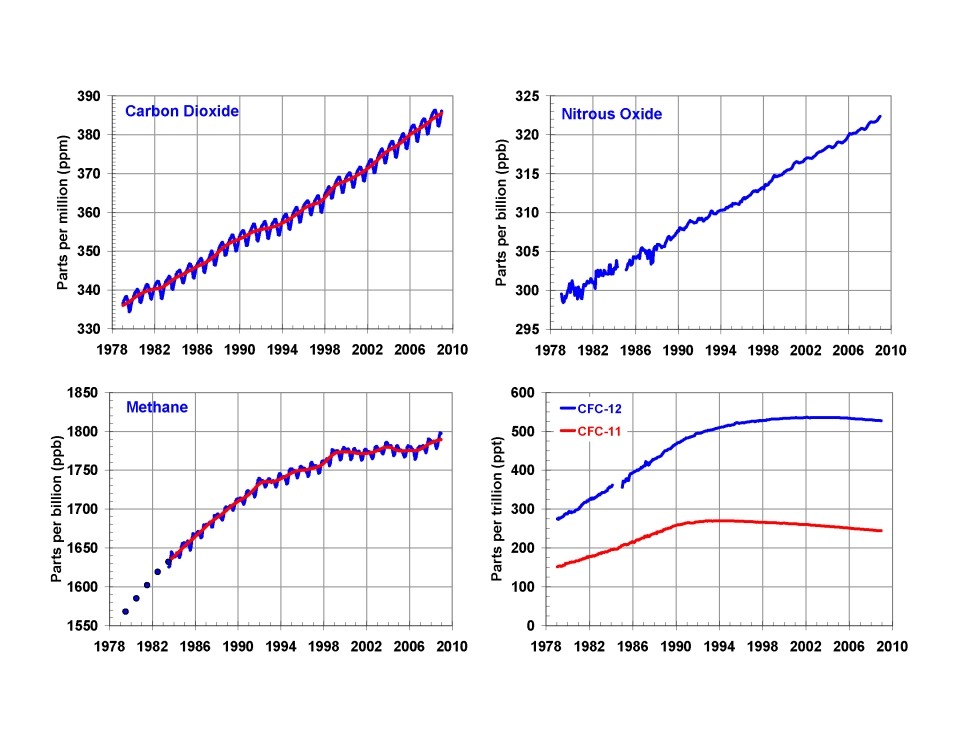
Concentrations in ppm of the major greenhouse gases between 1978 and 2010.

Greenhouse gas monitoring is the direct measurement of greenhouse gas emissions and levels. There are several different methods of measuring carbon dioxide concentrations in the atmosphere, including infrared analyzing and manometry. Methane and nitrous oxide are measured by other instruments. Greenhouse gases are measured from space such as by the Orbiting Carbon Observatory and networks of ground stations such as the Integrated Carbon Observation System.

== Methodology ==
=== Carbon dioxide monitoring ===
==== Manometry ====
Manometry is a key measurement tool for atmospheric carbon dioxide by first measuring the volume, temperature, and pressure of a particular amount of dry air. The air sample is dried by passing it through multiple dry ice traps and then collecting it in a five-liter vessel. The temperature is taken via a thermometer and pressure is calculated using manometry. Then, liquid nitrogen is added, causing the carbon dioxide to condense and become measurable by volume. The ideal gas law is accurate to 0.3% in these pressure conditions.

==== Infrared gas analyzer ====
Infrared analyzers were used at Mauna Loa Observatory and at Scripps Institution of Oceanography between 1958 and 2006. IR analyzers operate by pumping an unknown sample of dry air through a 40 cm long cell. A reference cell contains dry carbon dioxide-free air. A glowing nichrome filament radiates broadband IR radiation which splits into two beams and passes through the gas cells. Carbon dioxide absorbs some of the radiation, allowing more radiation that passes through the reference cell to reach the detector than radiation passing through the sample cell. Data is collected on a strip chart recorder. The concentration of carbon dioxide in the sample is quantified by calibrating with a standard gas of known carbon dioxide content.

==== Titrimetry ====
Titrimetry is another method of measuring atmospheric carbon dioxide that was first used by a Scandinavian group at 15 different ground stations. They began passing a 100.0 mL air sample through a solution of barium hydroxide containing cresolphthalein indicator.

=== Methane gas monitoring ===
==== Differential absorption lidar ====
Range-resolved infrared differential absorption lidar (DIAL) is a means of measuring methane emissions from various sources, including active and closed landfill sites. The DIAL takes vertical scans above methane sources and then spatially separates the scans to accurately measure the methane emissions from individual sources. Measuring methane emissions is a crucial aspect of climate change research, as methane is among the most impactful gaseous hydrocarbon species.

=== Nitrous oxide monitoring ===
==== Atmospheric Chemistry Experiment‐Fourier Transform Spectrometer (ACE-FTS) ====
Nitrous oxide is one of the most prominent anthropogenic ozone-depleting gases in the atmosphere. It is released into the atmosphere primarily through natural sources such as soil and rock, as well as anthropogenic processes like farming. Atmospheric nitrous oxide is also created in the atmosphere as a product of a reaction between nitrogen and electronically excited ozone in the lower thermosphere.

The Atmospheric Chemistry Experiment‐Fourier Transform Spectrometer (ACE-FTS) is a tool used for measuring nitrous oxide concentrations in the upper to lower troposphere. This instrument, which is attached to the Canadian satellite SCISAT, has shown that nitrous oxide is present throughout the entire atmosphere during all seasons, primarily due to energetic particle precipitation. Measurements taken by the instrument show that different reactions create nitrous oxide in the lower thermosphere than in the mid to upper mesosphere. The ACE-FTS is a crucial resource in predicting future ozone depletion in the upper stratosphere by comparing the different ways in which nitrous oxide is released into the atmosphere.

== Satellite monitoring ==
=== Orbiting Carbon Observatory (OCO, OCO-2, OCO-3) ===
The Orbiting Carbon Observatory (OCO) was first launched in February 2009 but was lost due to launch failure. The Satellite was launched again in 2014, this time called the Orbiting Carbon Observatory-2, with an estimated lifespan of about two years. The apparatus uses spectrometers to take 24 carbon dioxide concentration measurements per second of Earth's atmosphere. The measurements taken by OCO-2 can be used for global atmospheric models and will allow scientists to locate carbon sources when its data is paired with wind patterns. The Orbiting Carbon Observatory-3 operates from the International Space Station (ISS).

=== Greenhouse Gases Observing Satellite (GOSat) ===
Satellite observations provides accurate readings of carbon dioxide and methane gas concentrations for short-term and long-term purposes in order to detect changes over time. The goals of this satellite, released in January 2009, is to monitor both carbon dioxide and methane gas in the atmosphere, and to identify their sources. GOSat is a project of three main entities: the Japan Aerospace Exploration Agency (JAXA), the Ministry of the Environment (MOE), and the National Institute for Environmental Studies (NIES).

== Ground stations ==
=== Integrated Carbon Observation System (ICOS) ===
The Integrated Carbon Observation System was established in October 2015 in Helsinki, Finland as a European Research Infrastructure Consortium (ERIC). The main task of ICOS is to establish an Integrated Carbon Observation System Research Infrastructure (ICOS RI) that facilitates research on greenhouse gas emissions, sinks, and their causes. The ICOS ERIC strives to link its own research with other greenhouse gas emissions research to produce coherent data products and to promote education and innovation.

== Integrated Monitoring ==
Among the common methods for measuring emissions are top-down approaches, which rely on atmospheric measurements, and bottom-up methods, which utilize ground-based sensors. Each of these methods has its advantages and limitations. An integrated real-time monitoring system can address these challenges by detecting leaks in near real-time and providing actionable insights for stakeholders to enable effective mitigation strategies. However, implementing such a system presents significant challenges and difficulties that must be carefully considered. A 2023 review by Allen et al. found that, despite advances in remote sensing and ground-based measurement, major gaps remain in the spatial and temporal coverage, methodological consistency, and transparency of greenhouse-gas emissions data, limiting the reliability of emissions reporting and verification of national climate commitments.

== See also ==
- Carbon accounting
- Greenhouse gas inventory
- Infrared gas analyzer
- Mauna Loa Observatory
- Keeling Curve
- Climate Trace Rapid and public GHG monitoring
