= Space-based measurements of carbon dioxide =

Used to help answer questions about Earth's carbon cycle

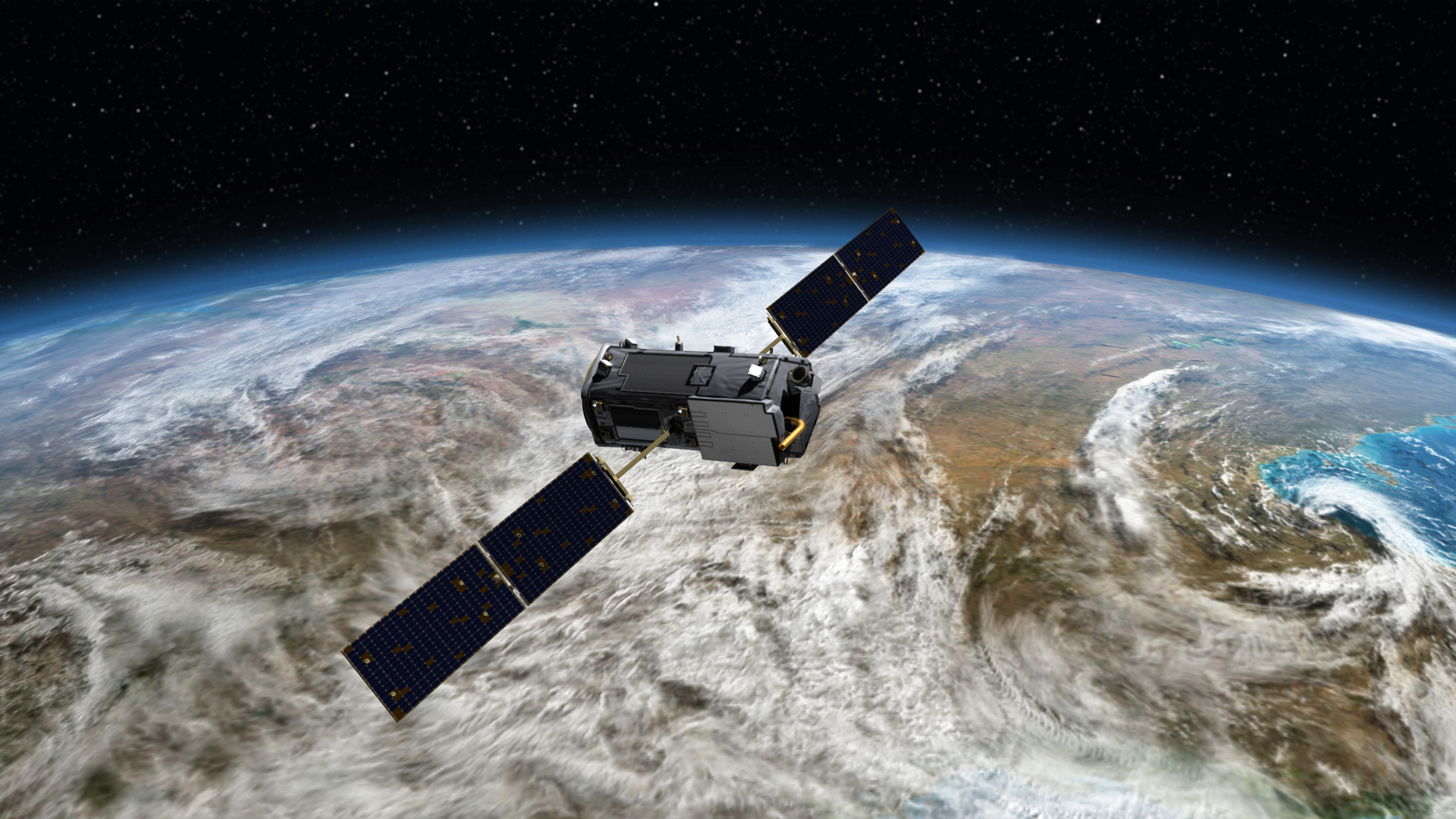
Artist's conception of OCO-2, the second successful high precision (better than 0.3%) CO_{2} observing satellite.

Space-based measurements of carbon dioxide (CO_{2}) are used to help answer questions about Earth's carbon cycle. There are a variety of active and planned instruments for measuring carbon dioxide in Earth's atmosphere from space. The first satellite mission designed to measure CO_{2} was the Interferometric Monitor for Greenhouse Gases (IMG) on board the ADEOS I satellite in 1996. This mission lasted less than a year. Since then, additional space-based measurements have begun, including those from two high-precision (better than 0.3% or 1 ppm) satellites (GOSAT and OCO-2). Different instrument designs may reflect different primary missions.

== Purposes and highlights of findings ==
There are outstanding questions in carbon cycle science that satellite observations can help answer. The Earth system absorbs about half of all anthropogenic CO_{2} emissions. However, it is unclear exactly how this uptake is partitioned to different regions across the globe. It is also uncertain how different regions will behave in terms of CO_{2} flux under a different climate. For example, a forest may increase CO_{2} uptake due to the fertilization or β-effect, or it could release CO_{2} due to increased metabolism by microbes at higher temperatures. These questions are difficult to answer with historically spatially and temporally limited data sets.

Even though satellite observations of CO_{2} are somewhat recent, they have been used for a number of different purposes, some of which are highlighted here:

- Megacity CO_{2} enhancements were observed with the GOSAT satellite and minimum observable space-based changes in emissions were estimated.
- Satellite observations have been used for visualizing how CO_{2} is distributed globally, including studies that have focused on anthropogenic emissions.
- Flux estimates were made of CO_{2} into and out of different regions.
- Correlations were observed between anomalous temperatures and CO_{2} measurements in boreal regions.
- Zonal asymmetric patterns of CO_{2} were used to observe fossil fuel signatures.
- Emission ratios with methane were measured from forest fires.
- CO_{2} emission ratios with carbon monoxide (a marker of incomplete combustion) measured by the MOPITT instrument were analyzed over major urban regions across the globe to measure developing/developed status.
- OCO-2 observations were used to estimate CO_{2} emissions from wildfires in Indonesia in 2015.
- OCO-2 observations were also used to estimate the excess land-ocean flux due to the 2014–16 El Niño event.
- GOSAT observations were used to attribute 2010-2011 El Niño Modoki on the Brazilian carbon balance.
- OCO-2 observations were used to quantify CO_{2} emissions from individual power plants, demonstrating the potential for future space-based CO_{2} emission monitoring.

== Challenges ==
Remote sensing of trace gases has several challenges. Most techniques rely on observing infrared light reflected off Earth's surface. Because these instruments use spectroscopy, at each sounding footprint a spectrum is recorded—this means there is a significantly (about 1000×) more data to transfer than what would be required of just an RGB pixel. Changes in surface albedo and viewing angles may affect measurements, and satellites may employ different viewing modes over different locations; these may be accounted for in the algorithms used to convert raw into final measurements. As with other space-based instruments, space debris must be avoided to prevent damage.

Water vapor can dilute other gases in air and thus change the amount of CO_{2} in a column above the surface of the Earth, so often column-average dry-air mole fractions (X_{CO_{2}}) are reported instead. To calculate this, instruments may also measure O_{2}, which is diluted similarly to other gases, or the algorithms may account for water and surface pressure from other measurements. Clouds may interfere with accurate measurements so platforms may include instruments to measure clouds. Because of measurement imperfections and errors in fitting signals to obtain X_{CO_{2}}, space-based observations may also be compared with ground-based observations such as those from the TCCON.

== List of instruments ==
Instrument/satellite	Primary institution(s)	Service dates	Approximate usable daily soundings	Approximate sounding size	Public data	Notes	Refs
HIRS-2/TOVS (NOAA-10)	NOAA (U.S.)	July 1987– June 1991		100 × 100 km	No	Measuring CO_{2} was not an original mission goal	
IMG (ADEOS I)	NASDA (Japan)	17 August 1996– June 1997	50	8 × 8 km	No	FTS system	
SCIAMACHY (Envisat)	ESA, IUP University of Bremen (Germany)	1 March 2002– May 2012	5,000	30 × 60 km	Yes		
AIRS (Aqua)	JPL (U.S.)	4 May 2002– ongoing	18,000	90 × 90 km	Yes		
IASI (MetOp)	CNES/EUMETSAT (ESA)	19 October 2006		20-39 km diameter	Yes (only a few days)		
GOSAT	JAXA (Japan)	23 January 2009– ongoing	10,000	10.5 km diameter	Yes	First dedicated high precision (<0.3%) mission, also measures CH_{4}	
OCO	JPL (U.S.)	24 February 2009	100,000	1.3 × 2.2 km	N/A	Failed to reach orbit	
OCO-2	JPL (U.S.)	2 July 2014– ongoing	100,000	1.3 × 2.2 km	Yes	High precision (<0.3%)	
GHGSat-D (or Claire)	GHGSat (Canada)	21 June 2016– ongoing	~2–5 images, 10,000+ pixels each	12 × 12 km, 50 m resolution image	available to selected partners only	CubeSat and imaging spectrometer using Fabry-Pérot interferometer	
TanSat (or CarbonSat)	CAS (China)	21 December 2016– ongoing	100,000	1 × 2 km	Yes (L1B radiances)		
GAS FTS aboard FY-3D	CMA (China)	15 November 2017– ongoing	15,000	13 km diameter	No		
GMI (GaoFen-5, (fr))	CAS (China)	8 May 2018– ongoing		10.3 km diameter	No	Spatial heterodyne	
GOSAT-2	JAXA (Japan)	29 October 2018– ongoing	10,000+	9.7 km diameter	Yes (L1B radiances)	Will also measure CH_{4} and CO	
OCO-3	JPL (U.S.)	4 May 2019– ongoing	100,000	<4.5 × 4.5 km	Yes	Mounted on the ISS	
GOSAT-GW	JAXA (Japan)	28 June 2025– ongoing					
MicroCarb	CNES (France)	26 July 2025- ongoing	~30,000	4.5 × 9 km		1 ppm measurement accuracy for CO_{2} measurement. Likely replace OCO-2 by end-2025	
GeoCARB	University of Oklahoma (U.S.)	mission cancelled by NASA	~800,000	3 × 6 km		First CO_{2}-observing geosynchronous satellite, will also measure CH_{4} and CO	

=== Partial column measurements ===
In addition to the total column measurements of CO_{2} down to the ground, there have been several limb sounders that have measured CO_{2} through the edge of Earth's upper atmosphere, and thermal instruments that measure the upper atmosphere during the day and night.

- Sounding of the Atmosphere using Broadband Emission Radiometry (SABER) onboard TIMED launched 7 December 2001 makes measurements in the mesosphere and lower thermosphere in thermal bands.
- ACE-FTS (Atmospheric Chemistry Experiment-Fourier Transform Spectrometer) onboard SCISAT-1 launched 13 August 2003 measures solar spectra, from which profiles of CO_{2} can be calculated.
- SOFIE (Solar Occultation for Ice Experiment) is a limb sounder on board the AIM satellite launched 25 April 2007.

=== Conceptual Missions ===
There have been other conceptual missions which have undergone initial evaluations but have not been chosen to become a part of space-based observing systems. These include:

- Active Sensing of CO_{2} Emissions over Nights, Days, and Seasons (ASCENDS) is a lidar-based mission
- Geostationary Fourier Transform Spectrometer (GeoFTS)
- Atmospheric Imaging Mission for Northern regions (AIM-North) would involve a constellation of two satellites in elliptical orbits to focus on northern regions. The concept is undergoing a Phase 0 study in 2019–2020.
- Carbon Monitoring Satellite (CarbonSat) was a concept for an imaging satellite with global coverage approximately every 6 days. This mission never proceeded beyond the concept phase.
