= Tahani Amer =

Egyptian aerospace engineer

Tahani R. Amer
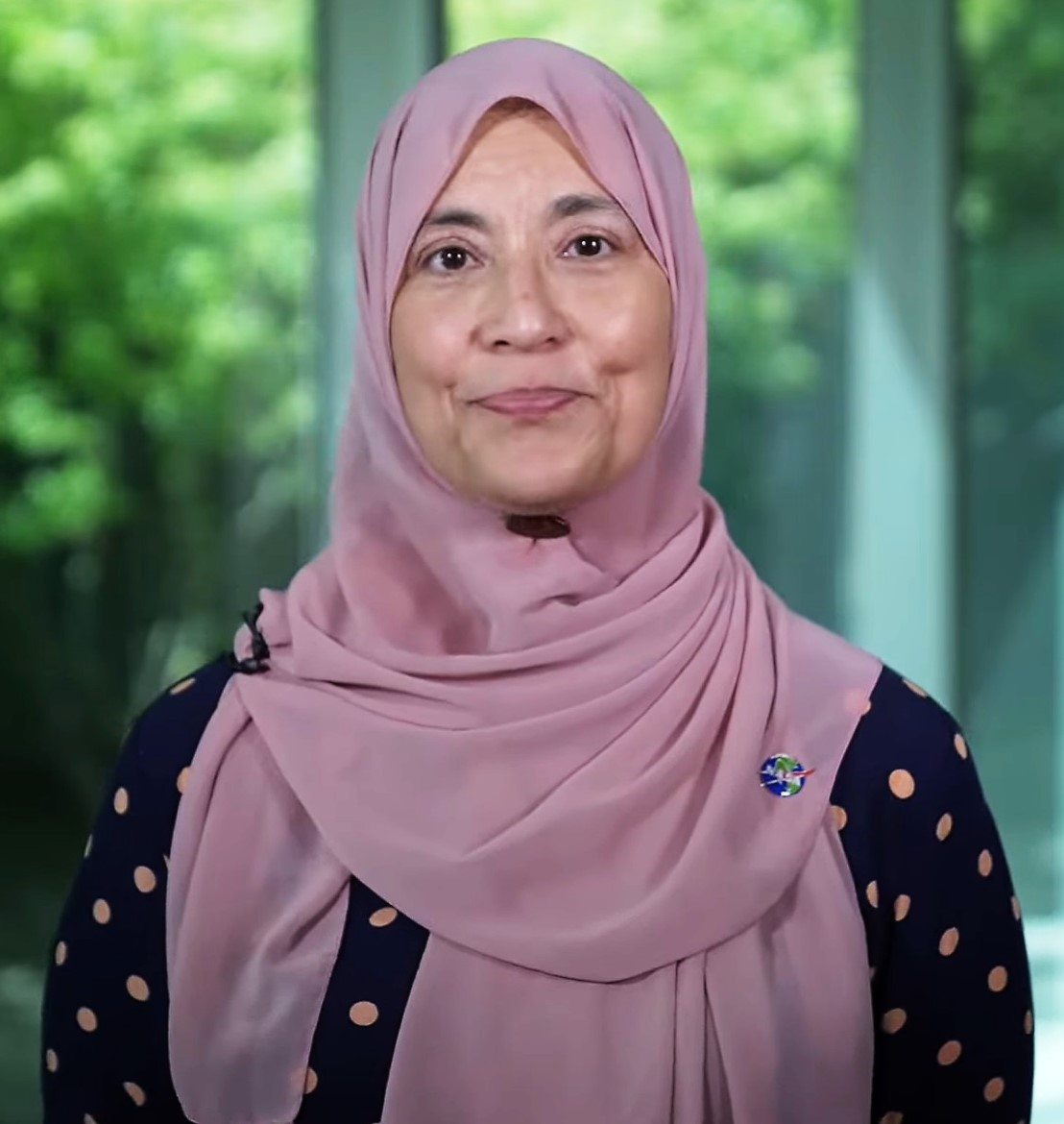
- Amer in 2022
- Born: Cairo
- Education: Old Dominion University
- Scientific career
- Workplaces: NASA Headquarters
- Thesis: Development of Risk Uncertainty Factors from Historical NASA Projects (2011)

Tahani Amer is an Egyptian-American aerospace engineer who is the executive for the Earth Science Division of NASA Headquarters' Science Mission Directorate. She was awarded the 2022 Award for Science from the U.S. Council of Muslim Organizations.

== Early life and education ==
Tahani was born in a suburb of Cairo, where her father encouraged her to pursue a career in engineering. She attended high school in Africa, and, despite mathematics being her favorite subject, had intended on attending medical school. She was married at the age of seventeen, and moved to the United States with two children. When she first moved to the United States she couldn't speak any English. Despite that, she excelled in mathematics, and took engineering courses alongside looking after her children. Amer eventually completed her undergraduate studies at Old Dominion University, where she specialized in mechanical engineering. During her undergraduate studies, she completed an internship with NASA and worked on computational fluid dynamics. This experience motivated Amer to remain at Old Dominion University for graduate studies, with a focus on aerospace engineering. Her doctoral research considered risk factors in NASA missions.

== Research and career ==
Amer returned to NASA, where she developed instruments to measure fuselage drag in wind tunnels. She was eventually appointed an executive in the Science Mission Directorate where she oversaw several missions, including Surface Water and Ocean Topography, CLARREO and GeoCarb (the Geostationary Carbon Cycle Observatory).

Amer was awarded the 2014 NASA Public Service Award for her commitment to improving public awareness about NASA and encouraging people from historically marginalized groups to take part in science. In 2022, she was honored by the U.S. Council of Muslim Organizations for her contributions to science.

== Personal life ==
Amer is a Muslim, and has campaigned to improve the representation of women in engineering.
