= Greenhouse gas inventory =

Inventory for emissions of greenhouse gases

Greenhouse gas inventories or GHG inventories are emission inventories of greenhouse gas (GHG). Scientists use inventories of natural and anthropogenic (human-caused) GHG emissions as tools when developing atmospheric models. Policy makers use inventories to develop strategies and policies for emissions reductions and to track the progress of those policies.

Regulatory agencies and corporations also rely on inventories to establish compliance records with allowable emission rates. Businesses, the public, and other interest groups use inventories to better understand the sources and trends in emissions.

Unlike some other air emission inventories, greenhouse gas inventories include not only emissions from source categories, but also removals by carbon sinks. These removals are typically referred to as carbon sequestration.

Greenhouse gas inventories typically use global warming potential (GWP) values to combine emissions of various greenhouse gases into a single weighted value of emissions.

== Examples ==
Some of the key examples of greenhouse gas inventories include:

- All Annex I countries are required to report annual emissions and sinks of greenhouse gases under the United Nations Framework Convention on Climate Change (UNFCCC)
- National governments that are Parties to the UNFCCC and/or the Kyoto Protocol are required to submit annual inventories of all anthropogenic greenhouse gas emissions from sources and removals from sinks.
- The Kyoto Protocol includes additional requirements for national inventory systems, inventory reporting, and annual inventory review for determining compliance with Articles 5 and 8 of the Protocol.
- Project developers under the Clean Development Mechanism of the Kyoto Protocol prepare inventories as part of their project baselines.

== Greenhouse gas emissions accounting ==
Greenhouse gas emissions accounting is measuring the amount of greenhouse gases (GHG) emitted during a given period of time by a polity, usually a country but sometimes a region or city. Such measures are used to conduct climate science and climate policy.

There are two main, conflicting ways of measuring GHG emissions: production-based (also known as territorial-based) and consumption-based. The Intergovernmental Panel on Climate Change defines production-based emissions as taking place “within national territory and offshore areas over which the country has jurisdiction”. Consumption-based emissions take into account the effects of trade, encompassing the emissions from domestic final consumption and those caused by the production of its imports. From the perspective of trade, consumption-based emissions accounting is thus the reverse of production-based emissions accounting, which includes exports but excludes imports (Table 1).

The choice of accounting method can have very important effects on policymaking, as each measure can generate a very different result. Thus, different values for a National greenhouse gas Emissions Inventory (NEI) could result in a country choosing different optimal mitigation activities, the wrong choice based on wrong information being potentially damaging. The application of production-based emissions accounting is currently favoured in policy terms as it is easier to measure, but it is criticised in the literature principally for its inability to allocate emissions embodied in international trade/transportation and the potential for carbon leakage.

Almost all countries in the world are parties to the Paris Agreement, which requires them to provide regular production-based GHG emissions inventories to the United Nations Framework Convention on Climate Change (UNFCCC), in order to track both countries achievement of their nationally determined contributions and climate policies as well as regional climate policies such as the EU Emissions Trading Scheme (ETS), and the world's progress in limiting global warming.

=== Comparison of production based and consumption-based accounting ===
Over the last few decades emissions have grown at an increasing rate from 1.0% yr^{−1} throughout the 1990s to 3.4% yr^{−1} between 2000 and 2008. These increases have been driven not only by a growing global population and per-capita GDP, but also by global increases in the energy intensity of GDP (energy per unit GDP) and the carbon intensity of energy (emissions per unit energy). These drivers are most apparent in developing markets (Kyoto non-Annex B countries), but what is less apparent is that a substantial fraction of the growth in these countries is to satisfy the demand of consumers in developed countries (Kyoto Annex B countries). This is exaggerated by a process known as Carbon Leakage whereby Annex B countries decrease domestic production in place of increased importation of products from non-Annex B countries where emission policies are less strict. Although this may seem the rational choice for consumers when considering local pollutants, consumers are inescapably affected by global pollutants such as GHG, irrespective of where production occurs. Although emissions during the 2008 financial crisis, the longer-term trend of increased emissions has resumed.

Today, much international effort is put into slowing the anthropogenic release of GHG and resulting climate change. In order to set benchmarks and emissions targets for - as well as monitor and evaluate the progress of - international and regional policies, the accurate measurement of each country's NEI becomes imperative.

A comparison of the production-based and consumption-based national emissions inventories (NEI).
Criteria	Production-based NEI	Consumption-based NEI
Emissions covered	Administered territory	Global
Allocation	Domestic production	Domestic consumption
Allocation of trade	Includes exports, not imports	Includes imports, not exports
Mitigation focus	Domestic activities including exports	Domestic activities and imports (exports excluded)
Comparability	Consistent with GDP	Consistent with national consumption
Consistent with trade policy	No	Yes
Annex I emissions coverage	Lower	Higher
Complexity	Low	High
Transparency	High	Low
Uncertainty	Lower	Higher
Current country coverage	Relatively high	Low with current data
Mitigation analysis	Domestic mitigation only	Global mitigation

=== Production-based accounting ===
As production-based emissions accounting is currently favoured in policy terms, its methodology is well established. Emissions are calculated not directly but indirectly from fossil fuel usage and other relevant processes such as industry and agriculture according to 2006 guidelines issued by the IPCC for GHG reporting. The guidelines span numerous methodologies dependent on the level of sophistication (Tiers 1–3 in Table 2). The simplest methodology combines the extent of human activity with a coefficient quantifying the emissions from that activity, known as an ‘emission factor’. For example, to estimate emissions from the energy sector (typically contributing over 90% of CO_{2} emissions and 75% of all GHG emissions in developed countries) the quantity of fuels combusted is combined with an emission factor - the level of sophistication increasing with the accuracy and complexity of the emission factor. Table 2 outlines how the UK implements these guidelines to estimate some of its emissions-producing activities.

Table 2. Some emissions producing activities and methods used to estimate emissions. IPCC tier represents one of three tiers, each tier indicating an additional layer of sophistication. These tiers indicate which method of emissions calculations is used from the IPCC 1996 Guidelines.
Activity	GHG	IPCC Tier	Method used to estimate emissions
Public electricity and heat production	CO_{2}	2	An emissions factor is applied to fuel consumption data from DUKES. Some data are also collected from individual point sources at generation facilities. The emissions factors are UK specific factors obtained by sampling average UK carbon content of fuels.
Road transportation	CO_{2}, CH_{4}, N_{2}O	3	Emissions from road transport are estimated from a combination of total fuel consumption data taken from the Digest of UK Energy Statistics and fuel properties, and from a combination of drive related emission factors and road traffic data on fuel use, car type, miles driven, road types, and fuel type from the Department for Transport.
Domestic aviation	CO_{2}, CH_{4}, N_{2}O	3	Data from the Department for Transport and Civil Aviation Authority on aircraft movements is broken down by aircraft type at each UK airport. The model takes into account the lengths of time spent on different parts of an aircraft's take off and landing cycle and different types of aircraft used in the UK.
Refrigeration and air conditioning equipment	HFC	2	Data on the numbers of UK domestic and commercial refrigerators is obtained from the UK Market Transformation Programme and activity data supplied by industry. Data on mobile air conditioning systems is obtained from the UK Society of Motor Manufacturers and Traders. Once the numbers and size of refrigerators is known, an emissions factor which was derived to reflect UK refrigeration fluids applied to estimate emissions
Enteric Fermentation	CH_{4}	2	Enteric fermentation is a digestive process in ruminant animals which produces methane. Emissions are estimated from animal production data from the June agricultural census. Emissions factors for milk producing cattle, lambs and deer are calculated using a tier 2 approach which takes into account the sizes, ages and types of UK animals.
Agricultural soils	N_{2}O	1 and 2	The method involves estimating the contributions from the use of inorganic fertilizer, biological fixation of nitrogen by crops, ploughing in crop residues, cultivation of organic soils, spreading animal manure on land, and manures dropped by animals grazing in the field using data from DEFRA and the British Survey of Fertiliser Practice. For some of these areas IPCC default methods are used and for other UK specific methods are used.
Wastewater handling	CH_{4}, N_{2}O	2	The estimate is based on the work of Hobson et al. (1996) who estimated emissions of methane for the years 1990–95. Subsequent years are extrapolated on the basis of population. Sewage disposed to landfill is included in landfill emissions

Emissions from burning wood are counted against the country where the trees were felled rather than the country where they are burnt.

=== Consumption-based accounting ===
Consumption-based emissions accounting has an equally established methodology using Input-Output Tables. These "display the interconnection between different sectors of production and allow for a tracing of the production and consumption in an economy" and were originally created for national economies. However, as production has become increasingly international and the import/export market between nations has flourished, Multi-Regional Input-Output (MRIO) models have been developed. The unique feature of MRIO is allowing a product to be traced across its production cycle, "quantifying the contributions to the value of the product from different economic sectors in various countries represented in the model. It hence offers a description of the global supply chains of products consumed". From this, assuming regional- and industry-specific data for CO_{2} emissions per unit of output are available, the total amount of emissions for the product can be calculated, and therefore the amount of emissions the final consumer is allocated responsibility for.

The two methodologies of emissions accounting begin to expose their key differences. Production-based accounting is transparently consistent with GDP, whereas consumption-based accounting (more complex and uncertain) is consistent with national consumption and trade. However, the most important difference is that the latter covers global emissions - including those ‘embodied’ emissions that are omitted in production-based accounting - and offers globally based mitigation options. Thus the attribution of emissions embodied in international trade is the crux of the matter.

=== Emissions embodied in international trade ===
Figure 1 and Table 3 show extent of emissions embodied in international trade and thus their importance when attempting emissions reductions. Figure 1 shows the international trade flows of the top 10 countries with largest trade fluxes in 2004 and illustrates the dominance of trade from developing countries (principally China, Russia and India) to developed countries (principally USA, EU and Japan). Table 3 supports this showing that the traded emissions in 2008 total 7.8 gigatonnes (Gt) with a net CO_{2} emissions trade from developing to developed countries of 1.6 Gt.

Table 3 also shows how these processes of production, consumption and trade have changed from 1990 (commonly chosen for baseline levels) to 2008. Global emissions have risen 39%, but in the same period developed countries seem to have stabilized their domestic emissions, whereas developing countries’ domestic emissions have doubled. This ‘stabilization’ is arguably misleading, however, if the increased trade from developing to developed countries is considered. This has increased from 0.4 Gt CO_{2} to 1.6 Gt CO_{2} - a 17%/year average growth meaning 16 Gt CO_{2} have been traded from developing to developed countries between 1990 and 2008. Assuming a proportion of the increased production in developing countries is to fulfil the consumption demands of developed countries, the process known as carbon leakage becomes evident. Thus, including international trade (i.e. the methodology of consumption-based accounting) reverses the apparent decreasing trend in emissions in developed countries, changing a 2% decrease (as calculated by production-based accounting) into a 7% increase across the time period. This point is only further emphasized when these trends are studied at a less aggregated scale.

Table 3. Allocation of global emissions to Annex B and non-Annex B countries separated into domestic and internationally traded components.
	Component	1990 (Gt CO_{2})	2008 (Gt CO_{2})	Growth (%/y)
Annex B				
Domestic	Annex B Domestic (Bdom)	11.3	10.8	-0.3
Trade component	Annex B to Annex B (B2B)	2.1	2.2	0.2
	Annex B to non-Annex B (B2nB)	0.7	0.9	1.8
Production	Annex B production (Bprod = Bdom + B2B + B2nB)	14.2	13.9	-0.1
Consumption	Annex B consumption (Bcons = Bdom + B2B + nB2B)	14.5	15.5	0.3
Non-Annex B				
Domestic	Non-Annex B domestic (nBdom)	6.2	11.7	4.6
Trade component	Non-Annex B to Annex B (nB2B)	1.1	2.6	7.0
	Non-Annex B to non-Annex B (nB2nB)	0.4	2.2	21.5
Production	Non-Annex B production (nBprod = nBdom + nB2B + nB2nB)	7.7	16.4	5.9
Consumption	Non-Annex B consumption (nBcons = nBdom + B2nB + nB2nB)	7.4	14.8	5.3
Trade totals	Traded emissions (B2B + B2nB + nB2B + nB2nB)	4.3	7.8	4.3
	Trade balance (B2nB − nB2B)	-0.4	-1.6	16.9
	Global emissions (Bprod + nBprod = Bcons + nBcon)	21.9	30.3	2.0

Figure 2 shows the percentage surplus of emissions as calculated by production-based accounting over consumption-based accounting. In general, production-based accounting proposes lower emissions for the EU and OECD countries (developed countries) and higher emissions for BRIC and rest of the world (developing countries). However, consumption-based accounting proposes the reverse with lower emissions in BRIC and RoW, and higher emissions in EU and OECD countries. This led Boitier to term EU and OECD ‘CO_{2} consumers’ and BRIC and RoW ‘CO_{2} producers’.

The large difference in these results is corroborated by further analysis. The EU-27 in 1994 counted emissions using the consumption-based approach at 11% higher than those counted using the production-based approach, this difference rising to 24% in 2008. Similarly OECD countries reached a peak variance of 16% in 2006 whilst dropping to 14% in 2008. In contrast, although RoW starts and ends relatively equal, in the intervening years it is a clear CO_{2} producer, as are BRIC with an average consumption-based emissions deficit of 18.5% compared to production-based emissions.

Peters and Hertwich completed a MRIO study to calculate emissions embodied in international trade using data from the 2001 Global Trade Analysis Program (GTAP). After manipulation, although their numbers are slightly more conservative (EU 14%; OECD 3%; BRIC 16%; RoW 6%) than Boitier the same trend is evident - developed countries are CO_{2} consumers and developing countries are CO_{2} producers. This trend is seen across the literature and supporting the use of consumption-based emissions accounting in policy-making decisions.

== Tools and standards ==
=== ISO 14064 ===
The ISO 14064 standards (published in 2006 and early 2007) are the most recent additions to the ISO 14000 series of international standards for environmental management. The ISO 14064 standards provide governments, businesses, regions and other organisations with an integrated set of tools for programs aimed at measuring, quantifying and reducing greenhouse gas emissions. These standards allow organisations take part in emissions trading schemes using a globally recognised standard.

=== Local Government Operations Protocol ===
The Local Government Operations Protocol (LGOP) is a tool for accounting and reporting greenhouse gas emissions across a local government's operations. Adopted by the California Air Resources Board (ARB) in September 2008 for local governments to develop and report consistent GHG inventories to help meet California's AB 32 GHG reduction obligations, it was developed in partnership with California Climate Action Registry, The Climate Registry, ICLEI and dozens of stakeholders.

The California Sustainability Alliance also created the Local Government Operations Protocol Toolkit, which breaks down the complexities of the LGOP manual and provides an area by area summary of the recommended inventory protocols.

==== Know IPCC Format for GHG Emissions Inventory ====
The data in the GHG emissions inventory is presented using the IPCC format (seven sectors presented using the Common Reporting Format, or CRF) as is all communication between Member States and the Secretariat of the United Nations Framework Convention on Climate Change (UNFCCC) and the Kyoto Protocol.

== Advantages of consumption-based accounting ==
Consumption-based emissions accounting may be deemed superior as it incorporates embodied emissions currently ignored by the UNFCCC preferred production-based accounting. Other key advantages include: extending mitigation options, covering more global emissions through increased participation, and inherently encompassing policies such as the Clean Development Mechanism (CDM).

=== Extending mitigation options ===
Under the production-based system a country is punished for having a pollution intensive resource base. If this country has pollution intensive exports, such as Norway where 69% of its CO_{2} emissions are the result of production for export, a simple way to meet its emissions reductions set out under Kyoto would be to reduce its exports. Although this would be environmentally advantageous, it would be economically and politically harmful as exports are an important part of a country's GDP. However, by having appropriate mechanisms in place, such as a harmonized global tax, border-tax adjustment or quotas, a consumption-based accounting system could shift the comparative advantage towards a decision that includes environmental factors. The tax most discussed is based on the carbon content of the fossil fuels used to produce and transport the product, the greater the level of carbon used the more tax being charged. If a country did not voluntarily participate then a border tax could be imposed on them. This system would have the effect of embedding the cost of environmental load in the price of the product and therefore market forces would shift production to where it is economically and environmentally preferable, thus reducing GHG emissions

=== Increasing participation ===
In addition to reducing emissions directly this system may also alleviate competitiveness concerns in twofold ways: firstly, domestic and foreign producers are exposed to the same carbon tax; and secondly, if multiple countries are competing for the same export market they can promote environmental performance as a marketing tool. A loss of competitiveness resulting from the absence of legally binding commitments for non-Annex B countries was the principal reason the US and Australia, two heavily emitting countries, did not originally ratify the Kyoto Protocol (Australia later ratified in 2007). By alleviating such concerns more countries may participate in future climate policies resulting in a greater percentage of global emissions being covered by legally binding reduction policies. Furthermore, as developed countries are currently expected to reduce their emissions more than developing countries, the more emissions are (fairly) attributed to developed countries the more they become covered by legally bound reduction policies. Peters argues that this last prediction means that consumption-based accounting would advantageously result in greater emissions reductions irrespective of increased participation. Only Annex I countries use the 2006 IPCC guidelines, while non-Annex I countries are still in the process of developing GHG emission inventories and are not required to go by the 2006 guidelines.

=== Encompassing policies such as the CDM ===
The CDM is a flexible mechanism set up under the Kyoto Protocol with the aim of creating ‘Carbon Credits’ for trade in trading schemes such as the EU ETS. Despite coming under heavy criticism (see Evans, p134-135; and Burniaux et al., p58-65), the theory is that as the marginal cost of environmental abatement is lower in non-Annex B countries a scheme like this will promote technology transfer from Annex B to non-Annex B countries resulting in cheaper emissions reductions. Because under consumption-based emissions accounting a country is responsible for the emissions caused by its imports, it is important for the importing country to encourage good environmental behaviour and promote the cleanest production technologies available in the exporting country. Therefore, unlike the Kyoto Protocol where the CDM was added later, consumption-based emissions accounting inherently promotes clean development in the foreign country because of the way it allocates emissions. One loophole that remains relevant is carbon colonialism whereby developed countries do not mitigate the underlying problem but simply continue to increase consumption offsetting this by exploiting the abatement potential of developing countries.

== Disadvantages of consumption-based accounting ==
Despite its advantages consumption-based emissions accounting is not without its drawbacks. These were highlighted above and in Table 1 and are principally: greater uncertainty, greater complexity requiring more data not always available, and requiring greater international collaboration.

=== Greater uncertainty and complexity ===
Uncertainty derives from three main reasons: production-based accounting is much closer to statistical sources and GDP which are more assured; the methodology behind consumption-based accounting requires an extra step over production-based accounting, this step inherently incurring further doubt; and consumption-based accounting includes data from all trading partners of a particular country which will contain different levels of accuracy. The bulk of data required is its second pitfall as in some countries the lack of data means consumption-based accounting is not possible. However, levels and accuracy of data will improve as more and better techniques are developed and the scientific community produce more data sets - examples including the recently launched global databases: EORA from the University of Sydney, EXIOPOL and WIOD databases from European consortia, and the Asian IDE-JETRO. In the short term it will be important to attempt to quantify the level of uncertainty more accurately.

=== Greater international co-operation ===
The third problem is that consumption-based accounting requires greater international collaboration to deliver effective results. A Government has the authority to implement policies only over emissions it directly generates. In consumption-based accounting emissions from different geo-political territories are allocated to the importing country. Although the importing country can indirectly oppose this by changing its importing habits or by applying a border tax as discussed, only by greater international collaboration, through an international dialogue such as the UNFCCC, can direct and meaningful emissions reductions be enforced.

== Sharing emissions responsibility ==
Thus far it has been implied that one must implement either production-based accounting or consumption-based accounting. However, there are arguments that the answer lies somewhere in the middle i.e. emissions should be shared between the importing and exporting countries. This approach asserts that although it is the final consumer that ultimately initiates the production, the activities that create the product and associated pollution also contribute to the producing country's GDP. This topic is still developing in the literature principally through works by Rodrigues et al., Lenzen et al., Marques et al. as well as through empirical studies by such as Andrew and Forgie. Crucially it proposes that at each stage of the supply chain the emissions are shared by some pre-defined criteria between the different actors involved.

Whilst this approach of sharing emissions responsibility seems advantageous, the controversy arises over what these pre-defined criteria should be. Two of the current front runners are Lenzen et al. who say “the share of responsibility allocated to each agent should be proportional to its value added” and Rodrigues et al. who say it should be based on “the average between an agent's consumption-based responsibility and income-based responsibility” (quoted in Marques et al.). As no criteria set has been adequately developed and further work is needed to produce a finished methodology for a potentially valuable concept.

== Trends ==
Measures of regions' GHG emissions are critical to climate policy. It is clear that production-based emissions accounting, the currently favoured method for policy-making, significantly underestimates the level of GHG emitted by excluding emissions embodied in international trade. Implementing consumption-based accounting which includes such emissions, developed countries take a greater share of GHG emissions and consequently the low level of emissions commitments for developing countries are not as important. Not only does consumption-based accounting encompass global emissions, it promotes good environmental behaviour and increases participation by reducing competitiveness.

Despite these advantages the shift from production-based to consumption-based accounting arguably represents a shift from one extreme to another. The third option of sharing responsibility between importing and exporting countries represents a compromise between the two systems. However, as yet no adequately developed methodology exists for this third way, so further study is required before it can be implemented for policy-making decisions.

Today, given its lower uncertainty, established methodology and reporting, consistency between political and environmental boundaries, and widespread implementation, it is hard to see any movement away from the favoured production-based accounting. However, because of its key disadvantage of omitting emissions embodied in international trade, it is clear that consumption-based accounting provides invaluable information and should at least be used as a ‘shadow’ to production-based accounting. With further work into the methodologies of consumption-based accounting and sharing emissions responsibility, both can play greater roles in the future of climate policy.

== See also ==
- Carbon footprint
- Environmental economics
- Greenhouse gas monitoring
- Greenhouse Gases Observing Satellite (GOSAT) (Ibuki)
