= Greenhouse Gases Observing Satellite-2 =

Japanese Earth observation satellite

- Names: Ibuki-2
- Mission type: Environmental
- Operator: JAXA
- COSPAR ID: 2018-084B
- SATCAT no.: 43672
- Website: www.satnavi.jaxa.jp/e/project/gosat2/
- Mission duration: 5 years (planned); Elapsed: 7 years, 3 months, 8 days

Spacecraft properties
- Manufacturer: Mitsubishi Electric
- Launch mass: 1,800 kilograms (4,000 lb)
- Power: 5000 W

Start of mission
- Launch date: 29 October 2018 04:08 UTC
- Rocket: H-IIA F40
- Launch site: Tanegashima, Yoshinobu 1
- Contractor: Mitsubishi Heavy Industries

Orbital parameters
- Reference system: Geocentric
- Regime: Low Earth
- Eccentricity: 0.00106
- Altitude: 612.98 km
- Inclination: 97.84°
- Period: 98.1 minutes

Main Instrument
- Wavelengths: 0.75 – 0.77 μm / 1.56 – 1.69 μm / 1.92 – 2.38 μm / 5.6 – 8.4 μm / 8.4 – 14.3 μm (FTS-2)
- Resolution: 0.2 cm^{−1} (FTS-2)

Instruments
- TANSO-FTS-2 - Infrared Fourier Transform Spectrometer; TANSO-CAI-2 - Thermal and Near-Infrared Sensor

The Greenhouse Gases Observing Satellite-2 (GOSAT-2), also known as Ibuki-2 (Japanese: いぶき2号, Hepburn: Ibuki nigō), is an Earth observation satellite dedicated to greenhouse gas monitoring. It is a successor of Greenhouse Gases Observing Satellite (GOSAT). The GOSAT-2 was developed as a joint project of the Japan Aerospace Exploration Agency (JAXA), Ministry of the Environment, and the National Institute for Environmental Studies (NIES). It was launched on 29 October 2018 from the Tanegashima Space Center aboard the H-IIA rocket.

== Comparison to GOSAT ==
Major changes in comparison to the previous GOSAT are:

- Improved measurement precision.
- FTS-2 can also monitor carbon monoxide (CO) and nitrogen dioxide (NO_{2}).
- FTS-2 can select cloud-free point automatically for observation.
- While GOSAT's CAI was observing nadir view, GOSAT-2's CAI-2 observes forward (20 degree) and backward (20 degree) simultaneously.
- CAI-2 can also monitor PM2.5 and black carbon.

== Successor: GOSAT-GW ==
GOSAT-GW (Ibuki GW), the successor of GOSAT-2 and GCOM-W "Shizuku", was launched on 28 June 2025 on the last flight of the H-IIA launch vehicle. It was under development for launch in JFY2024. Due to the delay of development, it was delayed to be launched in JFY2025.
