= Geostationary Carbon Cycle Observatory =

Geostationary Carbon Cycle Observatory (GeoCarb or GeoCARB) was an intended NASA Venture-class Earth observation mission that was designed to measure the carbon cycle, building off the success of OCO-2, but in geostationary orbit.

GeoCarb was to be stationed over the Americas and make observations between 50° North and South latitudes in geostationary Earth orbit 35,786 km above the equator. Its primary mission was to conduct observations of vegetation health and stress by measuring solar-induced fluorescence, as well as observe the processes that govern the movement of greenhouse gases in the carbon cycle.

Selected by NASA in 2016.

It was originally intended to be mounted on a commercial geostationary communication satellite operated by SES S.A., but instead NASA, in February 2022, sought a standalone spacecraft to carry GeoCarb.

On 28 November 2022, NASA announced the cancellation of development of the GeoCarb mission, citing cost overruns, technical concerns, and the availability of other options to measure and observe greenhouse gases, like the EMIT instrument on the ISS and the upcoming Earth System Observatory. NASA worked with the University of Oklahoa to close the project which was scheduled to be launched around the end of June 2025.

GeoCarb was a joint collaboration between NASA's Ames Research Center, Goddard Space Flight Center, and Jet Propulsion Laboratory; the University of Oklahoma; Colorado State University; the Lockheed Martin Advanced Technology Center of Palo Alto, California; and SES Government Solutions (now SES Space & Defense) of Reston, Florida. The instrument is built by Lockheed Martin Advanced Technology Center.

== Uses ==
It would have been able to detect gas leaks remotely and efficiently from orbit, which at the time it had to be done via manual inspection by crews on the ground looking for a gas leak. Using this method would have saved money (approximately $5-10 billion a year in the US alone) and reduce the carbon footprint of natural gas due to less waste during a leak due to the increased speed and frequency of identification. Additionally, airborne sensors weren't as available as they are at present making this a more viable option at the time.

== Instrumentation ==
GeoCARB is an athmospheric chemistry type of instrument which consisted of an aperture assembly, 4 focal plane assemblies, a telescope, a Cold Optical Bench, 2 grating spectrometers, and the necessary electrical components. Its near-infared sensor could have detected and measured CO_{2}, CO, methane, and solar-induced fluorescence or SIF.

It would have been able to view an area of approximately 2,800 km (1,740 miles) north to south and 6 km (3.7 miles) east to west of the US and South America where it would have been stationed above at a rate 2.25 hours for the entirety of the continental US and 2.75 hours for South America.

== Technical specifications ==
The instrument would have weighed approximately 138kg (304 lbs) and would have had a volume of 2 m^{3}. It would have required approximately 128 W and would have had a data rate of 10 Mbit/s operating in the bands of 0.76 μm, 1.61 μm, 2.06 μm and 2.32 μm.

== Statements about the project ==
Principal Investigator Berrien Moore of the University of Oklahoma stated, "In designing our instrument we said, let's do OCO, but in geostationary orbit. We're building on JPL's work in designing and building OCO-2 and processing its data. In fact, many members of our science team are also working on the OCO-2 mission."

== See also ==
- Orbiting Carbon Observatory
- Orbiting Carbon Observatory 2
- Space-based measurements of carbon dioxide
