= Global Change Observation Mission =

JAXA project of long-term observation of Earth

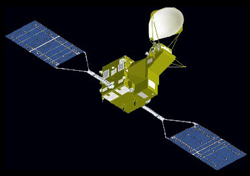
An artist's rendering of GCOM-W1.

GCOM (Global Change Observation Mission), is a JAXA project of long-term observation of Earth environmental changes. As a part of Japan's contributions to GEOSS (Global Earth Observation System of Systems), GCOM will be continued for 10 to 15 years with observation and utilization of global geophysical data such as precipitation, snow, water vapor, aerosol, for climate change prediction, water management, and food security. On May 18, 2012, the first satellite "GCOM-W" (nickname "Shizuku") was launched. On December 23, 2017, the second satellite "GCOM-C1" (nickname "Shikisai") was launched.

== GCOM-W ==
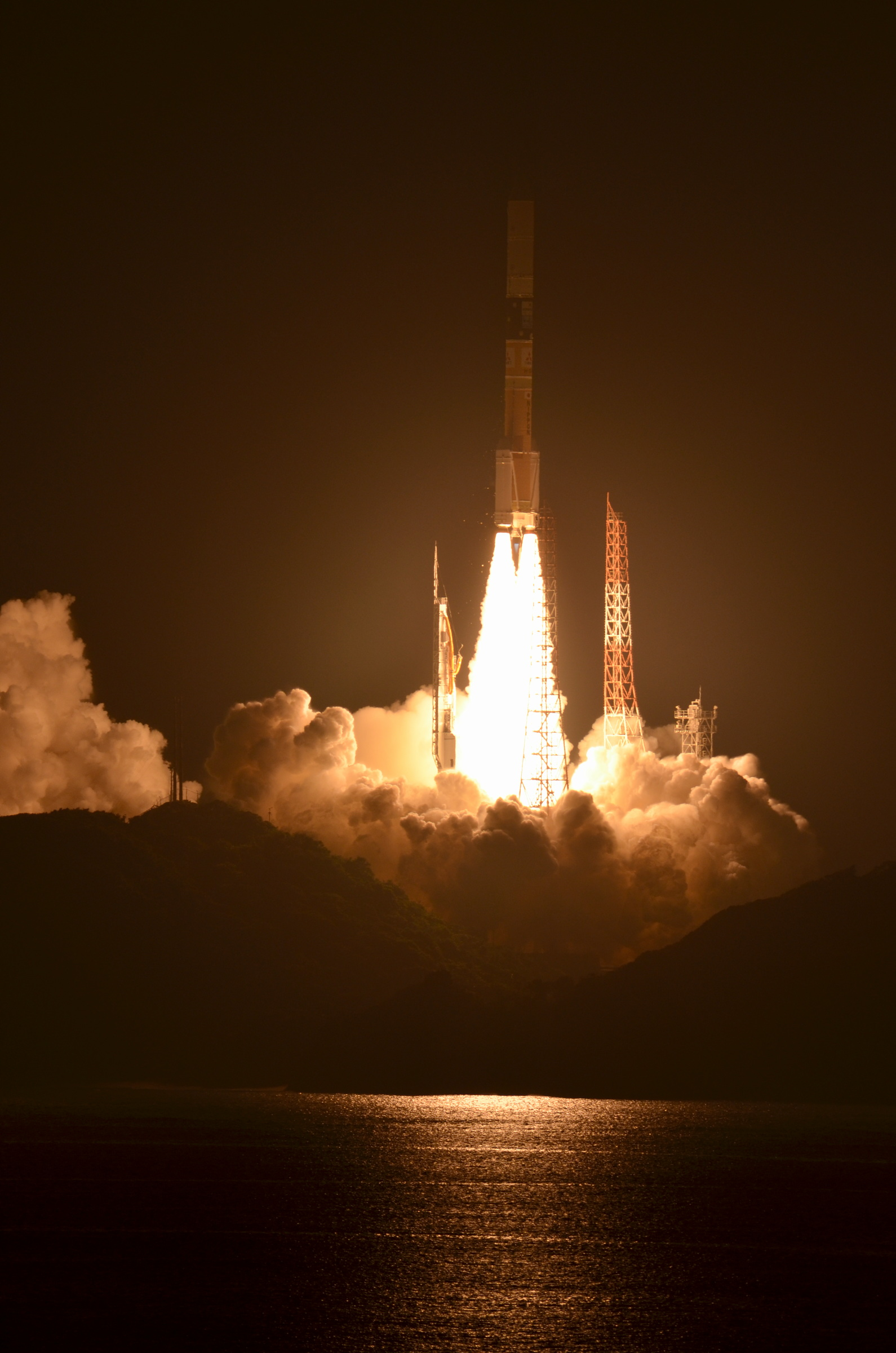
Launch of GCOM-W aboard a H-IIA rocket.

GCOM-W (Global Change Observation Mission – Water; nickname "Shizuku") is the first in the GCOM series. Its mission is to observe the water cycle. The satellite carries the AMSR2 (Advanced Microwave Scanning Radiometer 2) instrument, the successor to the AMSR-E carried by Aqua. This microwave radiometer will observe precipitation, water vapor, wind velocity above the ocean, sea water temperature, water levels on land areas, and snow depths. GCOM-W was approved in 2006, and development of the satellite started in 2007 with a mission budget of 20 billion Yen (US$200 Million). Mass of the satellite is 1990 kg. Planned lifespan is 5 years. Polar orbit (altitude 700 km) with equator crossing local time on the ascending orbit is 13:30PM +/- 00:15.

GCOM-W was launched on May 17, 2012, via a H-IIA rocket, and it flies in a Sun-synchronous orbit as part of the "A-train" satellite constellation. It successfully began collecting data on July 4, 2012. Its planned lifespan of 5 years means that the satellite is set to operate until 2017, although JAXA hopes that it will last longer.

== GCOM-C1 ==
GCOM-C1 (Global Change Observation Mission – Climate; nickname "Shikisai"), the first satellite in the GCOM-C series, will monitor global climate change by observing the surface and atmosphere of Earth over the course of 5 years. Through use of its SGLI (Second generation GLobal Imager) optical instrument, it will collect data related to the carbon cycle and radiation budget, such as measurements of clouds, aerosols, ocean color, vegetation, and snow and ice. From its Sun-synchronous orbit (altitude 798 km), SGLI will collect a complete picture of Earth every 2–3 days with a resolution of 250-1000m, across the UV, visible, and infrared spectrums. Mass of the satellite is 2020 kg. Equator crossing local time on the descending orbit is 10:30AM +/- 00:15.

GCOM-C was launched on December 23, 2017, via a H-IIA rocket.

== Sensors ==
=== AMSR2 ===
AMSR2 (Advanced Microwave Scanning Radiometer 2) is an improved version of AMSR (aperture 2.0 m) on ADEOS II and AMSR-E (aperture 1.6 m) on NASA's Aqua satellite. By rotating a disc antenna (diameter 2.0 m) in 1.5 s period, it scans the Earth surface along an arc of 1450 km length. Reliability is better than AMSR and AMSR-E. Planned lifetime has been extended from 3 years to 5 years.

A new microwave band, namely 7.3 GHz, has been added. The 7.3 GHz band is for duplication and calibration of 6.925 GHz band. AMSR2 continues the legacy of AMSR-E, which also observed as part of the A-Train constellation.

AMSR2 observation frequency
| parameter / frequency (GHz) | 6.925/ 7.3 | 10.65 | 18.7 | 23.8 | 36.5 | 89.0 | comments |
|---|---|---|---|---|---|---|---|
| column vapor | | | ○ | ◎ | ○ | | |
| column precipitable water | | | ○ | ○ | ◎ | | |
| precipitation | | ○ | ◎ | ○ | ○ | ◎ | |
| sea surface temperature | ◎ | ○ | | ○ | ○ | | |
| sea surface wind speed | ○ | ○ | | ○ | ◎ | | |
| sea ice density | ○ | | ◎ | ○ | ◎ | ◎ | 89 GHz is only for cloudless area |
| snowpack | | ○ | ◎ | ○ | ◎ | ○ | |
| soil moisture | ◎ | ◎ | ○ | ○ | ○ | ○ | |

Note: ◎ means the most important band for that purpose.

=== SGLI ===
SGLI (Second-generation Global Imager) is a multi-band optical radiometer and the successor of GLI sensor on ADEOS-II. It consists of two sensors: SGLI-VNR (an electronic scan) and SGLI-IRS (a mechanical scan). SGLI-VNR succeeds the technology of MESSR on MOS-1, OPS/VNIR on JERS-1, AVNIR on ADEOS, and AVNIR-2 on ALOS.

The number of channels of SGLI is 19, which is much less than GLI (36 channels). This is because SGLI carefully selected the essential bands for observations.

The swath size is 1150 km for SGLI-VNR and 1400 km for SGLI-IRS. Although a little reduction from GLI (all channels were mechanical scan with 1400 km swath), it has more bands with high-resolution (250 m). Polarimetry function has been added to SGLI-VNR, which helps detection of size of aerosol particles, enabling detection of source of the aerosols.

The lesson of GLI sensor's too big and too complicated structure, SGLI is divided to two simple systems, and the number of channels have been minimized to really essential bands, aiming at better reliability and survivability.

SGLI observation channels
| instruments | | channel | central wavelength | bandwidth | resolution | target |
|---|---|---|---|---|---|---|
| SGLI- VNR | non- polarization | VN1 | 380 nm | 10.6 nm | 250 m | terrestrial aerosol, atmospheric correction, ocean color, snow and ice |
| SGLI- VNR | non- polarization | VN2 | 412 nm | 10.3 nm | 250 m | vegetation, terrestrial aerosol, atmospheric correction, oceanic aerosol, photosynthetic active radiation, snow and ice |
| SGLI- VNR | non- polarization | VN3 | 443 nm | 10.1 nm | 250 m | vegetation, oceanic aerosol, atmospheric correction, photosynthetic active radiation, ocean color, snow and ice |
| SGLI- VNR | non- polarization | VN4 | 490 nm | 10.3 nm | 250 m | ocean color (chlorophyll, suspended sediments) |
| SGLI- VNR | non- polarization | VN5 | 530 nm | 19.1 nm | 250 m | photosynthetic active radiation, ocean color (chlorophyll) |
| SGLI- VNR | non- polarization | VN6 | 565 nm | 19.8 nm | 250 m | ocean color (chlorophyll, suspended sediments, colored dissolved organic matters) |
| SGLI- VNR | non- polarization | VN7 | 673.5 nm | 22 nm | 250 m | vegetation, terrestrial aerosol, atmospheric correction, ocean color |
| SGLI- VNR | non- polarization | VN8 | 673.5 nm | 21.9 nm | 250 m | vegetation, terrestrial aerosol, atmospheric correction, ocean color |
| SGLI- VNR | non- polarization | VN9 | 763 nm | 11.4 nm | 1000 m | liquid cloud geometric thickness |
| SGLI- VNR | non- polarization | VN10 | 868.5 nm | 20.9 nm | 250 m | vegetation, terrestrial aerosol, atmospheric correction, ocean color, snow and ice |
| SGLI- VNR | non- polarization | VN11 | 868.5 nm | 20.8 nm | 250 m | vegetation, terrestrial aerosol, atmospheric correction, ocean color, snow and ice |
| SGLI- VNR | polarization | P1 | 673.5 nm | 20.6 nm | 1000 m | vegetation, terrestrial aerosol, atmospheric correction, ocean color |
| SGLI- VNR | polarization | P2 | 868.5 nm | 20.3 nm | 1000 m | vegetation, terrestrial aerosol, atmospheric correction, ocean color, snow and ice |
| SGLI- IRS | short wave infrared (SWIR) | SW1 | 1050 nm | 21.1 nm | 1000 m | liquid cloud optical thickness, particle size |
| SGLI- IRS | short wave infrared (SWIR) | SW2 | 1380 nm | 20.1 nm | 1000 m | detection of clouds over snow and ice |
| SGLI- IRS | short wave infrared (SWIR) | SW3 | 1630 nm | 195 nm | 250 m | detection of clouds over snow and ice |
| SGLI- IRS | short wave infrared (SWIR) | SW4 | 2210 nm | 50.4 nm | 1000 m | liquid cloud optical thickness, particle size |
| SGLI- IRS | thermal infrared (TIR) | T1 | 10.8 μm | 0.756 μm | 250 m | surface temperature of land, ocean, snow & ice. Fire detection, vegetation water stress |
| SGLI- IRS | thermal infrared (TIR) | T2 | 12.0 μm | 0.759 μm | 250 m | surface temperature of land, ocean, snow & ice. Fire detection, vegetation water stress |

== See also ==
- ADEOS (Midori)
- ADEOS II (Midori II)
- A-train
- GEOSS
- GOSAT (Ibuki)
- GOSAT-GW (Ibuki GW)
- Sentinel programme
