= O-Cresolphthalein =

o-Cresolphthalein

Names
- Preferred IUPAC name 3,3-Bis(4-hydroxy-3-methylphenyl)-2-benzofuran-1(3H)-one

Identifiers
CAS Number	596-27-0
3D model (JSmol)	Interactive image
Beilstein Reference	5-18-04-00193
ChEMBL	ChEMBL1443546
ChemSpider	62217
ECHA InfoCard	100.008.985
EC Number	209-881-8
PubChem CID	68995
UNII	XOU2D9049G
CompTox Dashboard (EPA)	DTXSID9060491
- InChI: InChI=1S/C22H18O4/c1-13-11-15(7-9-19(13)23)22(16-8-10-20(24)14(2)12-16)18-6-4-3-5-17(18)21(25)26-22/h3-12,23-24H,1-2H3 Key: CPBJMKMKNCRKQB-UHFFFAOYSA-N
- SMILES: CC1=C(C=CC(=C1)C2(C3=CC=CC=C3C(=O)O2)C4=CC(=C(C=C4)O)C)O

Properties
Chemical formula	C_{22}H_{18}O_{4}
Molar mass	346.382 g·mol^{−1}
Appearance	White powder
Density	82.7 g/mL
Melting point	223 °C (433 °F; 496 K)
Boiling point	222.6 °C (432.68 °F; 495.75 K)
Solubility in water	Insoluble
Solubility	Soluble in ethanol
log P	1.975
Acidity (pK_{a})	9.61

Hazards
- GHS labelling
Pictograms	(GHS07: Exclamation mark) (GHS08: Health hazard)
Signal word	Warning
Hazard statements	H302, H312, H315, H319, H332, H335, H351
Precautionary statements	P201, P202, P261, P264, P270, P271, P280, P281, P301+P312, P302+P352, P304+P312, P304+P340, P305+P351+P338, P308+P313, P312, P321, P322, P330, P332+P313, P337+P313, P362, P363, P403+P233, P405, P501

Related compounds
Related compounds	Phenolphthalein; Thymolphthalein
- Except where otherwise noted, data are given for materials in their standard state (at 25 °C [77 °F], 100 kPa). Infobox references

Cresolphthalein (pH indicator)
below pH 8.2		above pH 9.8
(colorless) 8.2	⇌	9.8 (purple)

o-Cresolphthalein is a phthalein dye used as a pH indicator in titrations. It is insoluble in water but soluble in ethanol. Its solution is colourless below pH 8.2, and purple above 9.8. Its molecular formula is C_{22}H_{18}O_{4}. It is used medically to determine calcium levels in the human body, or to synthesize polyamides or polyimides.

== Production ==
o-Cresolphthalein is not produced industrially, rather, it is commercially available. To be produced, the method generally used to synthesize phthalein dyes is effective. This method is used to synthesize phenolphthalein and thymolphthalein. To begin, a 2M equivalent of a phenol or a substituted phenol should be combined with a 1M equivalent of a phthalic anhydride.

== Uses ==
The compound has uses ranging from medicine to laboratory syntheses of chemically similar compounds. o-Cresophthalein has been used to derive polyamides and polyimides, colorimetrically estimate calcium in serum, and predict amount of time to wait before blood collection after a patient receives gadodiamide.

=== Deriving Polyamides and Polyimides ===
Aromatic polyamides and polyamides are practical compounds due to their temperature resistance, electrical or insulating characteristics, and their mechanical strength. Some of the polyamides and polyimides that can be synthesized by o-Cresophthalein are polycarbonate, polyacrylate, and epoxy-resin.

The diether-diamine 3,3-bis[4-(4-amino-phenoxy)-3-methylphenyl]phthalide, or BNMP, is synthesized by 12 g o-cresophthalein, 11.5 g p-chloronitrobenzene, 5.1 g anhydrous potassium carbonate, and 55 mL of DMF. The compounds should be refluxed together at 160 °C for eight hours. Once it is done and has cooled, it should be mixed with 0.3 L methanol. A precipitate should form and be vacuum filtered to obtain a solid. It should then be washed with water and dried, yielding a yellow product. It should then be recrystallized from glacial acetic acid to yield yellow needles. The product is BNMP. The reaction can go further by combining 15.5 g of BNMP with 0.18 g 10% Pd/C and 50 mL ethanol. They should be stirred at 80 °C. 7 mL of hydrazine monohydrate should be added drop by drop for one hour. The solution should then be mixed for eight hours. It should then be filtered to separated from the Pd/C and concentrated. The concentrated solution should be added to water, and a precipitate should be formed. It should then be vacuum filtered to isolate the solid, yelding 3,3-Bis[4-(4-aminophenoxy)-3-methylphenyl]pthalide, or BAMP, as a white solid. It should then be purified by water and ethanol.

=== Colorimetric Estimation of Calcium in Serum ===
Calcium in a blood sample should be estimated when required medically. Calcium should be precipitated out of 0.1 mL of the blood sample serum as calcium oxalate. After that, the decomposition of the calcium oxalate should occur by heat. Then, the sample should be estimated colorimetrically by o-cresolphthalein complexone. The required liquid complexone is made by dissolving 10 mg o-cresolphthalein complexone in 50 mL alkaline borate, and then 50 mL of 0.05 N HCl are added to make the solution's pH 8.5. This method for calcium determination is efficient and effective, requiring a minimal amount of blood serum sample and a reasonable amount of time.

=== Determination of Impact of Gadodiamide on Calcium Measurements ===
Gadolinium is given to patients for magnetic resonance imaging, or an MRI.It is used as a contrast agent for the exam to improve clarity of the images formed. However, it can react in the human body and have detrimental effects. Therefore, the agent should be removed. One of these gadolinium based agents is gadodiamide. Calcium in the body should be determined accurately to ensure that the Gadodiamide does not have adverse effects on the patient. There are two o-cresolphthalein methods to determine amount of calcium. The o-cresolpthalein methods are effective because it is a calcium binding dye. The gadolinium ion with a charge of +3 can be removed from gadodiamide using o-cresolphthalein. For these methods, glomerular filtration rate, or GFR, and time since gadodiamide was given should be recorded. Ultimately, these two factors and the impact of gadodiamide on calcium levels calculated by the o-cresolphthalein method helps to reveal an amount of time that patients must wait after receiving gadodiamide to have blood drawn again, or avoid pseudohypocalcemia.

== Safety ==
=== NFPA Diamond ===
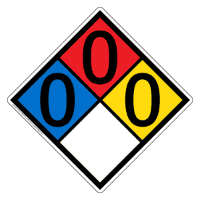

To the left is the NFPA diamond as determined by the Safety Data Sheet, or SDS, by Fisher Scientific. There is minimal risk in handling the chemical.
