= TanSat =

Chinese observation satellite

- Names: CarbonSat
- Mission type: Earth observation
- Operator: MOST
- COSPAR ID: 2016-081A
- SATCAT no.: 41898
- Mission duration: Planned: 3 years Elapsed: 9 years, 10 months, 24 days

Spacecraft properties
- Manufacturer: SIMIT
- Launch mass: 620 kg (1,370 lb)
- Dry mass: 610 kg (1,340 lb)
- Dimensions: 150 × 180 × 185 cm (59 × 71 × 73 in)

Start of mission
- Launch date: 21 December 2016, 19:22 UTC
- Rocket: Long March 2D
- Launch site: Jiuquan LC43/603
- Contractor: CASC

Orbital parameters
- Reference system: Geocentric
- Regime: Low Earth
- Semi-major axis: 7,083 km (4,401 mi)
- Eccentricity: 0.002272
- Perigee altitude: 688.9 km (428.1 mi)
- Apogee altitude: 721.1 km (448.1 mi)
- Inclination: 98.16°
- Period: 98.89 minutes
- Epoch: 12 February 2017, 19:47:39 UTC
Instruments
- CDS: Carbon Dioxide Spectrometer
- CAPI: Cloud and Aerosol Polarimetry Imager

TanSat, also known as CarbonSat, is a Chinese Earth observation satellite dedicated to monitoring carbon dioxide in Earth's atmosphere. It is generally classified as a minisatellite, and is the first dedicated carbon mission of the Chinese space program. The mission was formally proposed in 2010, and work began in January 2011. It is funded by the Ministry of Science and Technology (MOST) and was built by the Shanghai Institute of Microsystem And Information Technology (SIMIT).

TanSat carries two instruments: the Carbon Dioxide Spectrometer and the Cloud and Aerosol Polarimetry Imager. The Carbon Dioxide Spectrometer (CDS), also called CarbonSpec, is a high-resolution grating spectrometer which measures CO_{2} absorption at 1.61 μm and 2.06 μm, and O_{2} absorption in reflected sunlight at 0.76 μm. The Cloud and Aerosol Polarimetry Imager (CAPI) is a wide-field, moderate-resolution, imaging spectrometer which works in concert with CDS by compensating for measurement errors caused by clouds and aerosols. It makes observations in ultraviolet (0.38 μm), visible (0.67 μm), and near infrared (0.87 μm, 1.375 μm, and 1.64 μm).

In 2021, researchers published the first global carbon flux map derived from TanSat measurements, using a 15-month XCO2 record (March 2017 to May 2018) from the satellite's nadir observations. They estimated an integrated global land net carbon flux of 6.71 ± 0.76 Gt C per year for May 2017 to April 2018, which was generally consistent with inversions based on XCO2 data from Japan's GOSAT and NASA's OCO-2 satellites.

== See also ==
- Greenhouse Gases Observing Satellite
- Orbiting Carbon Observatory 2
- Space-based measurements of carbon dioxide
