= Integrated Carbon Observation System =

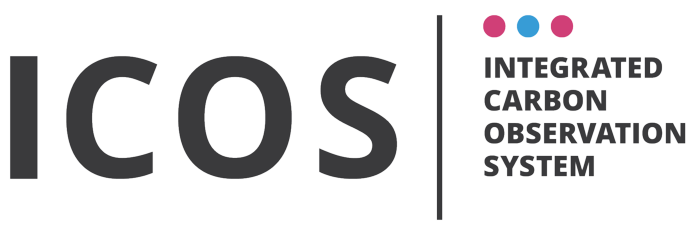
- Abbreviation: ICOS
- Formation: 2008
- Type: Research infrastructure
- Purpose: Greenhouse gas measurements
- Headquarters: Helsinki, Finland
- Key people: Hannele Laine (Director General)
- Website: Integrated Carbon Observation System

The Integrated Carbon Observation System (ICOS) is a research infrastructure to quantify the greenhouse gas balance of Europe and adjacent regions. In November 2015 it received the international legal status of ERIC (European Research Infrastructure Consortium) by decision of the European Commission. It is recognized by The European Strategy Forum on Research Infrastructures (ESFRI) as a landmark European research infrastructure. It consists of a harmonized network of almost 200 long-term observation sites for the domains of atmosphere, ecosystems and ocean. The network is coordinated through its Head Office, the central data portal and central facilities including an atmosphere, ecosystem and ocean thematic center, and central analytical laboratories.

ICOS provides the essential long-term observations required to understand the present state and predict future behavior of the global carbon cycle and greenhouse gas emissions. It monitors and assesses the effectiveness of carbon sequestration and/or greenhouse gases emission reduction activities on global atmospheric composition levels, including attribution of sources and sinks by region and sector.

The highly standardized network offers improved access to data and enables the development of flux products for research and political application. ICOS is a state-of-the-art facility for the European research community. It contributes to the European share of global greenhouse gas observations under Group on Earth Observations (GEO), World Meteorological Organization GAW and GCOS programs.

== Mission and goals ==
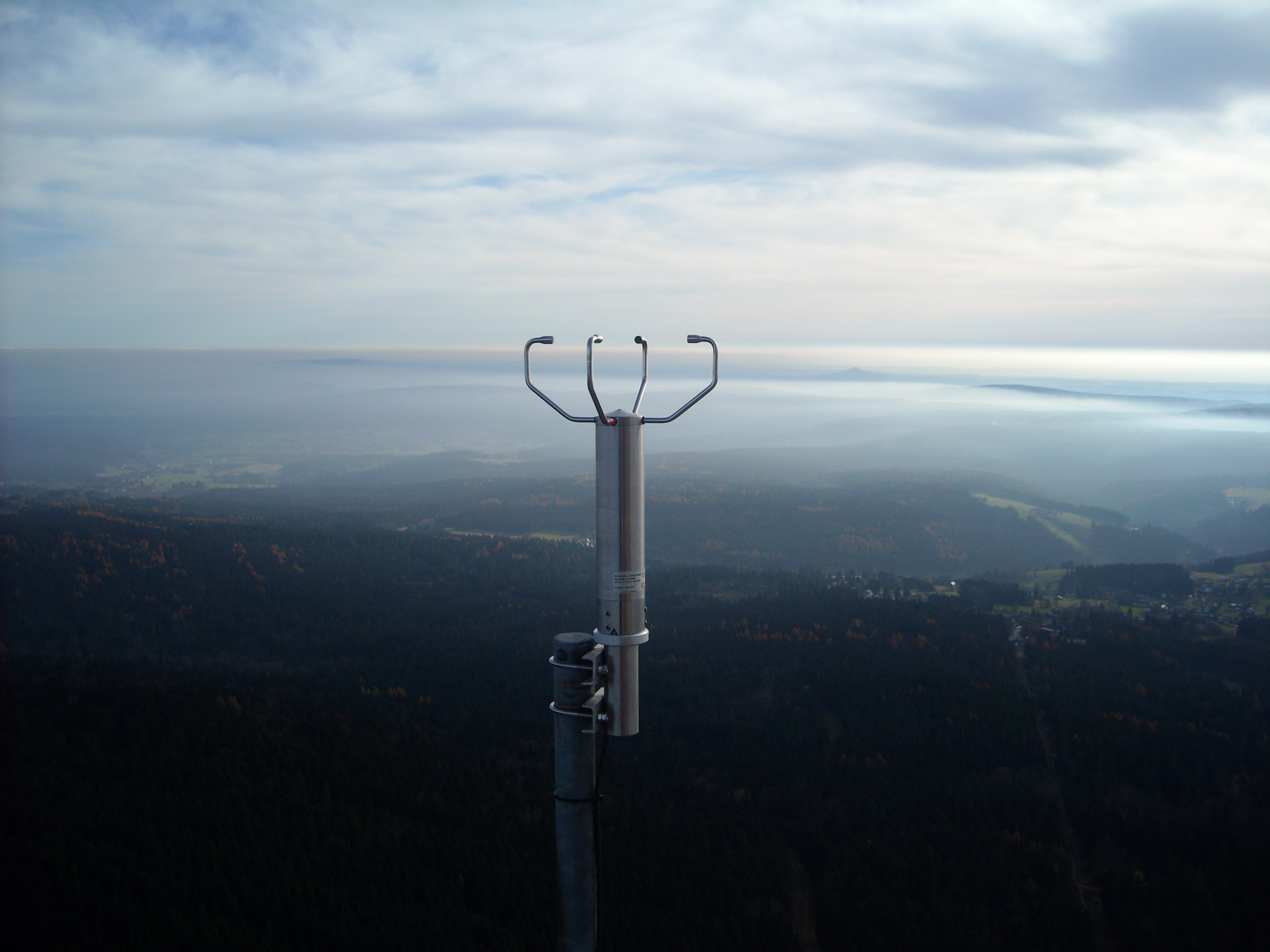
ICOS Atmosphere station

ICOS consists of a network of standardized, long-term, high-precision integrated monitoring of atmospheric greenhouse gas concentrations and fluxes. The infrastructure integrates terrestrial and atmospheric observations at various sites into a single, coherent, highly precise dataset. This data allows a unique regional top-down assessment of fluxes from atmospheric data, and a bottom-up assessment from ecosystem measurements and fossil fuel inventories. Target is a daily mapping of sources and sinks at scales down to about 10 km, as a basis for understanding the exchange processes between the atmosphere, the terrestrial surface and the ocean. ICOS contributes to the implementation of the Integrated Global Carbon Observation System IGCO.

== Impact ==
The synergy between the atmospheric concentration measurements, the knowledge of local ecosystem fluxes on the other hand, has shown effective in reducing the uncertainties on carbon assessments. However, in Europe, observatories are all managed differently for each country and data is not homogeneously processed. The value added impact of the infrastructure allows an enhanced visibility and dissemination of European greenhouse gas data and products that are both long-term and carefully calibrated. ICOS meets the data needs of carbon cycle and climate researchers as well as those of politicians and the general public. ICOS serves as the backbone to users engaged in developing data assimilation models of greenhouse gas sources and sinks, namely reverse modelling, which allows the deduction of surface carbon flux pattern.

A common data centre, the ICOS Carbon Portal, provides free access to all ICOS data, as well as to links with inventory data, and outreach material. This portal allows the production of web based tools for the survey of sources and sinks in near real-time. ICOS delivers the information in near real-time with a quantification of the uncertainty associated with the results due to the use of several different models using different methodologies.

ICOS enables Europe to be a key global player for in-situ observations of greenhouse gases, data processing and user-friendly access to data products for validation of remote sensing products, scientific assessments, modelling and data assimilation.

== Current status ==
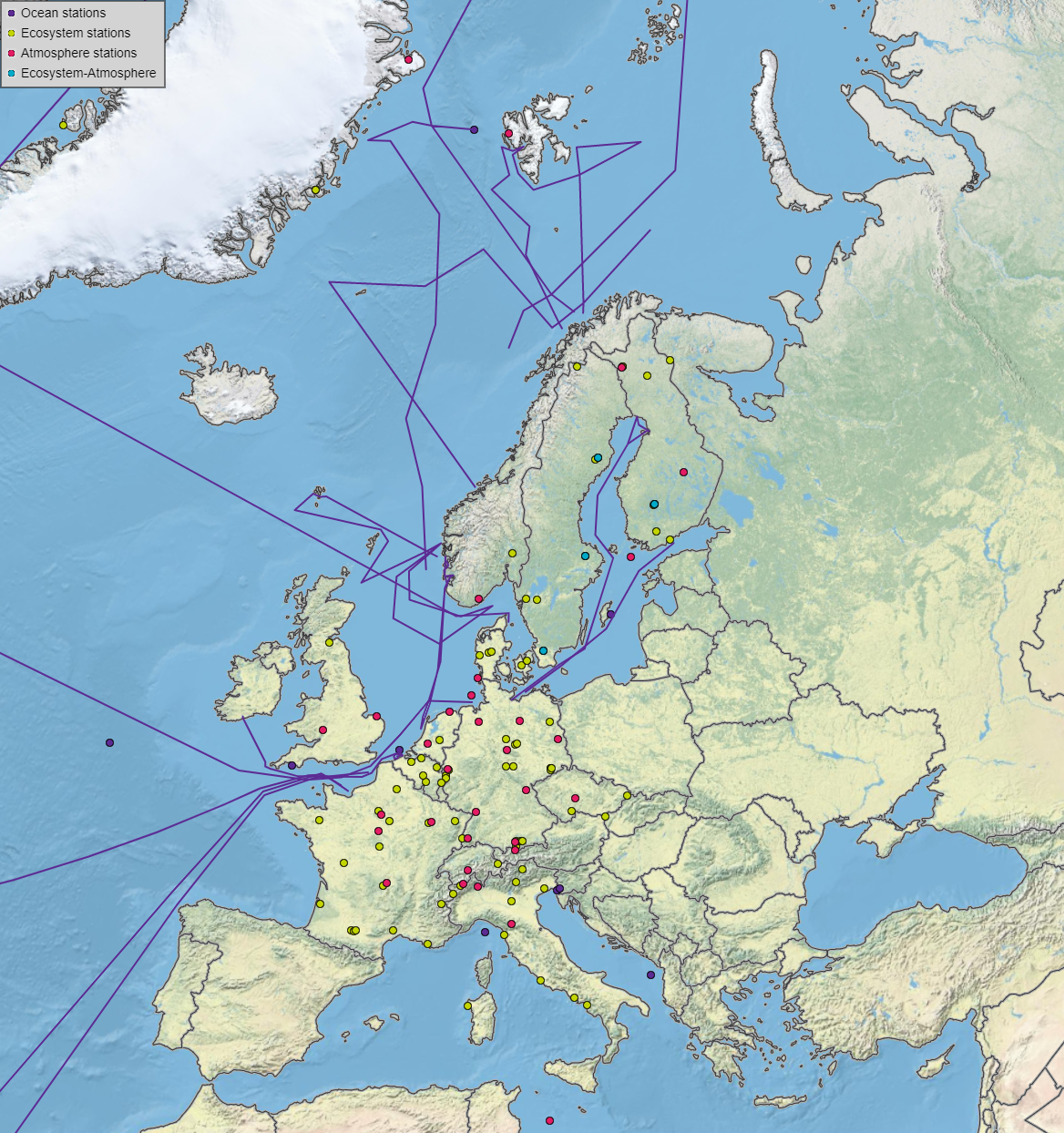
ICOS Station Map (March 2021)

ICOS has currently 16 member states and is in operational mode, with stations being certified for the operation according to the strict protocols and quality parameters. By the end of 2024 ICOS had 138 out of the 179 stations certified ('labelled' as either Class 1,2 or associated station), with greenhouse gas concentrations and fluxes determined on a routine basis.

ICOS member states

- Belgium
- Czech Republic
- Denmark
- Finland
- France
- Germany
- Greece
- Hungary
- Ireland
- Italy
- Netherlands
- Norway
- Spain
- Sweden
- Switzerland
- United Kingdom of Great Britain and Northern Ireland

== See also ==
- Climate change
- Keeling Curve
