= Trace gas =

Gases apart from nitrogen, oxygen, and argon in Earth's atmosphere

Trace gases are gases that are present in small amounts within an environment such as a planet's atmosphere. Trace gases in Earth's atmosphere are gases other than nitrogen (78.1%), oxygen (20.9%), and argon (0.934%) which, in combination, make up 99.934% of its atmosphere (not including water vapor).

== Abundance, sources and sinks ==
The abundance of a trace gas can range from a few parts per trillion (ppt) by volume to several hundred parts per million by volume (ppmv). When a trace gas is added into the atmosphere, that process is called a source. There are two possible types of sources - natural or anthropogenic. Natural sources are caused by processes that occur in nature. In contrast, anthropogenic sources are caused by human activity.

Some sources of a trace gas are biogenic processes, outgassing from solid Earth, ocean emissions, industrial emissions, and in situ formation. A few examples of biogenic sources include photosynthesis, animal excrements, termites, rice paddies, and wetlands. Volcanoes are the main source for trace gases from solid earth. The global ocean is also a source of several trace gases, in particular sulfur-containing gases. In situ trace gas formation occurs through chemical reactions in the gas-phase. Anthropogenic sources are caused by human related activities such as fossil fuel combustion (e.g. in transportation), fossil fuel mining, biomass burning, and industrial activity.

In contrast, a sink is when a trace gas is removed from the atmosphere. Some of the sinks of trace gases are chemical reactions in the atmosphere, mainly with the OH radical, gas-to-particle conversion forming aerosols, wet deposition and dry deposition. Other sinks include microbiological activity in soils.

Below is a chart of several trace gases including their abundances, atmospheric lifetimes, sources, and sinks.

Trace gases – taken at pressure 1 atm

Gas	Chemical formula	Fraction of volume of air by the species	Residence time or lifetime	Major sources	Major sinks
Carbon dioxide	CO_{2}	419 ppm ≈ppmv (May, 2021)	Increasing, See Note^{[A]}	Biological, oceanic, combustion, anthropogenic	photosynthesis
Neon	Ne	18.18 ppmv	_________	Volcanic	________
Helium	He	5.24 ppmv	_________	Radiogenic	________
Methane	CH_{4}	1.89 ppm (May, 2021)	9 years	Biological, anthropogenic	OH
Hydrogen	H_{2}	0.56 ppmv	~ 2 years	Biological, HCHO photolysis	soil uptake
Nitrous oxide	N_{2}O	0.33 ppmv	150 years	Biological, anthropogenic	O(^{1}D) in stratosphere
Carbon monoxide	CO	40 – 200 ppbv	~ 60 days	Photochemical, combustion, anthropogenic	OH
Ozone	O_{3}	10 – 200 ppbv (troposphere)	Days – months	Photochemical	photolysis
Formaldehyde	HCHO	0.1 – 10 ppbv	~ 1.5 hours	Photochemical	OH, photolysis
Nitrogen species	NO_{x}	10 pptv – 1 ppmv	Variable	Soils, anthropogenic, lightning	OH
Ammonia	NH_{3}	10 pptv – 1 ppbv	2 – 10 days	Biological	gas-to-particle conversion
Sulfur dioxide	SO_{2}	10 pptv – 1 ppbv	Days	Photochemical, volcanic, anthropogenic	OH, water-based oxidation
Dimethyl sulfide	(CH_{3})_{2}S	several pptv – several ppbv	Days	Biological, ocean	OH

^{A} The Intergovernmental Panel on Climate Change (IPCC) states that "no single atmospheric lifetime can be given" for CO_{2}. This is mostly due to the high rate of growth and large cumulative magnitude of the disturbances to Earth's carbon cycle by the geologic extraction and burning of fossil carbon. As of year 2014, fossil CO_{2} emitted as a theoretical 10 to 100 GtC pulse on top of the existing atmospheric concentration was expected to be 50% removed by land vegetation and ocean sinks in less than about a century. A substantial fraction (20-35%) was also projected to remain in the atmosphere for centuries to millennia, where fractional persistence increases with pulse size. Thus CO_{2} lifetime effectively increases as more fossil carbon is extracted by humans.

== Mixing and lifetime ==
The overall abundance of man-made trace gases in Earth's atmosphere is growing. Most originate from industrial activity in the more populated northern hemisphere. Time-series data from measurement stations around the world indicate that it typically takes 1–2 years for their concentrations to become well-mixed throughout the troposphere.

The residence time of a trace gas depends on the abundance and rate of removal. The Junge (empirical) relationship describes the relationship between concentration fluctuations and residence time of a gas in the atmosphere. It can expressed as fc = b/τ_{r}, where fc is the coefficient of variation, τ_{r} is the residence time in years, and b is an empirical constant, which Junge originally gave as 0.14 years. As residence time increases, the concentration variability decreases. This implies that the most reactive gases have the most concentration variability because of their shorter lifetimes. In contrast, more inert gases are non-variable and have longer lifetimes. When measured far from their sources and sinks, the relationship can be used to estimate tropospheric residence times of gases.

== Trace greenhouse gases ==
A few examples of the major greenhouse gases are water, carbon dioxide, methane, nitrous oxide, ozone, and CFCs. These gases can absorb infrared radiation from the Earth's surface as it passes through the atmosphere.

The most influential greenhouse gas is water vapor. It frequently occurs in high concentrations, may transition to and from an aerosol (clouds), and is thus not generally classified as a trace gas. Regionally, water vapor can trap up to 80 percent of outgoing IR radiation. Globally, water vapor is responsible for about half of Earth's total greenhouse effect.

The second most important greenhouse gas, and the most important trace gas affected by man-made sources, is carbon dioxide. It contributes about 20% of Earth's total greenhouse effect. The reason that greenhouse gases can absorb infrared radiation is their molecular structure. For example, carbon dioxide has two basic modes of vibration that create a strong dipole moment, which causes its strong absorption of infrared radiation.

In contrast, the most abundant gases (N_{2},O_{2}, and Ar) in the atmosphere are not greenhouse gases. This is because they cannot absorb infrared radiation as they do not have vibrations with a dipole moment. For instance, the triple bonds of atmospheric dinitrogen make for a symmetric molecule with vibrational energy states that are almost totally unaffected at infrared frequencies.

Below is a table of some of the major trace greenhouse gases, their man-made sources, and an estimate of the relative contribution of those sources to the enhanced greenhouse effect that influences global warming.

Key Greenhouse Gases and Sources

Gas	Chemical formula	Major human sources	Contribution to Increase (Year 1995 estimate)
Carbon dioxide	CO_{2}	fossil fuel combustion, deforestation	55%
Methane	CH_{4}	rice fields, cattle and dairy cows, landfills, oil and gas production	15%
Nitrous oxide	N_{2}O	fertilizers, deforestation	6%
