= Greenhouse Gases Observing Satellite =

Japanese Earth observation satellite

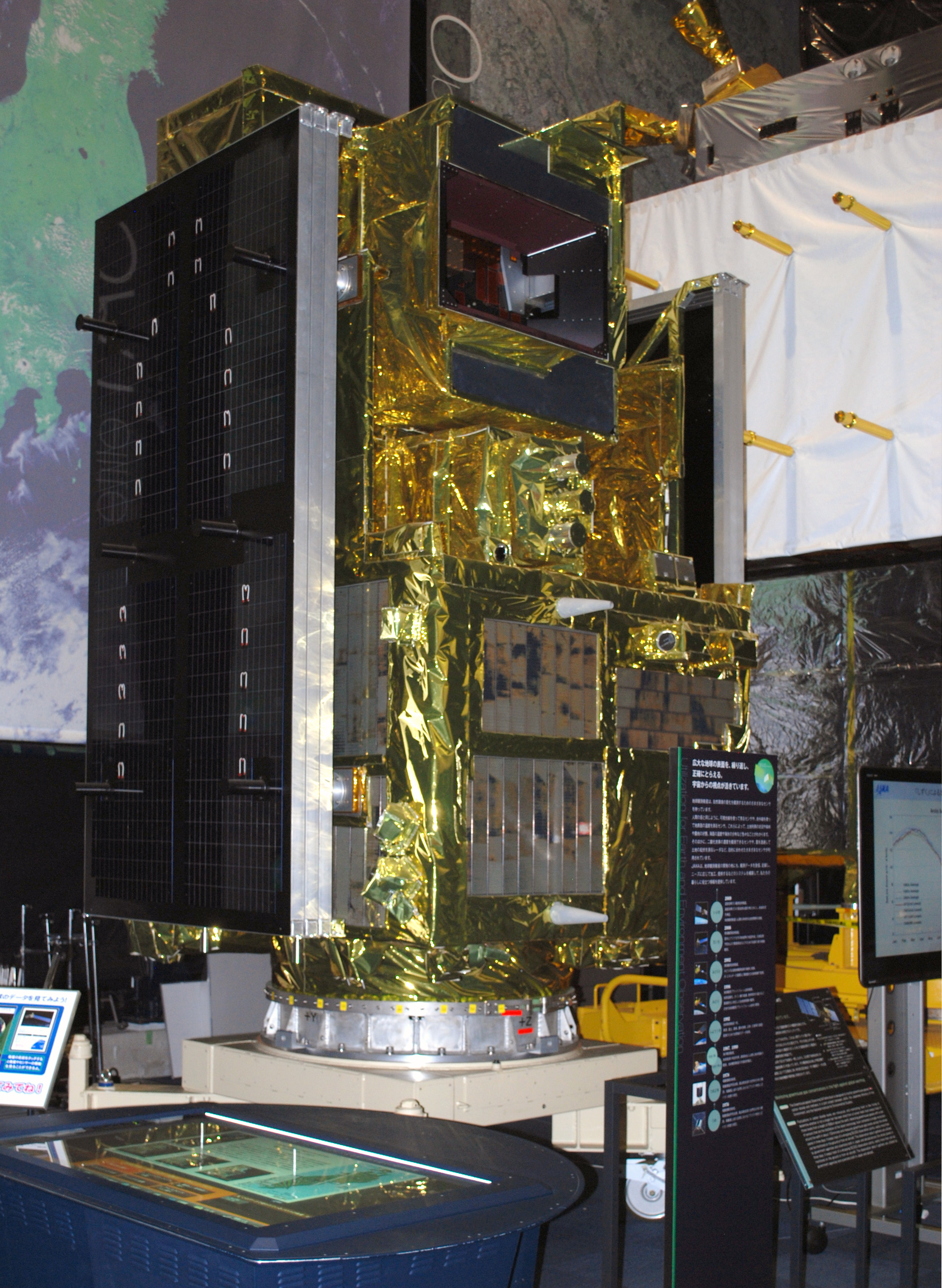
- Model of GOSAT at Tsukuba Space Center Space Dome
- Names: Ibuki
- Mission type: Environmental
- Operator: JAXA
- COSPAR ID: 2009-002A
- SATCAT no.: 33492
- Website: global.jaxa.jp/projects/sat/gosat/index.html
- Mission duration: 5 years (planned); Elapsed: 16 years, 10 months, 21 days

Spacecraft properties
- Manufacturer: Mitsubishi Electric
- Launch mass: 1,750 kilograms (3,860 lb)
- Power: 3.8 kilowatts

Start of mission
- Launch date: 23 January 2009, 03:54 UTC
- Rocket: H-IIA-202 F15
- Launch site: Tanegashima, Yoshinobu 1
- Contractor: Mitsubishi Heavy Industries

Orbital parameters
- Reference system: Geocentric
- Regime: Low Earth
- Perigee altitude: 674 kilometres (419 mi)
- Apogee altitude: 676 kilometres (420 mi)
- Inclination: 98.06°
- Period: 98.12 minutes
- Mean motion: 14.68
- Epoch: 25 January 2015, 03:12:11 UTC

Main Instrument
- Wavelengths: 12900 - 13200 cm^{−1}/ 5800 - 6400 cm^{−1}/ 4800 - 5200 cm^{−1}/ 700 - 1800 cm^{−1}(FTS)
- Resolution: 0.2 cm^{−1} (FTS)

Instruments
- TANSO-FTS - Infrared Fourier Transform Spectrometer; TANSO-CAI - Thermal and Near-Infrared Sensor

Greenhouse Gases Observing Satellite (GOSAT), also known as Ibuki (Japanese: いぶき, Hepburn: Ibuki; meaning "breath"), is an Earth observation satellite and the world's first satellite dedicated to greenhouse gas monitoring. It measures the densities of carbon dioxide and methane from 56,000 locations on the Earth's atmosphere. The GOSAT was developed by the Japan Aerospace Exploration Agency (JAXA) and launched on 23 January 2009, from the Tanegashima Space Center. Japan's Ministry of the Environment, and the National Institute for Environmental Studies (NIES) use the data to track gases causing the greenhouse effect, and share the data with NASA and other international scientific organizations.

== Launch ==
GOSAT was launched along with seven other piggyback probes using the H-IIA, Japan's primary large-scale expendable launch system, at 3:54 am on 23 January 2009 UTC on Tanegashima, a small island in southern Japan, after a two-day delay due to unfavourable weather. At approximately 16 minutes after liftoff, the separation of Ibuki from the launch rocket was confirmed.

== Instruments ==
According to JAXA, the Ibuki satellite is equipped with a greenhouse gas observation sensor (TANSO-FTS) and a cloud/aerosol sensor (TANSO-CAI) that supplements TANSO-FTS. The greenhouse gas observation sensor of Ibuki observes a wide range of wavelengths (near-infrared region–thermal infrared region) within the infrared band to enhance observation accuracy. The satellite uses a spectrometer to measure different elements and compounds based on their response to certain types of light. This technology allows the satellite to measure "the concentration of greenhouse gases in the atmosphere at a super-high resolution."

== GOSAT-2 ==
The Greenhouse Gases Observing Satellite-2 was launched from Tanegashima Space Center by a H-IIA rocket on October 29, 2018.

== See also ==
- Orbiting Carbon Observatory 2
- TanSat
- Space-based Measurements of Carbon Dioxide
