= Orbiting Carbon Observatory 2 =

NASA climate satellite

Orbiting Carbon Observatory-2 (OCO-2)
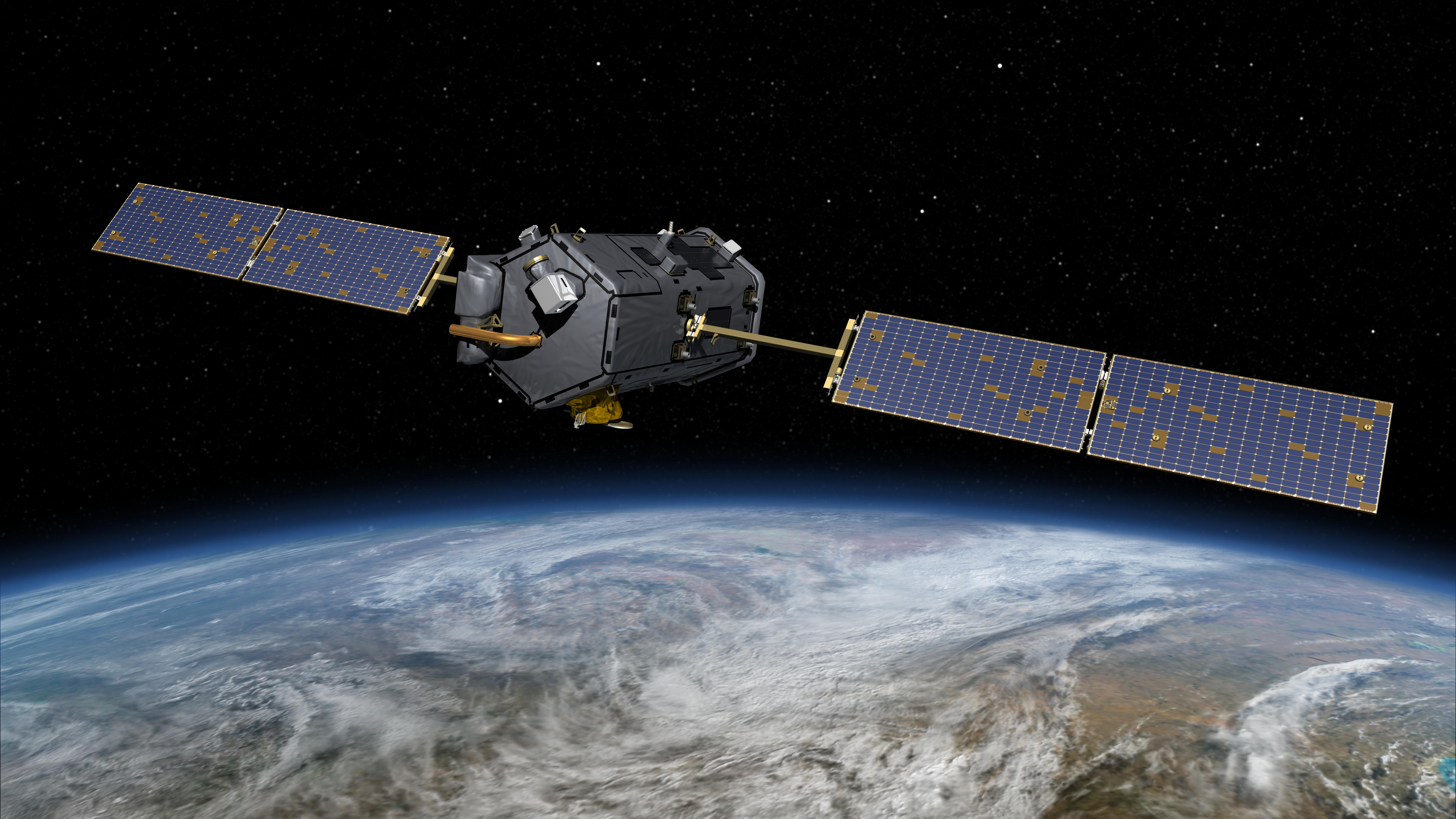
- Artist depiction of OCO-2
- Mission type: Climatology
- Operator: NASA
- COSPAR ID: 2014-035A
- SATCAT no.: 40059
- Website: JPL OCO-2 Mission
- Mission duration: 2 years (nominal); Elapsed: 12 years, 2 months, 24 days

Spacecraft properties
- Bus: LEOStar-2
- Manufacturer: Orbital Sciences
- Launch mass: 454 kg (1,001 lb)
- Dry mass: 315 kg (694 lb)
- Payload mass: 131 kg (289 lb)
- Dimensions: Stowed: 2.12 × 0.94 m (6.96 × 3.08 ft)
- Power: 815 W

Start of mission
- Launch date: 2 July 2014, 09:56:23 UTC
- Rocket: Delta II 7320-10C
- Launch site: Vandenberg, SLC-2W
- Contractor: United Launch Alliance

Orbital parameters
- Reference system: Geocentric
- Regime: Sun-synchronous
- Perigee altitude: 701.10 km (435.64 mi)
- Apogee altitude: 703.81 km (437.33 mi)
- Inclination: 98.2°
- Period: 98.82 minutes
- Mean motion: 14.57 rev / day
- Velocity: 7.5 km/s (4.7 mi/s)
- Epoch: 19 September 2016, 10:55:06 UTC
- Revolution no.: 11,796

Main telescope
- Type: Near-IR Cassegrain
- Focal ratio: ƒ/1.8
- Wavelengths: 2.06 microns 1.61 microns 0.765 microns

Instruments
- 3 grating spectrometers
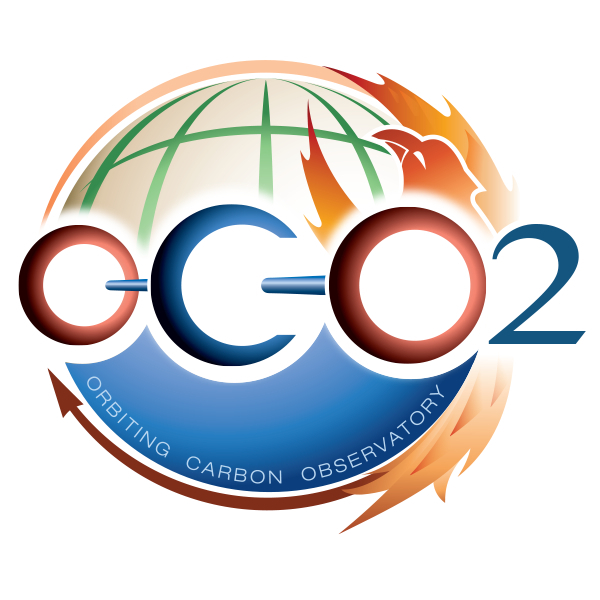

Orbiting Carbon Observatory-2 (OCO-2) is an American environmental science satellite that measures carbon dioxide and plant growth on Earth. Launched on 2 July 2014 as a NASA mission, it is a replacement for the Orbiting Carbon Observatory, which was lost in a launch failure in 2009. It is the second successful high-precision (better than 0.3%) CO_{2} observing satellite, after GOSAT.

== Mission overview ==
The OCO-2 satellite was built by Orbital Sciences Corporation, based around the LEOStar-2 bus. The spacecraft is being used to study carbon dioxide concentrations and distributions in the atmosphere.

OCO-2 was ordered after the original OCO spacecraft failed to achieve orbit. During the first satellite's launch atop a Taurus-XL in February 2009, the payload fairing failed to separate from around the spacecraft and the rocket did not have sufficient power to enter orbit with its additional mass. Although a Taurus launch was initially contracted for the reflight, the launch contract was cancelled after the same malfunction occurred on the launch of the Glory satellite two years later.

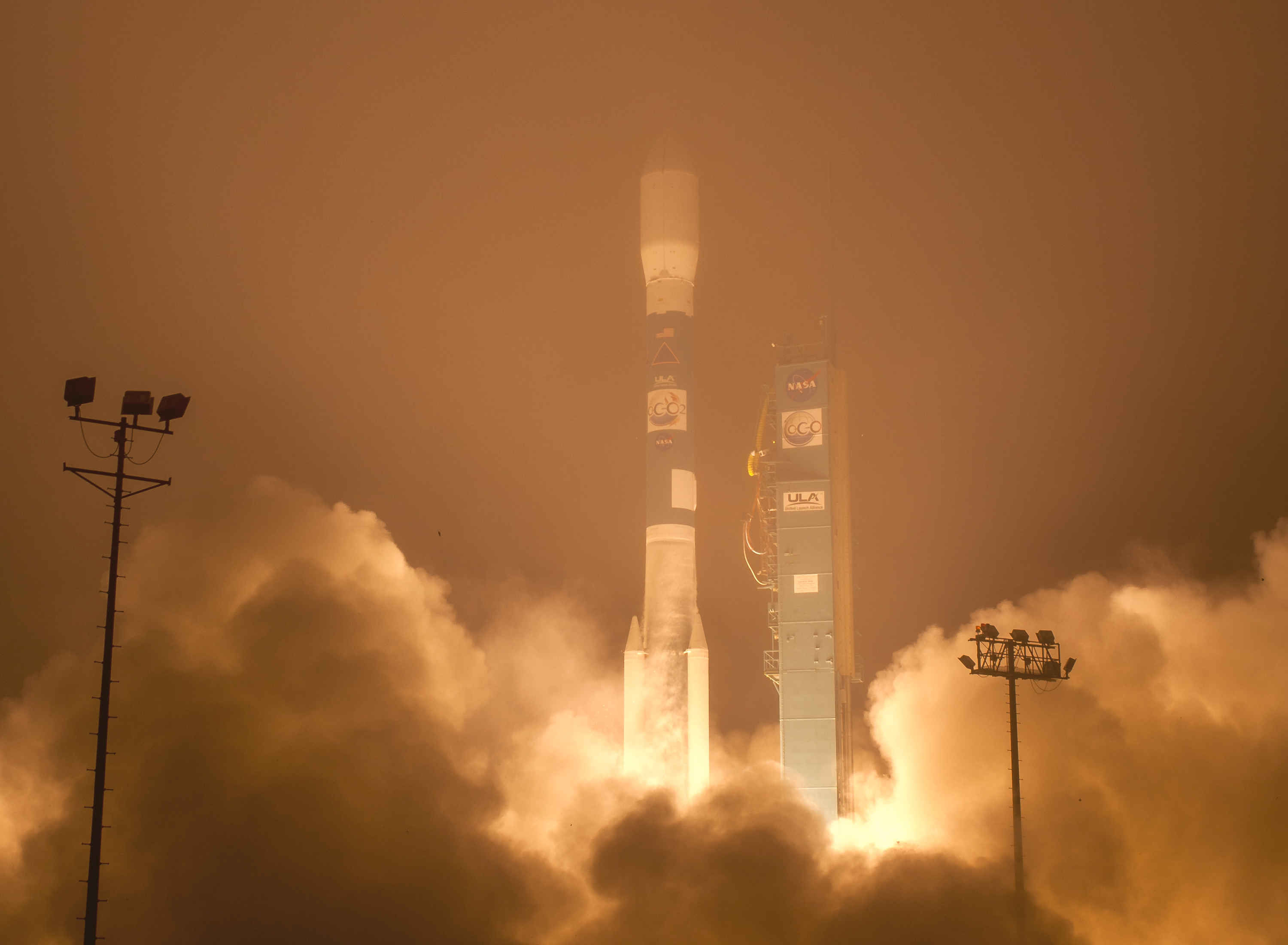
The launch of OCO-2 on a Delta II rocket.

United Launch Alliance launched OCO-2 using a Delta II rocket at the beginning of a 30-second launch window at 09:56 UTC (2:56 PDT) on 2 July 2014. Flying in the 7320-10C configuration, the rocket launched from Space Launch Complex 2W at Vandenberg Air Force Base. The initial launch attempt on 1 July at 09:56:44 UTC was scrubbed at 46 seconds on the countdown clock due to a faulty valve on the water suppression system, used to flow water on the launch pad to dampen the acoustic energy during launch. As of 2014, the mission is expected to cost US$467.7 million, including design, development, launch and operations.

OCO-2 joined the A-train satellite constellation, becoming the sixth satellite in the group. Members of the A-train fly very close together in Sun-synchronous orbit, to make nearly simultaneous measurements of Earth. A particularly short launch window of 30 seconds was necessary to achieve a proper position in the train. As of 19 September 2016, it was in an orbit with a perigee of 701.10 km (435.64 mi), an apogee of 703.81 km (437.33 mi) and a 98.2° inclination.

In 2025, the Trump administration requested NASA to formulate plans to terminate this mission.

In August 2026, NASA selected Caltech to operate both Orbiting Carbon Observatories - OCO-2 and OCO-3 for up to five years. NASA would remain owner for both the missions, while Caltech would operate the missions and science data systems, including creating new data products.

== Column CO_{2} measurements ==
A Mollweide projected time lapse of CO_{2} concentrations from the OCO-2 mission, September 2014 to August 2015.

OCO-2 is one of only two federal satellite missions that are designed specifically to monitor planet-warming greenhouse gases.

Rather than directly measuring concentrations of carbon dioxide in the atmosphere, OCO-2 records how much of the sunlight reflected off the Earth is absorbed by CO_{2} molecules in an air column. OCO-2 makes measurements in three different spectral bands over four to eight different footprints of approximately 1.29 km × 2.25 km (0.80 mi × 1.40 mi) each. About 24 soundings are collected per second while in sunlight and over 10% of these are sufficiently cloud free for further analysis. One spectral band is used for column measurements of oxygen (A-band 0.765 microns), and two are used for column measurements of carbon dioxide (weak band 1.61 microns, strong band 2.06 microns).

In the retrieval algorithm measurements from the three bands are combined to yield column-averaged dry-air mole fractions of carbon dioxide. Because these are dry-air mole fractions, these measurements do not change with water content or surface pressure. Because the molecular oxygen content of the atmosphere (i.e. excluding the oxygen in water vapour) is well known to be 20.95%, oxygen is used as a measure of the total dry air column. To ensure these measurements are traceable to the World Meteorological Organization, OCO-2 measurements are carefully compared with measurements by the Total Carbon Column Observing Network (TCCON).

== Data products ==
Mission data are provided to the public by the NASA Goddard Earth Science Data and Information Services Center (GES DISC). The Level 1B data product is the least processed and contains records for all collected soundings (about 74,000 soundings per orbit). The Level 2 product contains estimates of the column-averaged dry-air mole fractions of carbon dioxide, among other parameters such as surface albedo and aerosol content. The Level 3 product consists of global maps of carbon dioxide concentrations developed by OCO-2 scientists.

== See also ==
- Space-based measurements of carbon dioxide
- Orbiting Carbon Observatory 3
- Greenhouse Gases Observing Satellite
- TanSat
