= National Institute for Environmental Studies =

Japanese research institute

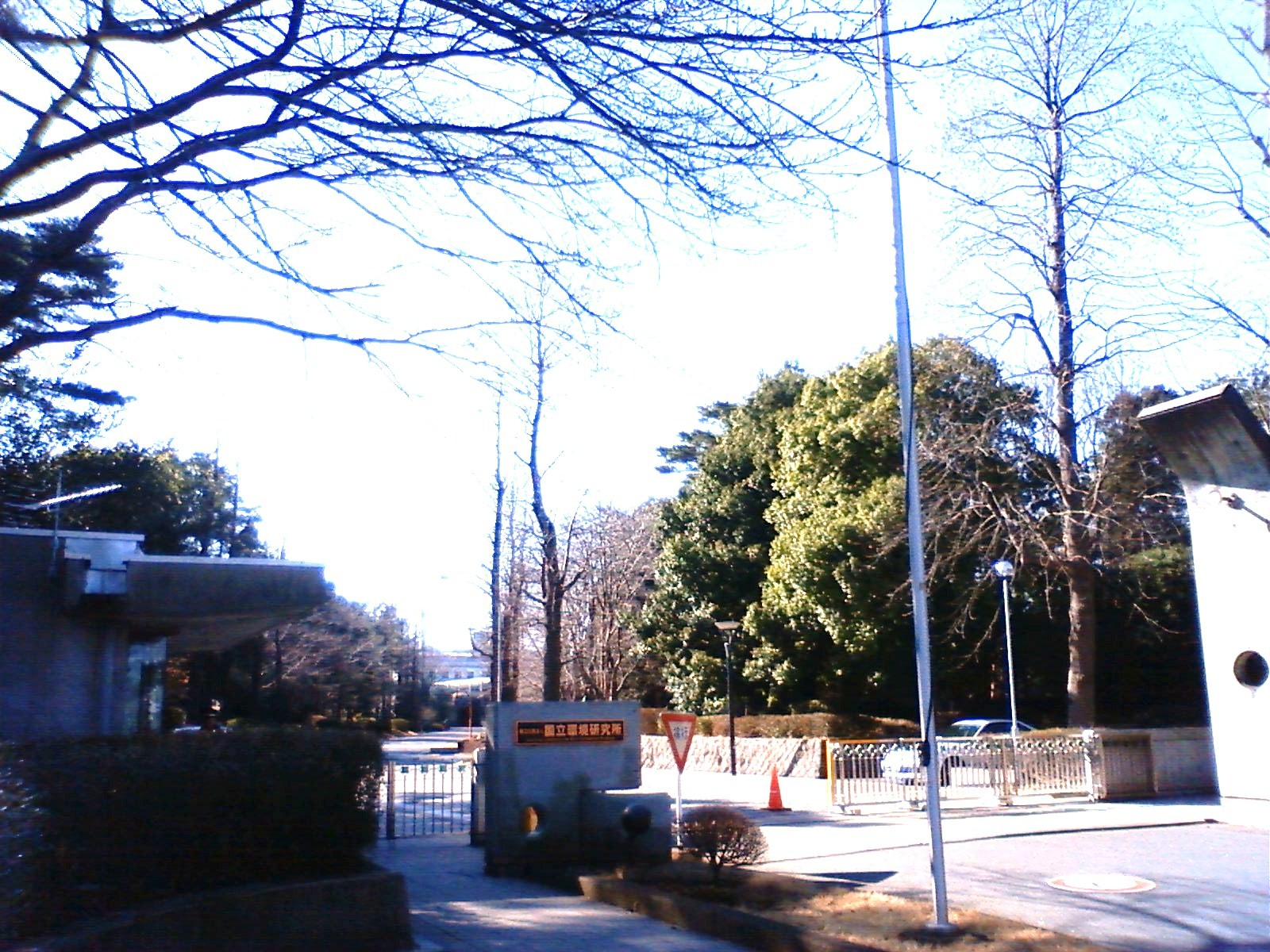
- Type: Independent Administrative Institution
- Established: 2001
- President: Shin'ichirō Ōgaki
- Location: Tsukuba, Ibaraki, Japan
- Website: www.nies.go.jp/index-e.html

The National Institute for Environmental Studies (Japanese: 国立環境研究所, Hepburn: Kokuritsu-Kankyō Kenkyūsho; NIES) was established in 1974 as a focal point for environmental research in Japan. In 2001 it became an Independent Administrative Institution. NIES is organised into eight centers, each of which is subdivided into a further number of sections responsible for different specializations within the broader field to which they belong. The eight centers are responsible for research in eight different fields, with programs dedicated to these research areas.

== History ==
July 1971 Environment Agency established

November 1971 NIES Founding Committee established

March 1974 National Institute for Environmental Studies established

April 1985 Emperor Showa visits NIES

July 1990 Restructuring of NIES to include global environmental research

October 1990 Center for Global Environmental Research established

January 2001 Environment Agency becomes Ministry of the Environment. Waste Management Division established at NIES

April 2001 NIES established as an incorporated administrative agency. First five-year plan (2001–2005) commences

== See also ==
- List of Independent Administrative Institutes in Japan
