= Greenhouse gas =

Heat-trapping gas in an atmosphere

Greenhouse gases trap some of the heat that results when sunlight heats the Earth's surface. Three important greenhouse gases are shown symbolically in this image: carbon dioxide, water vapor, and methane.

Physical drivers of global warming that has happened so far. Future global warming potential for long-lived drivers like carbon dioxide emissions is not represented. Whiskers on each bar show the possible error range.

Greenhouse gases (GHGs) are the gases in an atmosphere that trap heat, raising the surface temperature of astronomical bodies such as Earth. Unlike other gases, greenhouse gases absorb the radiations that a planet emits, resulting in the greenhouse effect. The Earth is warmed by sunlight, causing its surface to radiate heat, which is then mostly absorbed by greenhouse gases. Without greenhouse gases in the atmosphere, the average temperature of Earth's surface would be about −18 °C (0 °F), rather than the present average of 15 °C (59 °F). Human-induced warming has been increasing at an unprecedented rate since it has started being measured, reaching 0.27±0.1 °C per decade over 2015–2024. This high rate of warming is caused by a combination of greenhouse gas emissions being at an all-time high of 53.6±5.2 Gt CO2e per year over the last decade (2014–2023), as well as reductions in the strength of aerosol cooling.

The five most abundant greenhouse gases in Earth's atmosphere, listed in decreasing order of average global mole fraction, are: water vapor, carbon dioxide, methane, nitrous oxide, ozone. Other greenhouse gases of concern include chlorofluorocarbons (CFCs and HCFCs), hydrofluorocarbons (HFCs), perfluorocarbons, SF_{6}, and NF_{3}. Water vapor causes about half of the greenhouse effect, acting in response to other gases as a climate change feedback.

Human activities since the beginning of the Industrial Revolution (around 1750) have increased carbon dioxide by over 50%, and methane levels by 150%. Carbon dioxide emissions are causing about three-quarters of global warming, while methane emissions cause most of the rest. The vast majority of carbon dioxide emissions by humans come from the burning of fossil fuels, with remaining contributions from agriculture and industry. Methane emissions originate from agriculture, fossil fuel production, waste, and other sources. The carbon cycle takes thousands of years to fully absorb CO_{2} from the atmosphere, while methane lasts in the atmosphere for an average of only 12 years.

Natural flows of carbon happen between the atmosphere, terrestrial ecosystems, the ocean, and sediments. These flows have been fairly balanced over the past one million years, although greenhouse gas levels have varied widely in the more distant past. Carbon dioxide levels are now higher than they have been for three million years. The 2023 annual update of key indicators reveals that human-induced temperature rise, greenhouse gas concentrations, and the Earth's energy imbalance have all reached new records. If current emission rates continue, then global warming will surpass 2.0 °C (3.6 °F) sometime between 2040 and 2070. This is a level which the Intergovernmental Panel on Climate Change (IPCC) says is "dangerous".

== Properties and mechanisms ==
Atmospheric absorption and scattering at different wavelengths of electromagnetic waves. The largest absorption band of carbon dioxide is not far from the maximum in the thermal emission from ground, and it partly closes the window of transparency of water—explaining carbon dioxide's major heat-trapping effect.

Greenhouse gases are infrared active, meaning that they absorb and emit infrared radiation in the same long wavelength range as what is emitted by the Earth's surface, clouds and atmosphere.

99% of the Earth's dry atmosphere (excluding water vapor) is made up of nitrogen (N_{2}) (78%) and oxygen (O_{2}) (21%). Because their molecules contain two atoms of the same element, they have no asymmetry in the distribution of their electrical charges, and so are almost totally unaffected by infrared thermal radiation, with only an extremely minor effect from collision-induced absorption. A further 0.9% of the atmosphere is made up by argon (Ar), which is monatomic, and so completely transparent to thermal radiation. On the other hand, carbon dioxide (0.04%), methane, nitrous oxide and even less abundant trace gases account for less than 0.1% of Earth's atmosphere, but because their molecules contain atoms of different elements, there is an asymmetry in electric charge distribution which allows molecular vibrations to interact with electromagnetic radiation. This makes them infrared active, and so their presence causes greenhouse effect.

=== Radiative forcing ===
Hansen et al. (2025) wrote that the IPCC had underestimated aerosols' cooling effect, causing it to also underestimate climate sensitivity (Earth's responsiveness to increases in greenhouse gas concentrations). In what Hansen called a Faustian bargain, regulation of aerosols improved air quality, but aerosols' cooling effect became inadequate to temper the increasing warming effect of greenhouse gases—explaining unexpectedly large global warming in 2023–2024.

Longwave-infrared absorption coefficients of primary greenhouse gases. Water vapor absorbs over a broad range of wavelengths. Earth emits thermal radiation particularly strongly in the vicinity of the carbon dioxide 15-micron absorption band. The relative importance of water vapor decreases with increasing altitude.

Earth absorbs some of the radiant energy received from the sun, reflects some of it as light, and reflects or radiates the rest back to space as heat. A planet's surface temperature depends on this balance between incoming and outgoing energy. When Earth's energy balance is shifted, its surface becomes warmer or cooler, leading to a variety of changes in global climate. Radiative forcing is a metric calculated in watts per square meter, which characterizes the impact of an external change in a factor that influences climate. It is calculated as the difference in top-of-atmosphere (TOA) energy balance immediately caused by such an external change. A positive forcing, such as from increased concentrations of greenhouse gases, means more energy arriving than leaving at the top-of-atmosphere, which causes additional warming, while negative forcing, like from sulfates forming in the atmosphere from sulfur dioxide, leads to cooling.

Within the lower atmosphere, greenhouse gases exchange thermal radiation with the surface and limit radiative heat flow away from it, which reduces the overall rate of upward radiative heat transfer. The increased concentration of greenhouse gases is also cooling the upper atmosphere, as it is much thinner than the lower layers, and any heat re-emitted from greenhouse gases is more likely to travel further to space than to interact with the fewer gas molecules in the upper layers. The upper atmosphere is also shrinking as the result.

== Contributions of specific gases to the greenhouse effect ==
Anthropogenic changes to the natural greenhouse effect are sometimes referred to as the enhanced greenhouse effect.

This table shows the most important contributions to the overall greenhouse effect, without which the average temperature of Earth's surface would be about −18 °C (0 °F), instead of around 15 °C (59 °F). This table also specifies tropospheric ozone, because this gas has a cooling effect in the stratosphere, but a warming influence comparable to nitrous oxide and CFCs in the troposphere.

Percent contribution to total greenhouse effect
	K&T (1997)		Schmidt (2010)	
Contributor	Clear Sky	With Clouds	Clear Sky	With Clouds
Water vapor	60	41	67	50
Clouds		31		25
CO_{2}	26	18	24	19
Tropospheric ozone (O_{3})	8			
N_{2}O + CH_{4}	6			
Other		9	9	7
K&T (1997) used 353 ppm CO_{2} and calculated 125 W/m^{2} total clear-sky greenhouse effect; relied on single atmospheric profile and cloud model. "With Clouds" percentages are from Schmidt's (2010) interpretation of K&T (1997). Schmidt (2010) used 1980 climatology with 339 ppm CO_{2} and 155 W/m^{2} total greenhouse effect; accounted for temporal and 3-D spatial distribution of absorbers.

=== Special role of water vapor ===
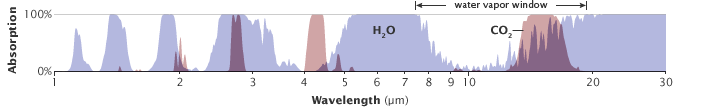
Atmospheric gases only absorb some wavelengths of energy but are transparent to others. The absorption patterns of water vapor (blue peaks) and carbon dioxide (pink peaks) overlap in some wavelengths.

Water vapor is the most important greenhouse gas overall, being responsible for 41–67% of the greenhouse effect, but its global concentrations are not directly affected by human activity. While local water vapor concentrations can be affected by developments such as irrigation, it has little impact on the global scale due to its short residence time of about nine days. Indirectly, an increase in global temperatures will also increase water vapor concentrations and thus their warming effect, in a process known as water vapor feedback. It occurs because the Clausius–Clapeyron relation holds that more water vapor will be present per unit volume at elevated temperatures. Thus, local atmospheric concentration of water vapor varies from less than 0.01% in extremely cold regions up to 3% by mass in saturated air at about 32 °C.

=== Global warming potential (GWP) and CO_{2} equivalents ===
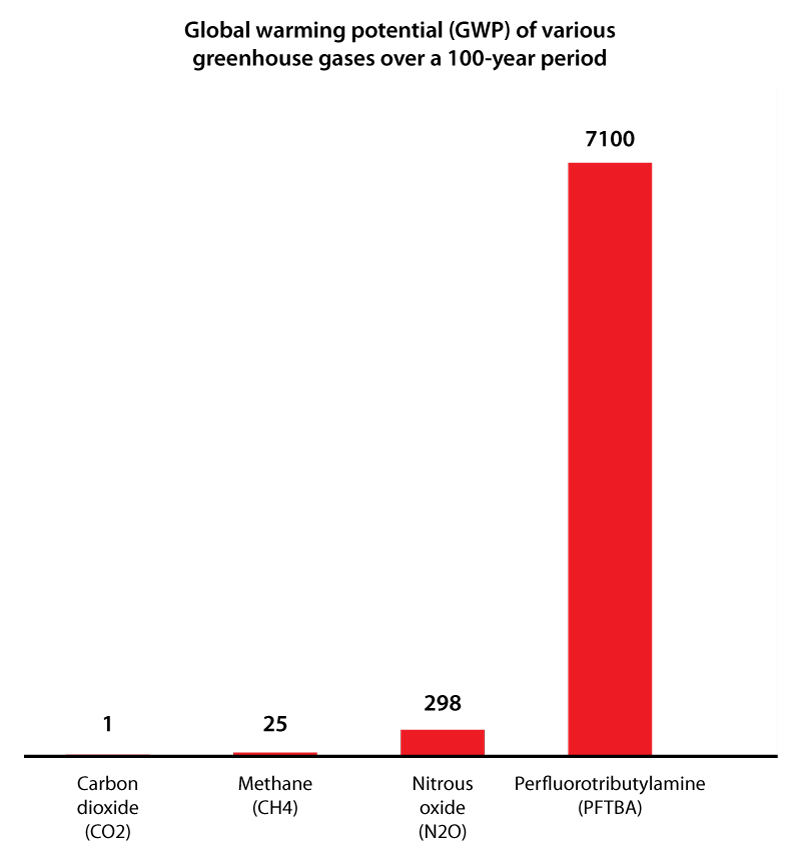
Comparison of global warming potential of three greenhouse gases over a 100-year period (GWP-100) per ton: Perfluorotributylamine (PFTBA), nitrous oxide and methane, compared to carbon dioxide (the latter is the reference value, therefore it has a GWP of one). PFTBA is here used as an example of a larger group of potent fluorinated greenhouse gases. Fluorinated hydrocarbons combined contribute about 10% to global warming.

Global warming potential (GWP) is a measure of how much heat a greenhouse gas (GHG) traps in the atmosphere over a specific time period, relative to carbon dioxide (CO_{2}). It is a dimensionless quantity expressed as a multiple of warming caused by the same mass of CO_{2}. Therefore, by definition CO_{2} has a GWP of 1. For other gases, it depends on how strongly the gas absorbs thermal radiation, how quickly it leaves the atmosphere, and the time frame considered.

For example, methane (CH_{4}) has a GWP over 20 years (GWP-20) of 81.2 meaning that, a leak of a tonne of methane is equivalent to emitting 81.2 tonnes of CO_{2}, both measured over 20 years. As methane has a much shorter atmospheric lifetime than CO_{2}, its GWP is much less over longer time periods, with a GWP-100 of 27.9 and a GWP-500 of 7.95.

Greenhouse gas emissions (GHG emissions) can be expressed in terms of carbon dioxide equivalent mass or just carbon dioxide equivalent (symbolized CO_{2}e or CO_{2}eq, also denoted CO_{2}-e or CO_{2}-eq) can be calculated from the GWP and emitted mass. For any gas, it is the mass of CO_{2} that would warm the earth as much as the mass of that gas. Thus it provides a common scale for measuring the climate effects of different gases. It is calculated as GWP times mass of the other gas; it is typically expressed in gigatonnes (symbol Gt).

== List of all greenhouse gases ==
The radiative forcing (warming influence) of long-lived atmospheric greenhouse gases has accelerated, almost doubling in 40 years.

The contribution of each gas to the enhanced greenhouse effect is determined by the characteristics of that gas, its abundance, and any indirect effects it may cause. For example, the direct radiative effect of a mass of methane is about 84 times stronger than the same mass of carbon dioxide over a 20-year time frame. Since the 1980s, greenhouse gas forcing contributions (relative to year 1750) are also estimated with high accuracy using IPCC-recommended expressions derived from radiative transfer models.

The concentration of a greenhouse gas is typically measured in parts per million (ppm) or parts per billion (ppb) by volume. A CO_{2} concentration of 420 ppm means that 420 out of every million air molecules is a CO_{2} molecule. The first 30 ppm increase in CO_{2} concentrations took place in about 200 years, from the start of the Industrial Revolution to 1958; however the next 90 ppm increase took place within 56 years, from 1958 to 2014. Similarly, the average annual increase in the 1960s was only 37% of what it was in 2000 through 2007.

Many observations are available online in a variety of Atmospheric Chemistry Observational Databases. The table below shows the most influential long-lived, well-mixed greenhouse gases, along with their tropospheric concentrations and direct radiative forcings, as identified by the Intergovernmental Panel on Climate Change (IPCC). Abundances of these trace gases are regularly measured by atmospheric scientists from samples collected throughout the world. It excludes water vapor because changes in its concentrations are calculated as a climate change feedback indirectly caused by changes in other greenhouse gases, as well as ozone, whose concentrations are only modified indirectly by various refrigerants that cause ozone depletion. Some short-lived gases (e.g. carbon monoxide, NOx) and aerosols (e.g. mineral dust or black carbon) are also excluded because of limited role and strong variation, along with minor refrigerants and other halogenated gases, which have been mass-produced in smaller quantities than those in the table. and Annex III of the 2021 IPCC WG1 Report

IPCC list of greenhouse gases with lifetime, 100-year global warming potential, concentrations in the troposphere and radiative forcings. The abbreviations TAR, AR4, AR5 and AR6 refer to the different IPCC reports over the years. The baseline is pre-industrialization (year 1750).
Species	Lifetime (years)	100-yr GWP	Mole Fraction [ppt – except as noted] (Note: Mole fractions: μmol/mol = ppm = parts per million (10^{6}); nmol/mol = ppb = parts per billion (10^{9}); pmol/mol = ppt = parts per trillion (10^{12}).) + Radiative forcing [W m^{−2}] (Note: Values are relative to year 1750. AR6 reports the effective radiative forcing which includes effects of rapid adjustments in the atmosphere and at the surface.)					Concentrations over time up to year 2022
Species	Lifetime (years)	100-yr GWP	Baseline Year 1750	TAR Year 1998	AR4 Year 2005	AR5 Year 2011	AR6 Year 2019	Concentrations over time up to year 2022
CO_{2} [ppm]	(Note: The IPCC states that "no single atmospheric lifetime can be given" for CO_{2}. This is mostly due to the rapid growth and cumulative magnitude of the disturbances to Earth's carbon cycle by the geologic extraction and burning of fossil carbon. As of year 2014, fossil CO_{2} emitted as a theoretical 10 to 100 GtC pulse on top of the existing atmospheric concentration was expected to be 50% removed by land vegetation and ocean sinks in less than about a century, as based on the projections of coupled models referenced in the AR5 assessment. A substantial fraction (20–35%) was also projected to remain in the atmosphere for centuries to millennia, where fractional persistence increases with pulse size.)	1	278	365 (1.46)	379 (1.66)	391 (1.82)	410 (2.16)	
CH_{4} [ppb]	12.4	28	700	1,745 (0.48)	1,774 (0.48)	1,801 (0.48)	1866 (0.54)	
N_{2}O [ppb]	121	265	270	314 (0.15)	319 (0.16)	324 (0.17)	332 (0.21)	
CFC-11	45	4,660	0	268 (0.07)	251 (0.063)	238 (0.062)	226 (0.066)	
CFC-12	100	10,200	0	533 (0.17)	538 (0.17)	528 (0.17)	503 (0.18)	
CFC-13	640	13,900	0	4 (0.001)	–	2.7 (0.0007)	3.28 (0.0009)	cfc13
CFC-113	85	6,490	0	84 (0.03)	79 (0.024)	74 (0.022)	70 (0.021)	
CFC-114	190	7,710	0	15 (0.005)	–	–	16 (0.005)	cfc114
CFC-115	1,020	5,860	0	7 (0.001)	–	8.37 (0.0017)	8.67 (0.0021)	cfc115
HCFC-22	11.9	5,280	0	132 (0.03)	169 (0.033)	213 (0.0447)	247 (0.0528)	
HCFC-141b	9.2	2,550	0	10 (0.001)	18 (0.0025)	21.4 (0.0034)	24.4 (0.0039)	
HCFC-142b	17.2	5,020	0	11 (0.002)	15 (0.0031)	21.2 (0.0040)	22.3 (0.0043)	
CH_{3}CCl_{3}	5	160	0	69 (0.004)	19 (0.0011)	6.32 (0.0004)	1.6 (0.0001)	
CCl_{4}	26	1,730	0 (Note: Natural sources do exist, but these do not produce a concentration as high as 1 part per quadrillion)	102 (0.01)	93 (0.012)	85.8 (0.0146)	78 (0.0129)	
HFC-23	222	12,400	0	14 (0.002)	18 (0.0033)	24 (0.0043)	32.4 (0.0062)	
HFC-32	5.2	677	0	–	–	4.92 (0.0005)	20 (0.0022)	
HFC-125	28.2	3,170	0	–	3.7 (0.0009)	9.58 (0.0022)	29.4 (0.0069)	
HFC-134a	13.4	1,300	0	7.5 (0.001)	35 (0.0055)	62.7 (0.0100)	107.6 (0.018)	
HFC-143a	47.1	4,800	0	–	–	12.0 (0.0019)	24 (0.0040)	
HFC-152a	1.5	138	0	0.5 (0.0000)	3.9 (0.0004)	6.4 (0.0006)	7.1 (0.0007)	
CF_{4} (PFC-14)	50,000	6,630	40 (Note: Figure is combined total natural abundance of all perfluorocarbons: no data exist for individual compounds.)	80 (0.003)	74 (0.0034)	79 (0.0040)	85.5 (0.0051)	
C_{2}F_{6} (PFC-116)	10,000	11,100	40	3 (0.001)	2.9 (0.0008)	4.16 (0.0010)	4.85 (0.0013)	
SF_{6}	3,200	23,500	0.01	4.2 (0.002)	5.6 (0.0029)	7.28 (0.0041)	9.95 (0.0056)	
SO_{2}F_{2}	36	4,090	0	–	–	1.71 (0.0003)	2.5 (0.0005)	
NF_{3}	500	16,100	0	–	–	0.9 (0.0002)	2.05 (0.0004)	

== Factors affecting concentrations ==
Atmospheric concentrations are determined by the balance between sources (emissions of the gas from human activities and natural systems) and sinks (the removal of the gas from the atmosphere by conversion to a different chemical compound or absorption by bodies of water).

=== Airborne fraction ===
Most CO_{2} emissions have been absorbed by carbon sinks, including plant growth, soil uptake, and ocean uptake (2020 Global Carbon Budget).

The proportion of an emission remaining in the atmosphere after a specified time is the "airborne fraction" (AF). The annual airborne fraction is the ratio of the atmospheric increase in a given year to that year's total emissions. The annual airborne fraction for CO_{2} had been stable at 0.45 for the past six decades even as the emissions have been increasing. This means that the other 0.55 of emitted CO_{2} is absorbed by the land and atmosphere carbon sinks within the first year of an emission. In the high-emission scenarios, the effectiveness of carbon sinks will be lower, increasing the atmospheric fraction of CO_{2} even though the raw amount of emissions absorbed will be higher than in the present.

=== Atmospheric lifetime ===
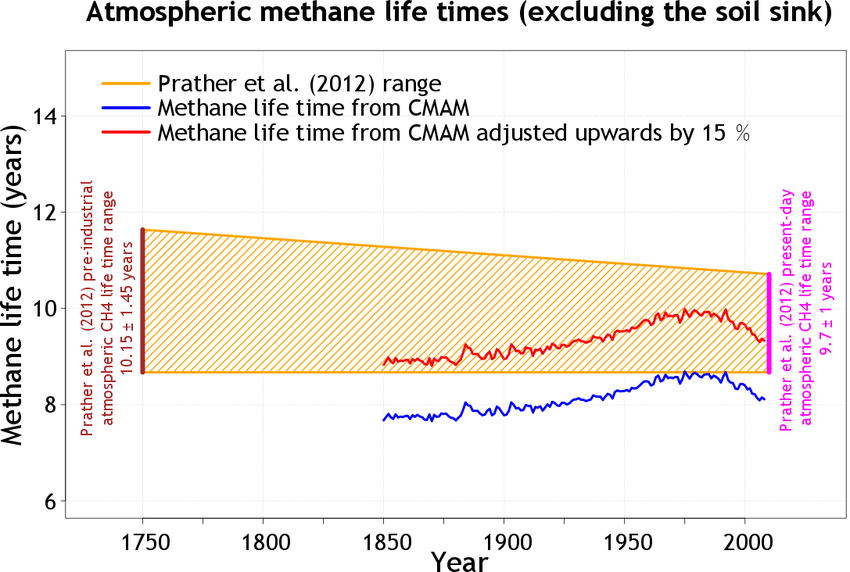
Estimated atmospheric methane lifetime before the industrial era (shaded area); changes in methane lifetime since 1850 as simulated by a climate model (blue line), and the reconciled graph (red line).

Major greenhouse gases are well mixed and take many years to leave the atmosphere.

The atmospheric lifetime of a greenhouse gas refers to the time required to restore equilibrium following a sudden increase or decrease in its concentration in the atmosphere. Individual atoms or molecules may be lost or deposited to sinks such as the soil, the oceans and other waters, or vegetation and other biological systems, reducing the excess to background concentrations. The average time taken to achieve this is the mean lifetime. This can be represented through the following formula, where the lifetime $\tau$ of an atmospheric species X in a one-box model is the average time that a molecule of X remains in the box.

$\tau$ can also be defined as the ratio of the mass $m$ (in kg) of X in the box to its removal rate, which is the sum of the flow of X out of the box ($F_\text{out}$), chemical loss of X ($L$), and deposition of X ($D$) (all in kg/s):

$\tau = \frac{m}{F_\text{out}+L+D}$.

If input of this gas into the box ceased, then after time $\tau$, its concentration would decrease by about 63%.

Changes to any of these variables can alter the atmospheric lifetime of a greenhouse gas. For instance, methane's atmospheric lifetime is estimated to have been lower in the 19th century than now, but to have been higher in the second half of the 20th century than after 2000. Carbon dioxide has an even more variable lifetime, which cannot be specified down to a single number. Scientists instead say that while the first 10% of carbon dioxide's airborne fraction (not counting the ~50% absorbed by land and ocean sinks within the emission's first year) is removed "quickly", the vast majority of the airborne fraction – 80% – lasts for "centuries to millennia". The remaining 10% stays for tens of thousands of years. In some models, this longest-lasting fraction is as large as 30%.

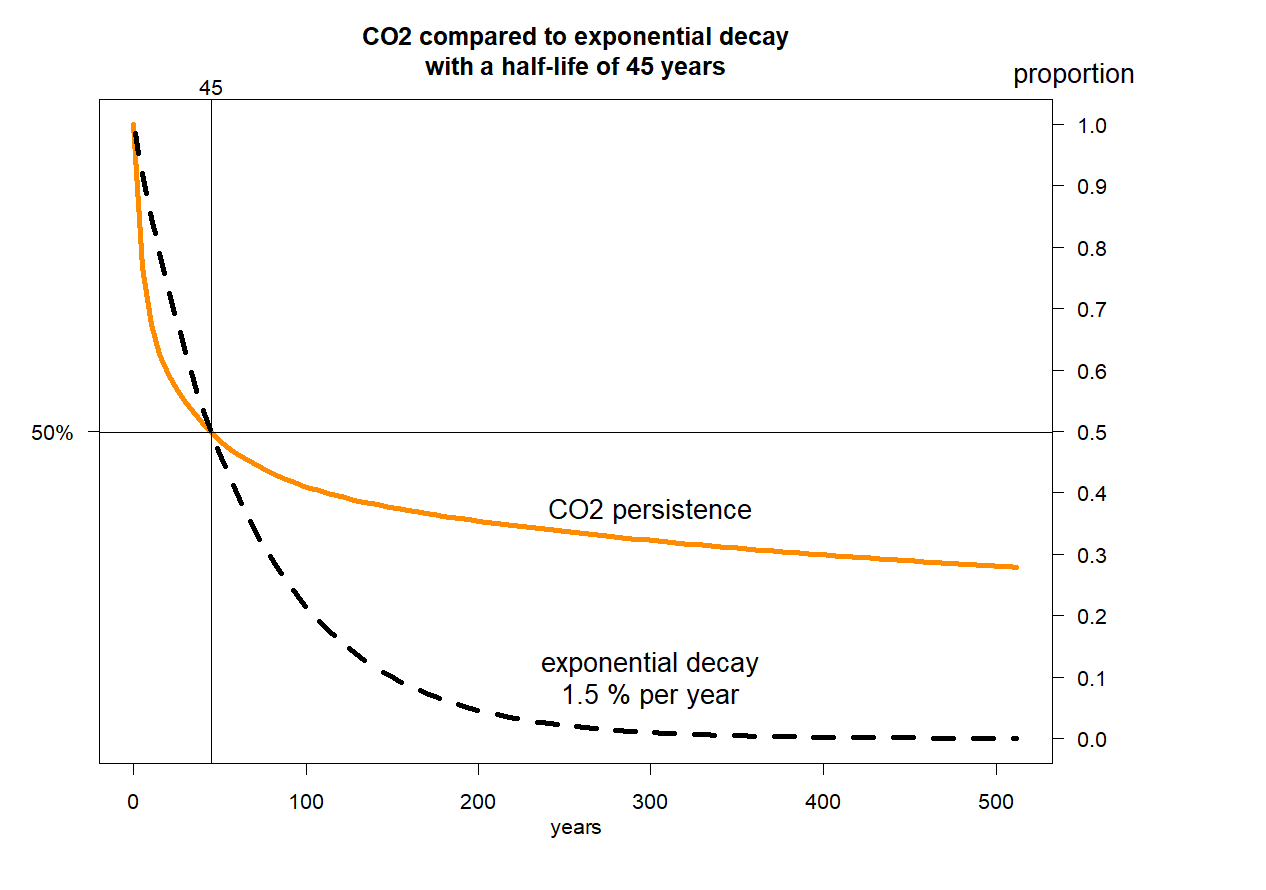
A comparison of CO2 persistence in the atmosphere with an exponential decay function with the same half-life

=== During geologic time scales ===
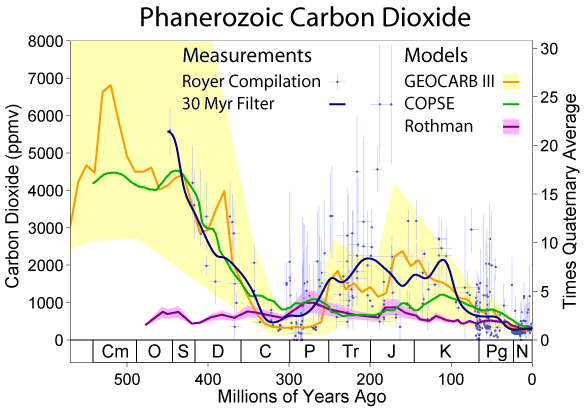
CO_{2} concentrations over the last 500 million years

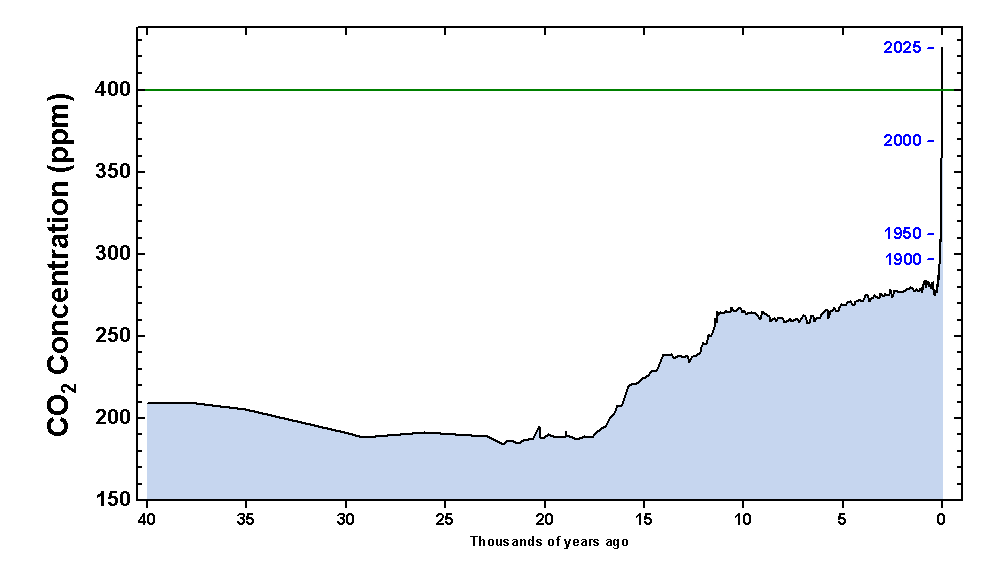
Concentration of atmospheric CO_{2} over the last 40,000 years, from the Last Glacial Maximum to the present day. The current rate of increase is much higher than at any point during the last deglaciation.

Graphs of carbon dioxide concentration and temperature over time.

Estimates in 2023 found that the current carbon dioxide concentration in the atmosphere may be the highest it has been in the last 14 million years. However the IPCC Sixth Assessment Report estimated similar levels 3 to 3.3 million years ago in the mid-Pliocene warm period. This period can be a proxy for likely climate outcomes with current levels of CO_{2}.

Carbon dioxide is believed to have played an important effect in regulating Earth's temperature throughout its 4.54 billion year history. Early in the Earth's life, scientists have found evidence of liquid water indicating a warm world even though the Sun's output is believed to have only been 70% of what it is today. Higher carbon dioxide concentrations in the early Earth's atmosphere might help explain this faint young sun paradox. When Earth first formed, Earth's atmosphere may have contained more greenhouse gases and CO_{2} concentrations may have been higher, with estimated partial pressure as large as 1,000 kPa (10 bar), because there was no bacterial photosynthesis to reduce the gas to carbon compounds and oxygen. Methane, a very active greenhouse gas, may have been more prevalent as well.

== Monitoring ==
Greenhouse gas monitoring involves the direct measurement of atmospheric concentrations and direct and indirect measurement of greenhouse gas emissions. Indirect methods calculate emissions of greenhouse gases based on related metrics such as fossil fuel extraction.

There are several different methods of measuring carbon dioxide concentrations in the atmosphere, including infrared analyzing and manometry. Methane and nitrous oxide are measured by other instruments, such as the range-resolved infrared differential absorption lidar (DIAL). Greenhouse gases are measured from space such as by the Orbiting Carbon Observatory and through networks of ground stations such as the Integrated Carbon Observation System.

The Annual Greenhouse Gas Index (AGGI) is defined by atmospheric scientists at NOAA as the ratio of total direct radiative forcing due to long-lived and well-mixed greenhouse gases for any year for which adequate global measurements exist, to that present in year 1990. These radiative forcing levels are relative to those present in year 1750 (i.e. prior to the start of the industrial era). 1990 is chosen because it is the baseline year for the Kyoto Protocol, and is the publication year of the first IPCC Scientific Assessment of Climate Change. As such, NOAA states that the AGGI "measures the commitment that (global) society has already made to living in a changing climate. It is based on the highest quality atmospheric observations from sites around the world. Its uncertainty is very low."

=== Data networks ===
There are several surface measurement (including flasks and continuous in situ) networks including NOAA/ERSL, WDCGG, and RAMCES. The NOAA/ESRL Baseline Observatory Network, and the Scripps Institution of Oceanography Network data are hosted at the CDIAC at ORNL. The World Data Centre for Greenhouse Gases (WDCGG), part of GAW, data are hosted by the JMA. The Reseau Atmospherique de Mesure des Composes an Effet de Serre database (RAMCES) is part of IPSL.

== Types of sources ==
=== Natural sources ===
The natural flows of carbon between the atmosphere, ocean, terrestrial ecosystems, and sediments are fairly balanced; so carbon levels would be roughly stable without human influence. Carbon dioxide is removed from the atmosphere primarily through photosynthesis and enters the terrestrial and oceanic biospheres. Carbon dioxide also dissolves directly from the atmosphere into bodies of water (ocean, lakes, etc.), as well as dissolving in precipitation as raindrops fall through the atmosphere. When dissolved in water, carbon dioxide reacts with water molecules and forms carbonic acid. It can then acidify the surfaces it touches, thereby be absorbed by rocks through weathering, or be washed into the ocean contributing to ocean acidity.

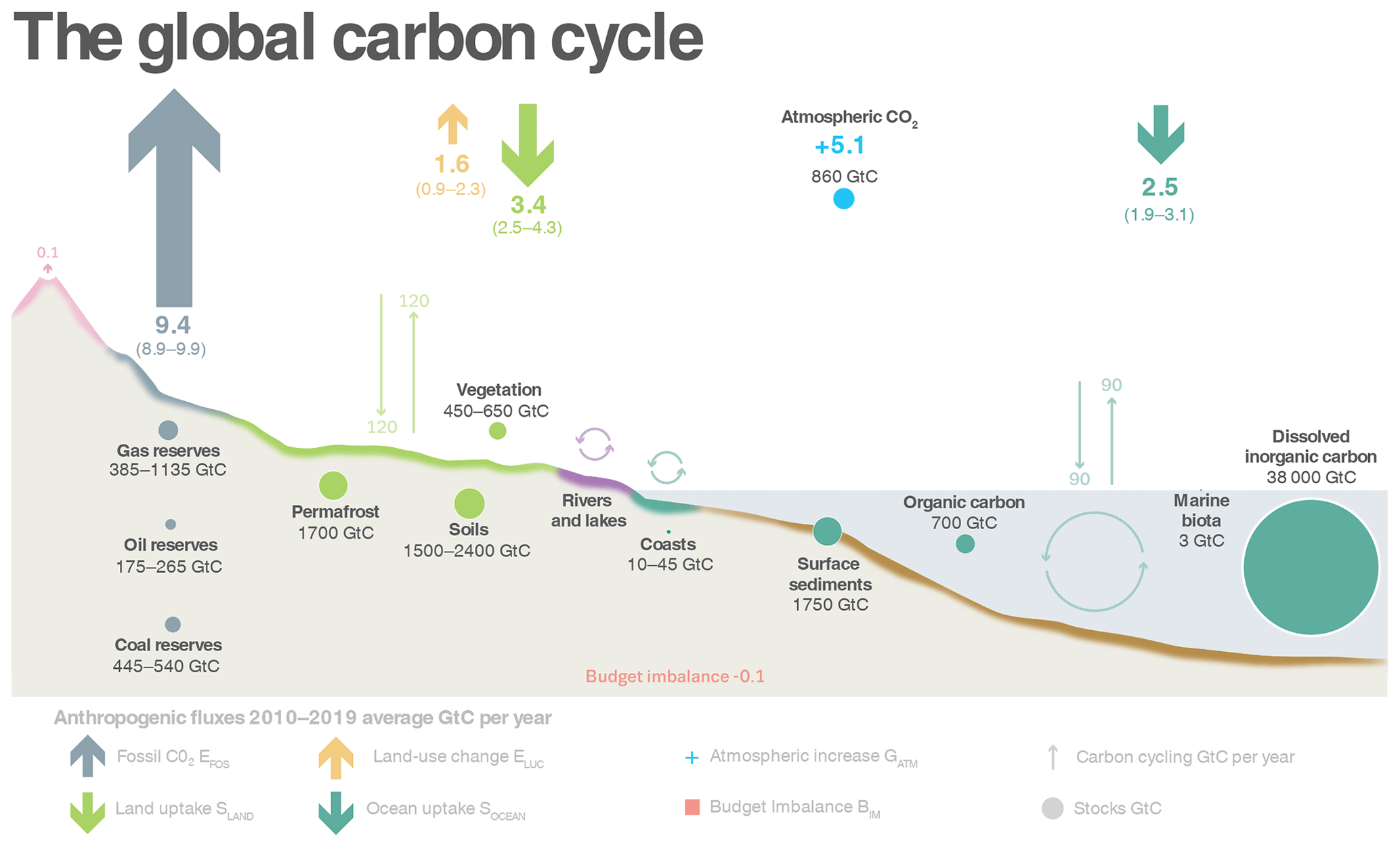
Schematic representation of the overall perturbation of the global carbon cycle caused by anthropogenic activities, averaged from 2010 to 2019

The atmospheric carbon cycle accounts for the exchange of gaseous carbon compounds, primarily carbon dioxide (CO_{2}), between Earth's atmosphere, the oceans, and the terrestrial biosphere. It is one of the faster components of the planet's overall carbon cycle, supporting the exchange of more than 200 billion tons of carbon (i.e. gigatons carbon or GtC) in and out of the atmosphere throughout the course of each year. Atmospheric concentrations of CO_{2} remain stable over longer timescales only when there exists a balance between these two flows. Methane (CH_{4}), Carbon monoxide (CO), and other human-made compounds are present in smaller concentrations and are also part of the atmospheric carbon cycle.

=== Human-made sources ===
Taking into account direct and indirect emissions, industry is the sector with the highest share of global emissions. Data as of 2019 from the IPCC.

The vast majority of carbon dioxide emissions by humans come from the burning of fossil fuels. Additional contributions come from cement manufacturing, fertilizer production, and changes in land use like deforestation. Methane emissions originate from agriculture, fossil fuel production, waste, and other sources. Rice paddies are a significant agricultural source of greenhouse gas emissions, contributing 22% of total agricultural methane and 11% of nitrous oxide emissions.

If current emission rates continue then temperature rises will surpass 2.0 °C (3.6 °F) sometime between 2040 and 2070, which is the level the United Nations' Intergovernmental Panel on Climate Change (IPCC) says is "dangerous".

Most greenhouse gases have both natural and human-caused sources. An exception are purely human-produced synthetic halocarbons which have no natural sources. During the pre-industrial Holocene, concentrations of existing gases were roughly constant, because the large natural sources and sinks roughly balanced. In the industrial era, human activities have added greenhouse gases to the atmosphere, mainly through the burning of fossil fuels and clearing of forests.

The major anthropogenic (human origin) sources of greenhouse gases are carbon dioxide (CO_{2}), nitrous oxide (N_{2}O), methane and three groups of fluorinated gases (sulfur hexafluoride (SF_{6}), hydrofluorocarbons (HFCs) and perfluorocarbons (PFCs, sulphur hexafluoride (SF_{6}), and nitrogen trifluoride (NF_{3})). Though the greenhouse effect is heavily driven by water vapor, human emissions of water vapor are not a significant contributor to warming.

== Reducing human-caused greenhouse gases ==
=== Needed emissions cuts ===
Global greenhouse gas emission scenarios, based on policies and pledges as of 11/21

The annual "Emissions Gap Report" by UNEP stated in 2022 that it was necessary to almost halve emissions. "To get on track for limiting global warming to 1.5°C, global annual GHG emissions must be reduced by 45 per cent compared with emissions projections under policies currently in place in just eight years, and they must continue to decline rapidly after 2030, to avoid exhausting the limited remaining atmospheric carbon budget." The report commented that the world should focus on broad-based economy-wide transformations and not incremental change.

In 2022, the Intergovernmental Panel on Climate Change (IPCC) released its Sixth Assessment Report on climate change. It warned that greenhouse gas emissions must peak before 2025 at the latest and decline 43% by 2030 to have a good chance of limiting global warming to 1.5 °C (2.7 °F). Or in the words of Secretary-General of the United Nations António Guterres: "Main emitters must drastically cut emissions starting this year".

According to a joint press release published by the German Physical society and the German meteorological society in September 2025, if the current trends will continue, global temperature can rise to 3°C above pre-industrial level by the year 2050, and by 5°C by the year 2100. The scientists emphasised the need to urgently implement already existing solutions.

=== Removal from the atmosphere through negative emissions ===
Several technologies remove greenhouse gas emissions from the atmosphere. Most widely analyzed are those that remove carbon dioxide from the atmosphere, either to geologic formations such as bio-energy with carbon capture and storage and carbon dioxide air capture, or to the soil as in the case with biochar. Many long-term climate scenario models require large-scale human-made negative emissions to avoid serious climate change.

Negative emissions approaches are also being studied for atmospheric methane, called atmospheric methane removal.

== History of discovery ==
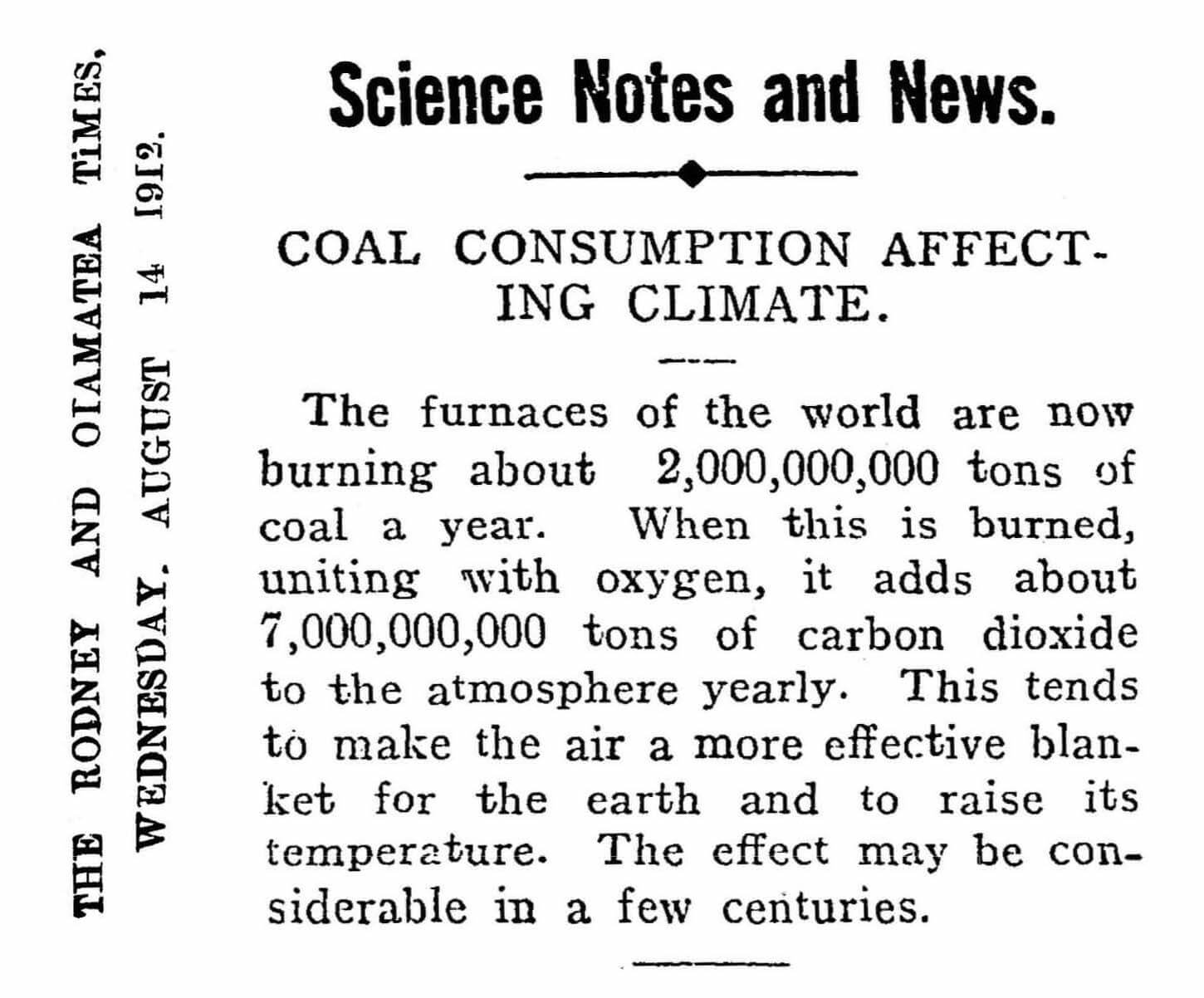
This 1912 article succinctly describes how burning coal creates carbon dioxide that causes climate change.

In the late 19th century, scientists experimentally discovered that N_{2} and O_{2} do not absorb infrared radiation (called, at that time, "dark radiation"), while water (both as true vapor and condensed in the form of microscopic droplets suspended in clouds) and CO_{2} and other poly-atomic gaseous molecules do absorb infrared radiation. In the early 20th century, researchers realized that greenhouse gases in the atmosphere made Earth's overall temperature higher than it would be without them. The term greenhouse was first applied to this phenomenon by Nils Gustaf Ekholm in 1901.

During the late 20th century, a scientific consensus evolved that increasing concentrations of greenhouse gases in the atmosphere cause a substantial rise in global temperatures and changes to other parts of the climate system, with consequences for the environment and for human health.

== Other planets ==
Greenhouse gases exist in many atmospheres, creating greenhouse effects on Mars, Titan, and particularly in the thick atmosphere of Venus. While Venus has been described as the ultimate end state of runaway greenhouse effect, such a process would have virtually no chance of occurring from any increases in greenhouse gas concentrations caused by humans, as the Sun's brightness is too low and it would likely need to increase by some tens of percents, which will take a few billion years.

== See also ==
- Carbon accounting – Processes used to measure emissions of carbon dioxide equivalents
- Carbon budget – Limit on carbon dioxide emission for a given climate impact
- Carbon sequestration – Storing carbon in a carbon pool
- Climate change feedbacks – Feedback related to climate change
