= Atmospheric methane =

Methane (CH4) in Earth's atmosphere

About 60% of current methane emissions are human-caused, contributing to the growth of methane gas in the atmosphere.

Since the beginning of the Industrial Revolution (around 1750), the methane concentration in the atmosphere has increased by about 160%, and human activities almost entirely caused this increase. Since 1750 methane has contributed 3% of greenhouse gas (GHG) emissions in terms of mass but is responsible for approximately 23% of radiative or climate forcing. By 2025, global methane concentrations had risen from 722 parts per billion (ppb) in pre-industrial times to 1936 ppb. This is an increase by a factor of 2.6 and the highest value in at least 800,000 years.

Methane increases the amount of ozone (O_{3}) in the troposphere (4 miles (6 km) to 12 miles (19 km) from the Earth's surface) and also in the stratosphere (from the troposphere to 31 miles (50 km) above the Earth's surface). Both water vapour and ozone are GHGs, which in turn add to global warming.

== Role in climate change ==
The warming influence (called radiative forcing) of long-lived greenhouse gases has nearly doubled in 40 years, with carbon dioxide and methane being the dominant drivers of global warming.

Radiative forcing (warming influence) of different contributors to climate change through 2019, as reported in the Sixth IPCC assessment report

Methane (CH_{4}) in the Earth's atmosphere is a powerful greenhouse gas with a global warming potential (GWP) 84 times greater than CO_{2} over a 20-year time frame. Methane is not as persistent as CO_{2}, and tails off to about 28 times greater than CO_{2} over a 100-year time frame.

Radiative or climate forcing is the scientific concept used to measure the human impact on the environment in watts per square meter (W/m^{2}). It refers to the "difference between solar irradiance absorbed by the Earth and energy radiated back to space" The direct radiative greenhouse gas forcing effect of methane was estimated to be an increase of 0.5 W/m^{2} relative to the year 1750 (estimate in 2007).

In their 2021 "Global Methane Assessment" report, the UNEP and CCAC said that their "understanding of methane's effect on radiative forcing" improved with research by teams led by M. Etminan in 2016, and William Collins in 2018. This resulted in an "upward revision" since the 2014 IPCC Fifth Assessment Report (AR5). The "improved understanding" says that prior estimates of the "overall societal impact of methane emissions" were likely underestimated.

Etminan et al. published their new calculations for methane's radiative forcing (RF) in a 2016 Geophysical Research Letters journal article which incorporated the shortwave bands of CH_{4} in measuring forcing, not used in previous, simpler IPCC methods. Their new RF calculations which significantly revised those cited in earlier, successive IPCC reports for well mixed greenhouse gases (WMGHG) forcings by including the shortwave forcing component due to CH_{4}, resulted in estimates that were approximately 20–25% higher. Collins et al. said that CH_{4} mitigation that reduces atmospheric methane by the end of the century, could "make a substantial difference to the feasibility of achieving the Paris climate targets", and would provide us with more "allowable carbon emissions to 2100".

In addition to the direct heating effect and the normal feedbacks, the methane breaks down to carbon dioxide and water. This water is often above the tropopause, where little water usually reaches. Ramanathan (1998) notes that both water and ice clouds, when formed at cold lower stratospheric temperatures, are extremely efficient in enhancing the atmospheric greenhouse effect. He also notes that there is a distinct possibility that large increases in methane in future may lead to a surface warming that increases nonlinearly with the methane concentration.

Mitigation efforts to reduce short-lived climate pollutants like methane and black carbon would help combat "near-term climate change" and would support Sustainable Development Goals.

== Sources ==
Methane emissions from fossil fuels, industrial and agricultural practices have increased since the industrial revolution.

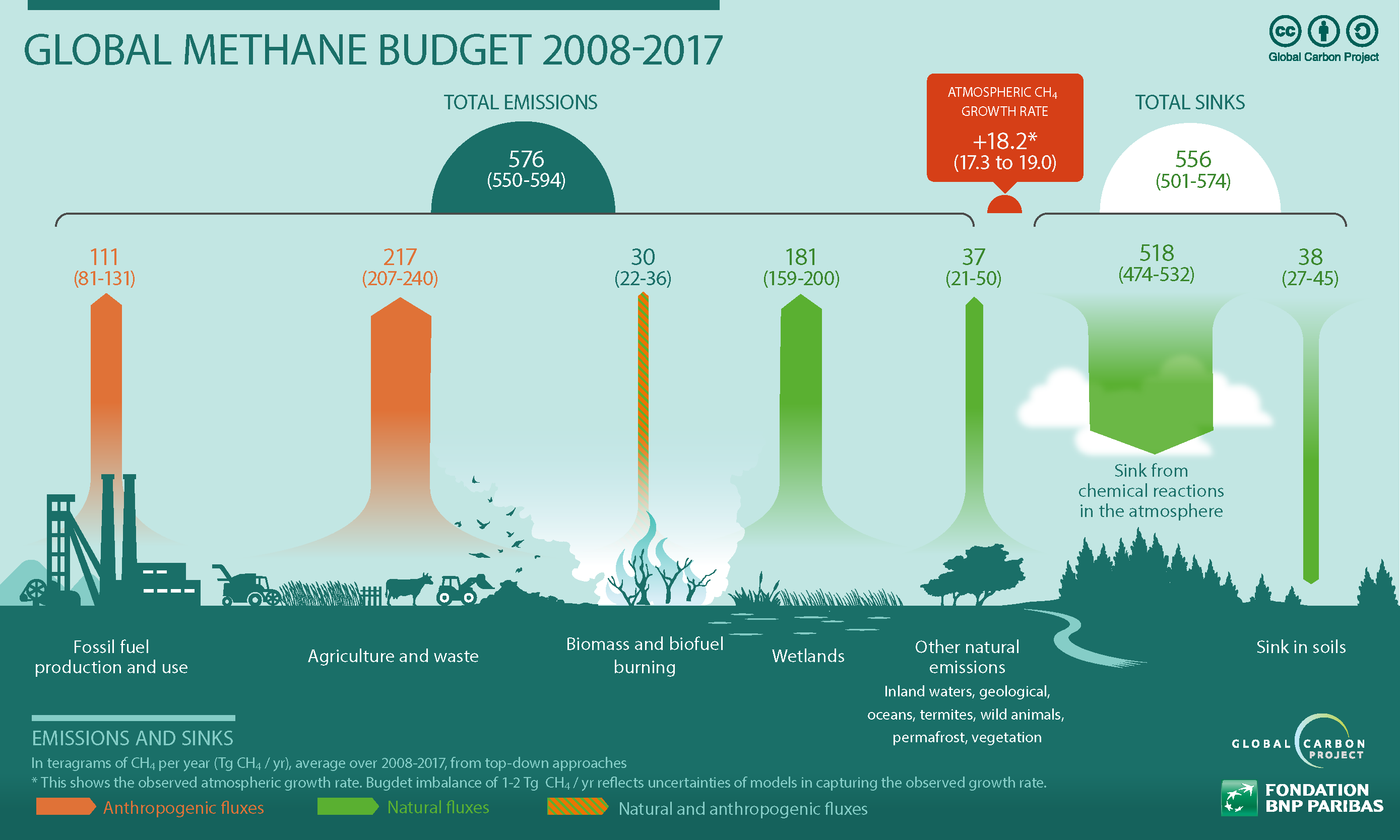
Main sources of global methane emissions (2008–2017) according to the Global Carbon Project

Any process that results in the production of methane and its release into the atmosphere can be considered a "source". The known sources of methane are predominantly located near the Earth's surface. Two main processes that are responsible for methane production include microorganisms anaerobically converting organic compounds into methane (methanogenesis), which are widespread in aquatic ecosystems, and ruminant animals.

Methane is also released in the Arctic for example from thawing permafrost.

Increasing methane emissions are a major contributor to the rising concentration of greenhouse gases in Earth's atmosphere, and are responsible for up to one-third of near-term global heating. During 2019, about 60% (360 million tons) of methane released globally was from human activities, while natural sources contributed about 40% (230 million tons). During 2024, it was estimated that 610 million tons of methane were released globally with nearly two-thirds of it being from human activity. Reducing methane emissions by capturing and utilizing the gas can produce simultaneous environmental and economic benefits.

Since the Industrial Revolution, concentrations of methane in the atmosphere have more than doubled, and about 20 percent of the warming the planet has experienced can be attributed to the gas. About one-third (33%) of anthropogenic emissions are from gas release during the extraction and delivery of fossil fuels; mostly due to gas venting and gas leaks from both active fossil fuel infrastructure and orphan wells. As of 2024, the United States is the world's top methane emitter from oil and gas, while China stands at the top for methane emissions from coal. The International Energy Agency (IEA) highlights that abandoned coal mines and oil and gas wells have become significant sources of methane emissions. If considered a country, these emissions would rank as the fourth-largest globally, surpassing those of Iran. The IEA estimates that addressing over 8 million abandoned onshore oil and gas sites would cost about $100 billion.

Animal agriculture is a similarly large source (30%), primarily because of enteric fermentation by ruminant livestock such as cattle and sheep. According to the Global Methane Assessment published in 2021, methane emissions from livestock (including cattle) are the largest sources of agricultural emissions worldwide A single cow can make up to 99 kg of methane gas per year. Ruminant livestock can produce 250 to 500 L of methane per day.

== Measurement techniques ==
Methane was typically measured using gas chromatography. Gas chromatography is a type of chromatography used for separating or analyzing chemical compounds. It is less expensive in general, compared to more advanced methods, but it is more time and labor-intensive.

Spectroscopic methods were the preferred method for atmospheric gas measurements due to its sensitivity and precision. Also, spectroscopic methods are the only way of remotely sensing the atmospheric gases. Infrared spectroscopy covers a large spectrum of techniques, one of which detects gases based on absorption spectroscopy. There are various methods for spectroscopic methods, including Differential optical absorption spectroscopy, laser-induced fluorescence, and Fourier-transform infrared.

In 2011, cavity ring-down spectroscopy was the most widely used IR absorption technique of detecting methane. It is a form of laser absorption spectroscopy which determines the mole fraction to the order of parts per trillion.

== Global monitoring ==
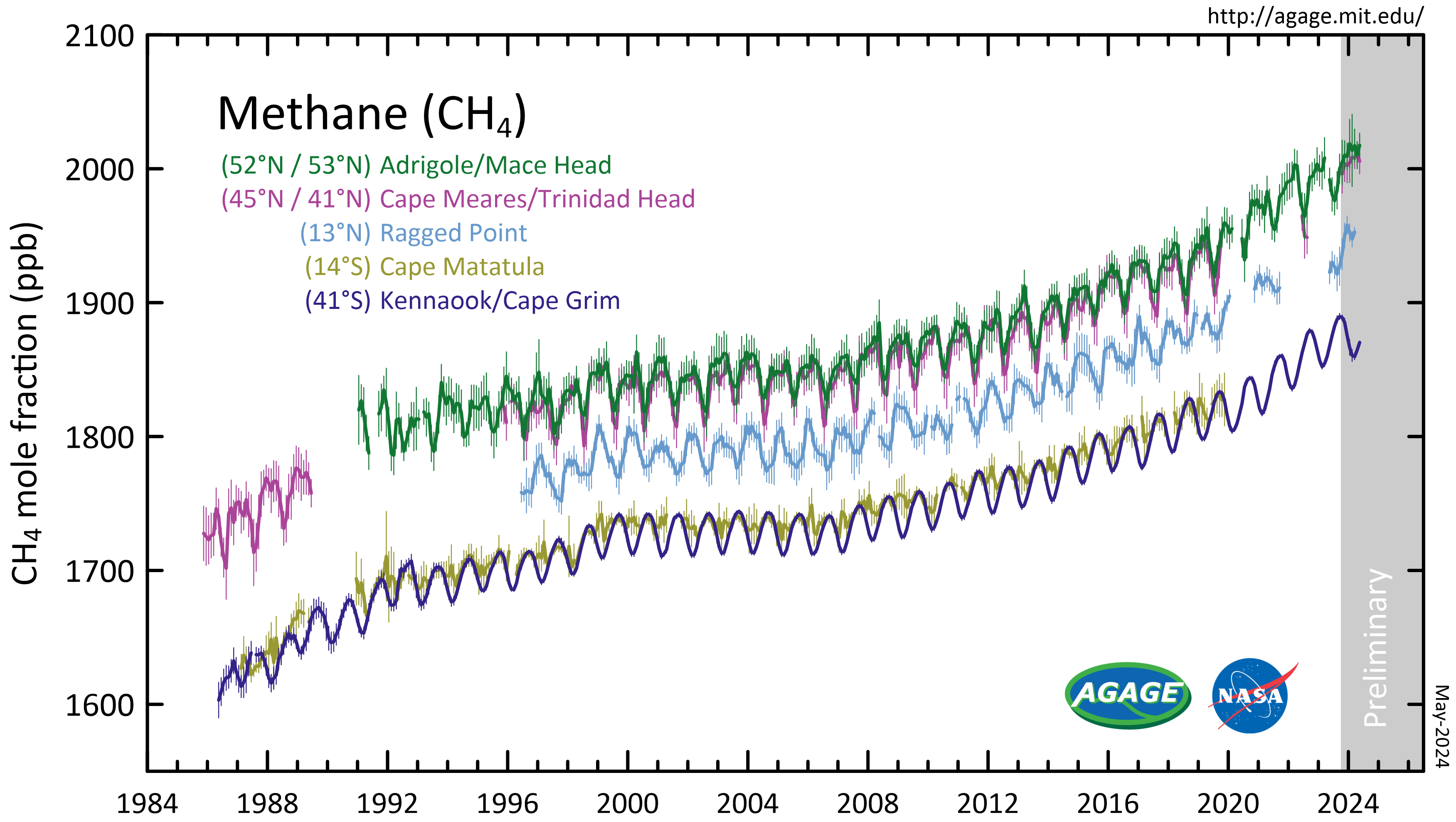
Methane (CH_{4}) concentrations in the atmosphere measured by the Advanced Global Atmospheric Gases Experiment (AGAGE) in the lower atmosphere (troposphere) at stations around the world. Values are given as pollution free monthly mean mole fractions in parts-per-billion.

Atmospheric methane is the methane present in Earth's atmosphere. The concentration of atmospheric methane is increasing due to methane emissions, and is causing climate change. Methane is one of the most potent greenhouse gases. Methane's radiative forcing (RF) of climate is direct, and it is the second largest contributor to human-caused climate forcing in the historical period. Methane is a major source of water vapour in the stratosphere through oxidation; and water vapour adds about 15% to methane's radiative forcing effect. The global warming potential (GWP) for methane is about 84 in terms of its impact over a 20-year timeframe, and 28 in terms of its impact over a 100-year timeframe.

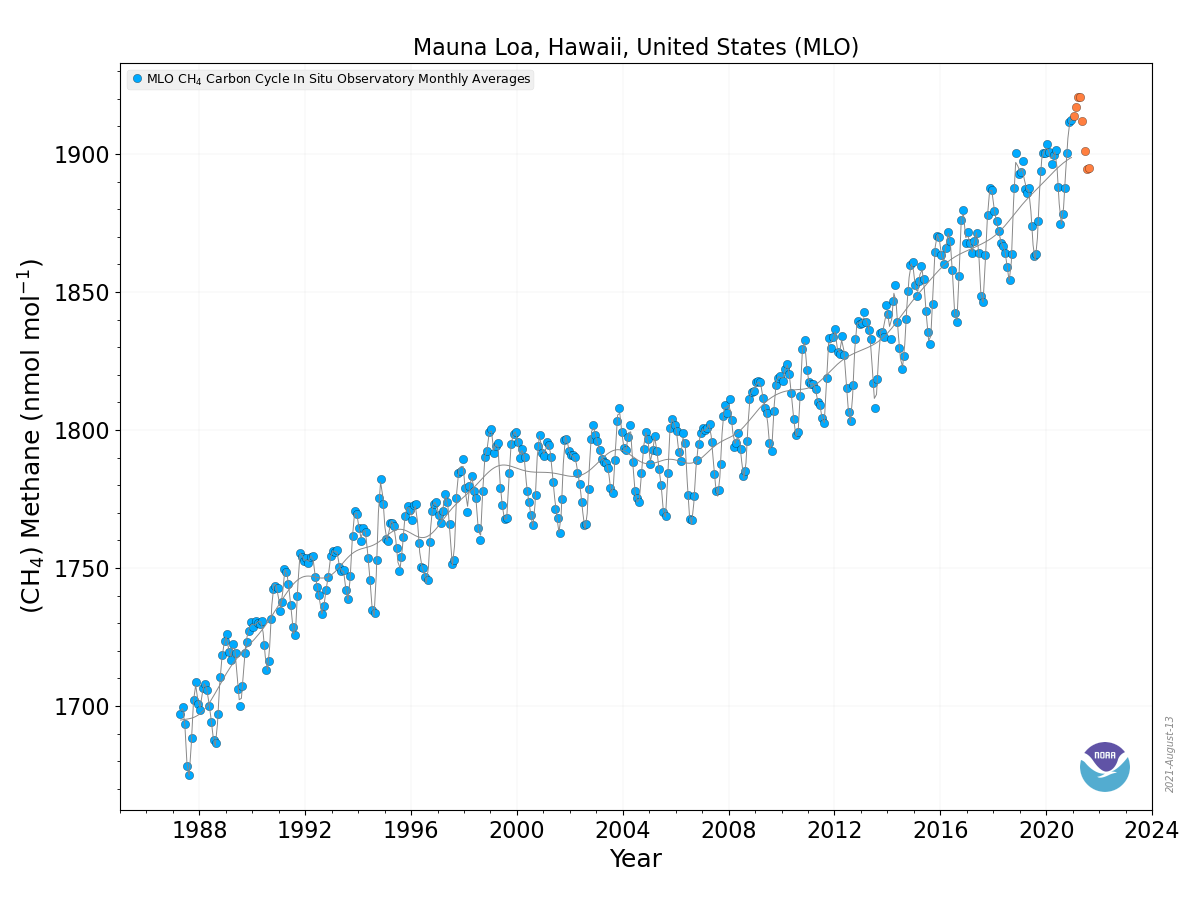
Methane concentration at NOAA's Mauna Loa observatory through July 2021: A record-high of 1912 ppb was reached in December 2020.

CH_{4} has been measured directly in the environment since the 1970s. The Earth's atmospheric methane concentration has increased 160% since preindustrial levels in the mid-18th century.

Long term atmospheric measurements of methane by NOAA show that the build up of methane nearly tripled since pre-industrial times since 1750. In 1991 and 1998 there was a sudden growth rate of methane representing a doubling of growth rates in previous years. The June 15, 1991 eruption of Mount Pinatubo, measuring VEI-6—was the second-largest terrestrial eruption of the 20th century. In 2007 it was reported that unprecedented warm temperatures in 1998—the warmest year since surface records were recorded—could have induced elevated methane emissions, along with an increase in wetland and rice field emissions and the amount of biomass burning.

Data from 2007 suggested methane concentrations were beginning to rise again. This was confirmed in 2010 when a study showed methane levels were on the rise for the 3 years 2007 to 2009. After a decade of near-zero growth in methane levels, "globally averaged atmospheric methane increased by [approximately] 7 nmol/mol per year during 2007 and 2008. During the first half of 2009, globally averaged atmospheric CH_{4} was [approximately] 7 nmol/mol greater than it was in 2008, suggesting that the increase will continue in 2009." From 2015 to 2019 sharp rises in levels of atmospheric methane have been recorded.

In 2010, methane levels in the Arctic were measured at 1850 nmol/mol which is over twice as high as at any time in the last 400,000 years. According to the IPCC AR5, since 2011 concentrations continued to increase. After 2014, the increase accelerated and by 2017, it reached 1,850 parts per billion (ppb). The annual average for methane (CH_{4}) was 1866 ppb in 2019 and scientists reported with "very high confidence" that concentrations of CH_{4} were higher than at any time in at least 800,000 years. The largest annual increase occurred in 2021 with current concentrations reaching a record 260% of pre-industrial—with the overwhelming percentage caused by human activity.

Since 2006, atmospheric methane concentrations have risen, while the global average δ^{13}C–CH_{4} value has shown a gradual decline. Based on this, the National Oceanic and Atmospheric Administration (NOAA) concluded that the recent methane growth primarily originated from microbial emissions with lighter isotopes such as wetland and agricultural emissions, rather than increased thermal or combustion sources (e.g., fossil fuels).

However, this conclusion is not universally accepted. Changes in isotopes and sinks, such as OH (hydroxyl radicals), indicate that the recent atmospheric methane growth is not dominantly driven by fossil fuels. However, isotopic changes reflect the combined effects of sources and sinks of methane. Thus, the atmospheric δ^{13}C–CH_{4} evolution can be influenced by multiple factors. Lighter δ^{13}C values only indicate relatively greater microbial sources; therefore, they cannot directly rule out concurrent increases in fossil fuel emissions. Several recent inversion models show that emissions from fossil fuels, agriculture, and waste (for example, landfills, manure management and wastewater treatment) can each account for roughly half of the atmospheric increase, with anthropogenic sources (agriculture + fossil fuels) dominating the overall increase. In addition, substantial uncertainties exist in both the δ^{13}C–CH_{4} isotopic fingerprint of sources and the emission estimates themselves, rendering source apportionment results sensitive to prior assumptions. Overall, this is a subject that remains open to scientific debate.

In 2013, IPCC scientists said with "very high confidence", that concentrations of atmospheric methane CH_{4} "exceeded the pre-industrial levels by about 150% which represented "levels unprecedented in at least the last 800,000 years." The globally averaged concentration of methane in Earth's atmosphere increased by about 150% from 722 ± 25 ppb in 1750 to 1803.1 ± 0.6 ppb in 2011. As of 2016, methane contributed radiative forcing of 0.62 ± 14% Wm^{−2}, or about 20% of the total radiative forcing from all of the long-lived and globally mixed greenhouse gases. The atmospheric methane concentration has continued to increase since 2011 to an average global concentration of 1911.8 ± 0.6 ppb as of 2022. The May 2021 peak was 1891.6 ppb, while the April 2022 peak was 1909.4 ppb, a 0.9% increase.

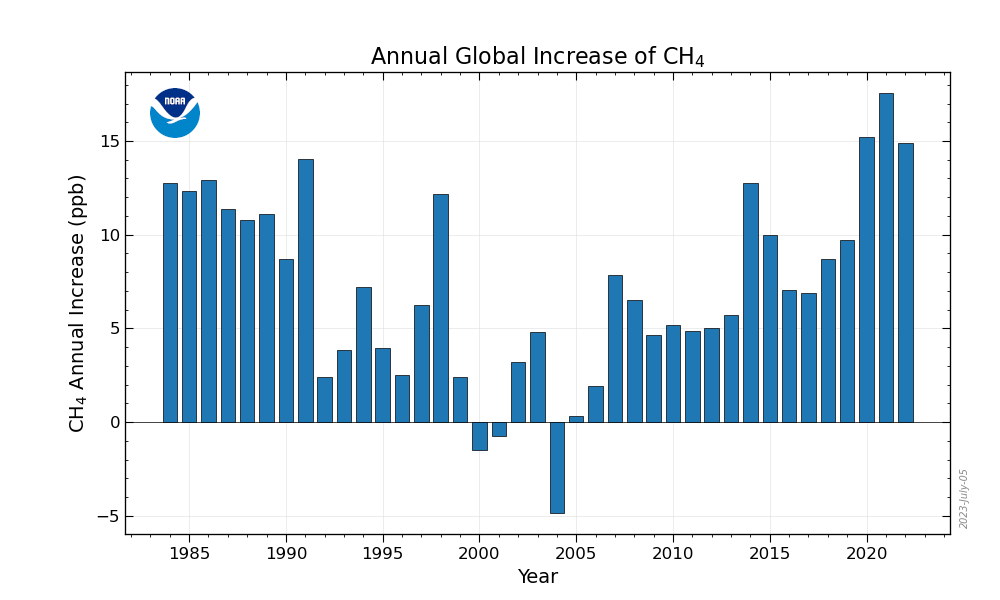
Annual increase atmospheric in methane concentrations from 1984 to 2021

The Global Carbon Project consortium produces the Global Methane Budget. Working with over fifty international research institutions and 100 stations globally, it updates the methane budget every few years.

In 2013, the balance between sources and sinks of methane was not yet fully understood. Scientists were unable to explain why the atmospheric concentration of methane had temporarily ceased to increase.

The focus on the role of methane in anthropogenic climate change has become more relevant since the mid-2010s.

== Natural sinks or removal of atmospheric methane ==
The amount of methane in the atmosphere is the result of a balance between the production of methane on the Earth's surface—its source—and the destruction or removal of methane, mainly in the atmosphere—its sink— in an atmospheric chemical process. Since methane oxidation consumes OH (hydroxyl radicals), higher methane concentrations can reduce global mean OH levels and slightly increase methane's atmospheric lifetime (originally approximately 9 years). This creates a positive feedback between methane sources and sinks that is explicitly considered in contemporary atmospheric chemistry–climate studies.

Carbon isotope analysis allows scientists to identify the source of the carbon in a methane sample by carefully measuring the ratio of the most common form of carbon, carbon-12, and its stable isotope, carbon-13 (13C), which has one extra neutron and is thus heavier. That means 13C is ever so slightly heavier than 12C. By analyzing the isotopic composition of methane in the atmosphere, it is possible to distinguish between microbial, thermal, and combustion sources of methane in atmospheric observations and inversion models.

Another major natural sink is through oxidation by methanotrophic or methane-consuming bacteria in Earth's soils.

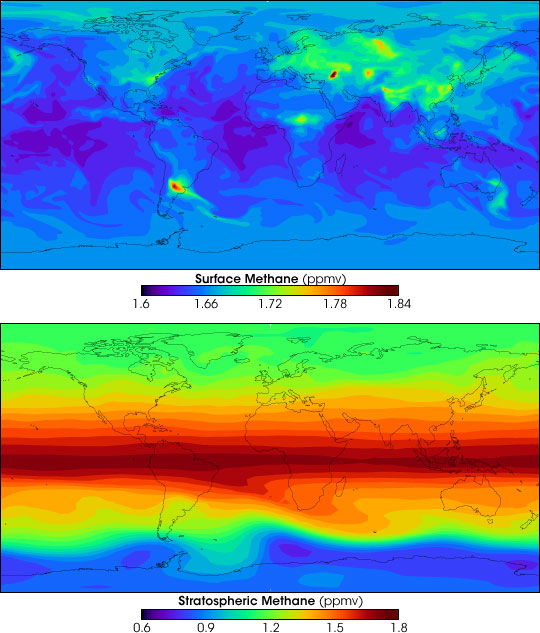
NASA computer models from 2005, calculated based on information available at that time, show the amount of methane (parts per million by volume) at the surface (top) and in the stratosphere (bottom).

These 2005 NASA computer model simulations—calculated based on data available at that time—illustrate how methane is destroyed as it rises.

As air rises in the tropics, methane is carried upwards through the troposphere—the lowest portion of Earth's atmosphere which is 4 miles (6.4 km) to 12 miles (19 km) from the Earth's surface, into the lower stratosphere—the ozone layer—and then the upper portion of the stratosphere.

This atmospheric chemical process is the most effective methane sink, as it removes 90% of atmospheric methane. This global destruction of atmospheric methane mainly occurs in the troposphere.

Methane molecules react with hydroxyl radicals (OH)—the "major chemical scavenger in the troposphere" that "controls the atmospheric lifetime of most gases in the troposphere". Through this CH_{4} oxidation process, atmospheric methane is destroyed and water vapor and carbon dioxide are produced.

While this decreases the concentration of methane in the atmosphere, it is unclear if this leads to a net positive increase in radiative forcing because both water vapor and carbon dioxide are more powerful GHGs factors in terms of affecting the warming of Earth.

This additional water vapor in the stratosphere caused by CH_{4} oxidation, adds approximately 15% to methane's radiative forcing effect.

By the 1980s, the global warming problem had been transformed by the inclusion of methane and other non-CO_{2} trace-gases—CFCs, N_{2}O, and O_{3}— on global warming, instead of focusing primarily on carbon dioxide. Both water and ice clouds, when formed at cold lower stratospheric temperatures, have a significant impact by increasing the atmospheric greenhouse effect. Large increases in future methane could lead to a surface warming that increases nonlinearly with the methane concentration.

Methane also affects the degradation of the ozone layer—the lowest layer of the stratosphere from about 15 to 35 kilometers (9 to 22 mi) above Earth, just above the troposphere. NASA researchers in 2001, had said that this process was enhanced by global warming, because warmer air holds more water vapor than colder air, so the amount of water vapor in the atmosphere increases as it is warmed by the greenhouse effect. Their climate models based on data available at that time, had indicated that carbon dioxide and methane enhanced the transport of water into the stratosphere.

Atmospheric methane could last about 120 years in the stratosphere until it is eventually destroyed through the hydroxyl radicals oxidation process.

=== Mean lifespan ===
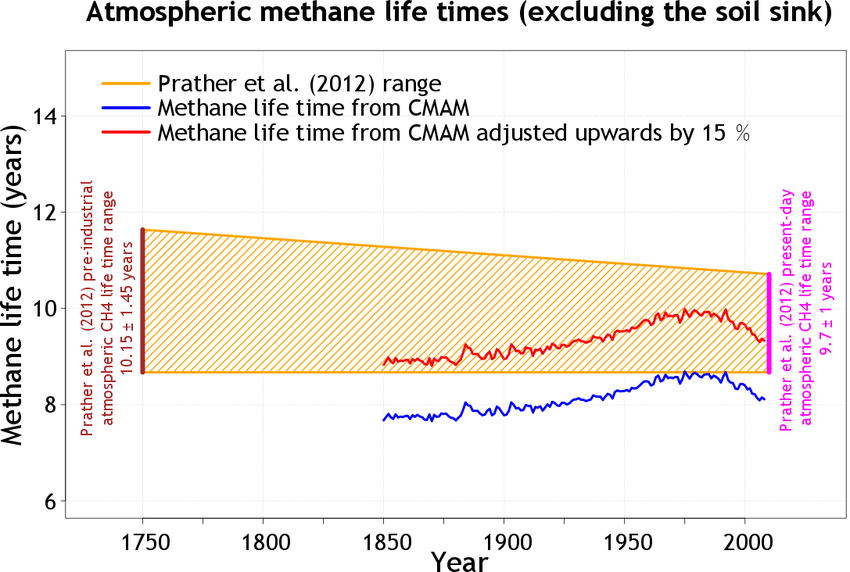
Estimated atmospheric methane lifetime before the industrial era (shaded area); changes in methane lifetime since 1850 as simulated by a climate model (blue line), and the reconciled graph (red line)

There are different ways to quantify the period of time that methane impacts the atmosphere. The average time that a physical methane molecule is in the atmosphere is estimated to be around 9.6 years. However, the average time that the atmosphere will be affected by the emission of that molecule before reaching equilibrium – known as its 'perturbation lifetime' – is approximately twelve years.

The reaction of methane and chlorine atoms acts as a primary sink of Cl atoms and is a primary source of hydrochloric acid (HCl) in the stratosphere.

CH_{4} + Cl → CH_{3} + HCl

The HCl produced in this reaction leads to catalytic ozone destruction in the stratosphere.

=== Methanotrophs in soils and sediments ===
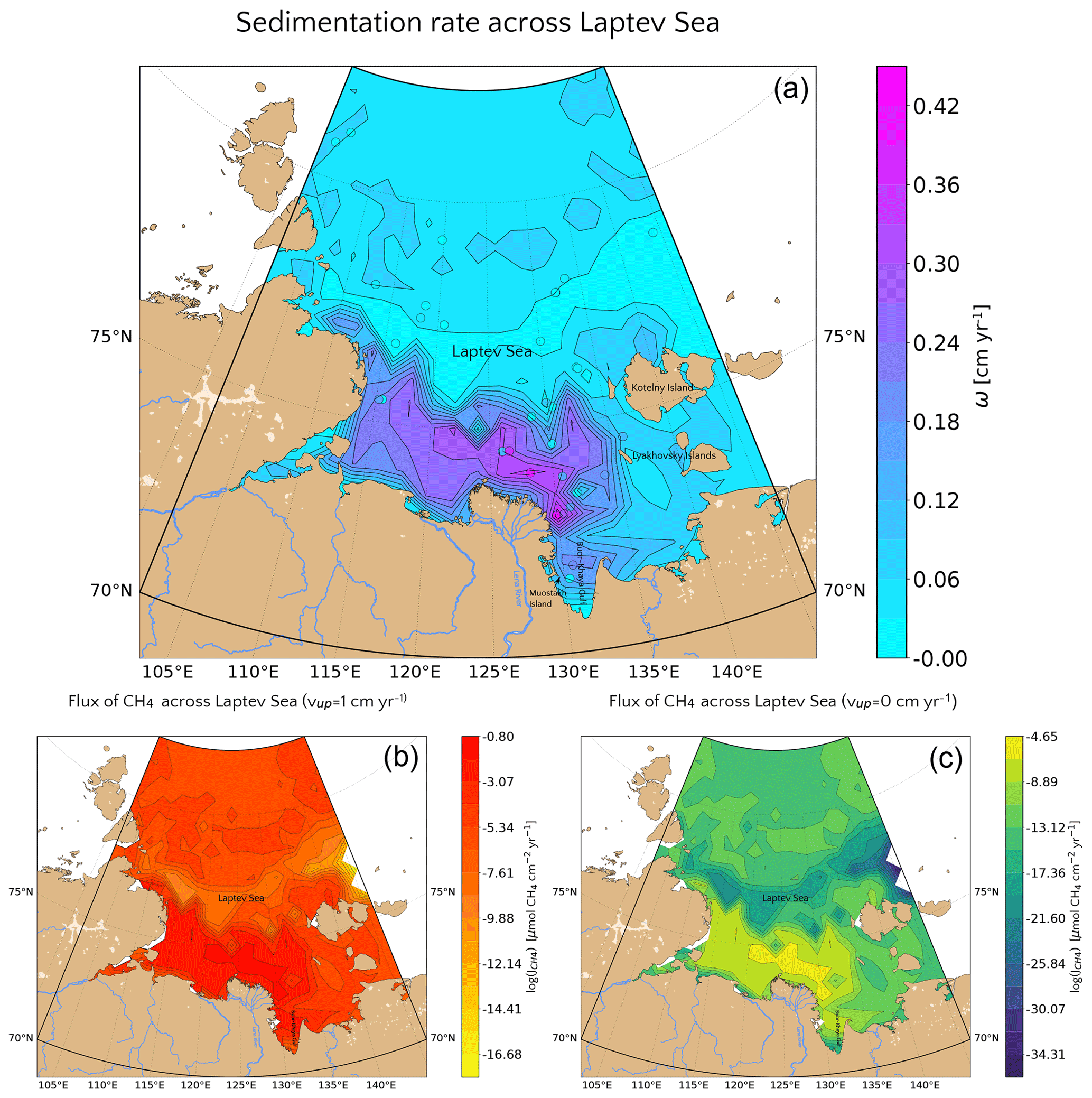
Methane releases in the Laptev Sea are typically consumed within the sediment by methanotrophs. Areas with high sedimentation (top) subject their microbial communities to continual disturbance, and so they are the most likely to see active fluxes, whether with (right) or without active upward flow (left). Even so, the annual release may be limited to 1000 tonnes or less.

Soils act as a major sink for atmospheric methane through the methanotrophic bacteria that reside within them. This occurs with two different types of bacteria. "High capacity-low affinity" methanotrophic bacteria grow in areas of high methane concentration, such as waterlogged soils in wetlands and other moist environments. And in areas of low methane concentration, "low capacity-high affinity" methanotrophic bacteria make use of the methane in the atmosphere to grow, rather than relying on methane in their immediate environment. Methane oxidation allows methanotrophic bacteria to use methane as a source of energy, reacting methane with oxygen and as a result producing carbon dioxide and water.

CH_{4} + 2O_{2} → CO_{2} + 2H_{2}O

Forest soils act as good sinks for atmospheric methane because soils are optimally moist for methanotroph activity, and the movement of gases between soil and atmosphere (soil diffusivity) is high. With a lower water table, any methane in the soil has to make it past the methanotrophic bacteria before it can reach the atmosphere. Wetland soils, however, are often sources of atmospheric methane rather than sinks because the water table is much higher, and the methane can be diffused fairly easily into the air without having to compete with the soil's methanotrophs.

Methanotrophic bacteria also occur in the underwater sediments. Their presence can often efficiently limit emissions from sources such as the underwater permafrost in areas like the Laptev Sea.

=== Removal technologies ===
Atmospheric methane removal is a category of potential approaches being researched to accelerate the breakdown of methane that is in the atmosphere, for mitigating some of the impacts of climate change. Atmospheric methane has increased since pre-industrial times from 0.7 ppm to 1.9 ppm, more than doubling in concentration. The increase in methane from industrialization is linked to natural methane sinks failure in accommodating for the increase in methane due to anthropogenic activities. From 2010 to 2019, methane emissions caused 0.5 °C (about 30%) of observed global warming. Global methane emissions approached a record 600 Tg CH_{4} per year in 2017. Methane is a potent greenhouse gas with a lifetime of up to 12 years. With the ability to undergo reactions converting methane to carbon dioxide which has a lifetime in the hundreds of thousands of years, methane is an impactful greenhouse gas. Atmospheric methane is a more powerful greenhouse gas than carbon dioxide with a global warming potential 34 times higher over and 86 times higher over 20 years. Since methane is a more powerful greenhouse gas, removing smaller amounts of atmospheric methane compared to carbon dioxide from the atmosphere would result in a similar climate impact. With background levels of atmospheric carbon dioxide being approximately 420 ppm and background levels of atmospheric methane being approximately 1.92 ppm, lower concentrations of methane result in an increase in difficulty in methane capture compared to carbon dioxide. Alongside the scarcity of methane in the atmosphere, methane's stability and atmospheric conditions in terms of thermodynamics, kinetics, and mass transfer are large contributing factors in the difficulty of removal. The removal of carbon dioxide from the atmosphere has proven to be impactful in terms of greenhouse gas mitigation efforts, with diverse research efforts and a technological foundation.

An abundance of atmospheric methane removal methods have been studied, including photocatalysts and metal catalysts associated with zeolites and porous polymer networks. Biological-based methane removal methods that have been studied include iron-salt aerosol formation, industrial approaches, and approaches managing soils in a variety of ecosystems. Many of the methane removal methods involve oxidation chemistry, such as thermal-catalytic, photocatalytic, and biological oxidation. The targeted locations for methane destruction include ambient air, methane-enriched air, high-methane air, very high-methane air, and near-explosive air. Descriptions of these targets and their respective atmospheric mixing ratios can be seen in table 1 with information as provided in Nisbet-Jones.

Target	Mixing ratio (ppm)	Example location
Ambient air	1.9 ppm	Anywhere on Earth (0.1 ppm higher in the Northern Hemisphere than the Southern Hemisphere)
Methane-enriched air	10 ppm	In wider vicinities of cattle, directly above large area sources such as wetlands, rice paddies, landfills, and blast zones of an open-cast coal mine.
High-methane air	100 ppm	Above a tank of manure or above feeding troughs in a barn holding cattle.
Very high-methane air	1000 ppm	Near a gas-field dewatering installation or a leaky compressor.
Near-explosive air	1% methane	Near a deliberately venting oil-field installation, leaking gas distribution or landfill gas extraction pipe, etc.

Table 1: This table directly restates information from Nisbet-Jones providing information on different targets for methane detection and the respective mixing ratios and examples listed in the opinion piece.

In order to remove methane from the atmosphere, energy which most likely involves the emission of greenhouse gases is directly involved. This makes some more anthropogenic-based forms of methane removal potentially less productive and more damaging than leaving the methane in the atmosphere. Regardless of potential environmental impacts, costs versus benefits, and other notable factors, all methods of atmospheric methane removal will be thoroughly discussed in this article including related information regarding atmospheric methane removal.

Atmospheric methane removal is generally considered a supplementary climate mitigation strategy rather than a primary solution, as emissions reduction at the source is typically more effective, less-energy intensive, and lower cost. Emissions from sectors such as gas systems, agriculture, and waste management can be reduced by existing technologies such as: leak detection and repair, improved manure management, and landfill gas capture. These methods have been identified as cost effective.The low atmospheric methane concentration (approx 1.9 ppm) means that large volumes of air need to be processed to achieve measurable removal, which can be correlated with higher energy and infrastructure requirements. Marginal abatement cost analyses generally show that methane mitigation measures lower-cost climate actions, whereas atmospheric methane removal technologies are in early stages of development. This can be correlated with higher projected costs and uncertainties. Current research often focuses on emissions reduction, with methane removal considered as a supplementary application.

Methane removal does play a significant role in addressing residual emissions that are difficult to eliminate and to reduce legacy methane already present in the atmosphere. Methane has an atmospheric lifetime of approximately 10-12 years, reducing its concentration can yield relatively rapid climate benefits compared to carbon dioxide mitigation. Large-scale deployment of methane removal technologies face many significant challenges related to scalability, monitoring, and environmental impacts. Engineered systems are constrained by many factors such as the volume of air that can be processed, catalyst efficiency, and overall energy requirements. Additionally, atmospheric approaches, including oxidation, may introduce unintended chemical effects such as changing ozone levels and air quality. Accurately measuring and verifying methane removal at atmospheric scales remains difficult due to natural variability and diffuse nature of methane sources and sinks. These factors contribute to ongoing research regarding long-term feasibility and optimal role of atmospheric methane removal within broader climate mitigation strategies.

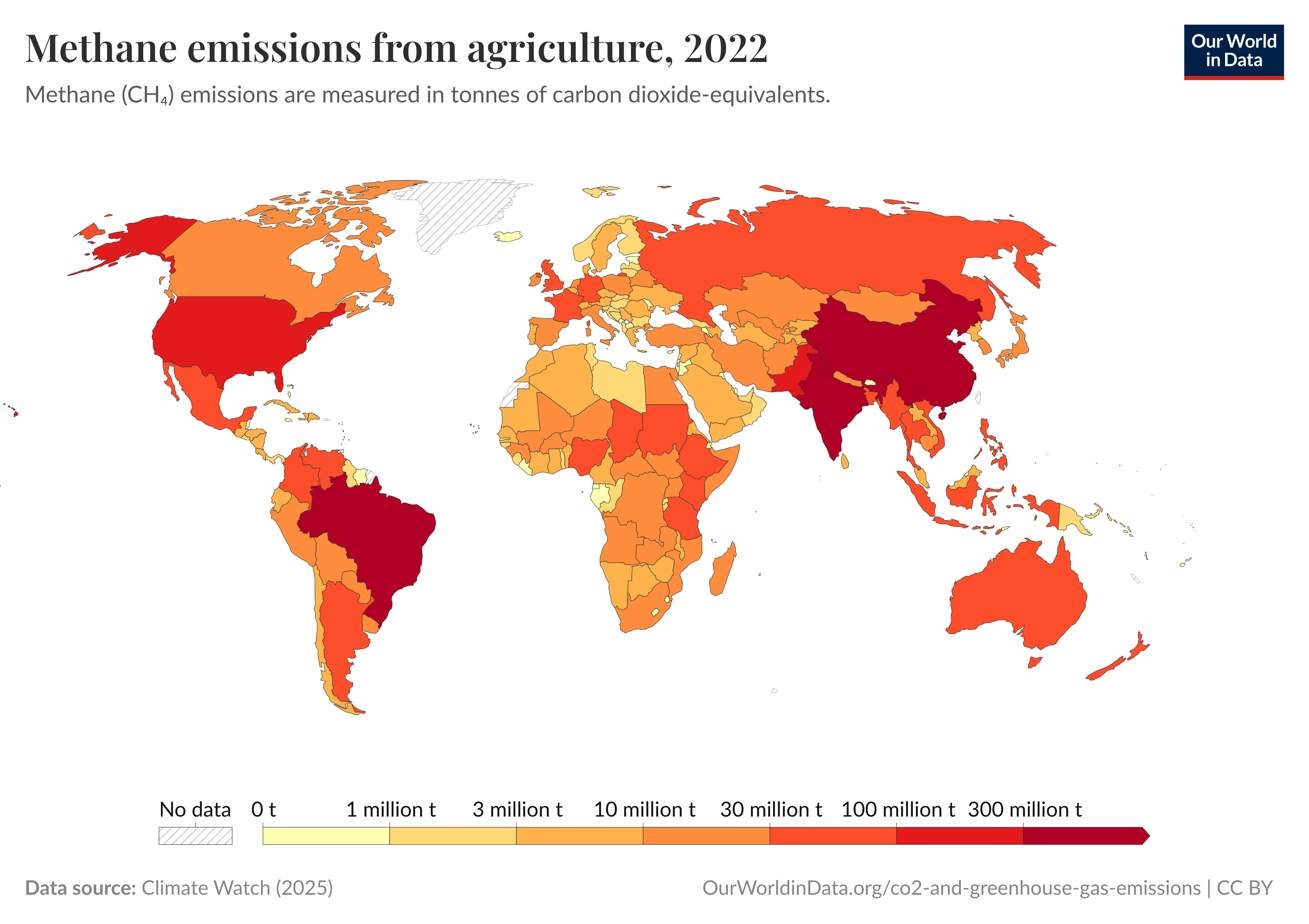
Worldwide methane emissions from agriculture in 2019.

== Methane concentrations in the geologic past ==
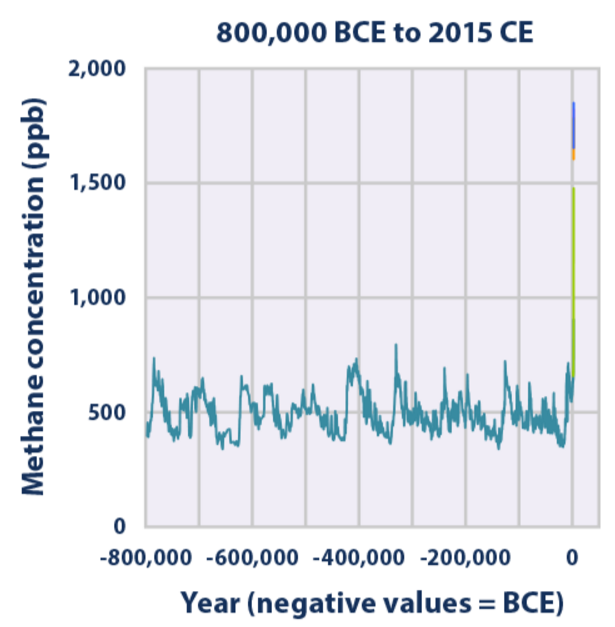
Compilation of paleoclimatology data of methane

From 1996 to 2004, researchers in the European Project for Ice Coring in Antarctica (EPICA) project were able to drill and analyze gases trapped in the ice cores in Antarctica to reconstruct GHG concentrations in the atmosphere over the past 800,000 years". They found that prior to approximately 900,000 years ago, the cycle of ice ages followed by relatively short warm periods lasted about 40,000 years, but by 800,000 years ago the time interval changed dramatically to cycles that lasted 100,000 years. There were low values of GHG in ice ages, and high values during the warm periods.

This 2016 EPA illustration above is a compilation of paleoclimatology showing methane concentrations over time based on analysis of gas bubbles from EPICA Dome C, Antarctica—approximately 797,446 BCE to 1937 CE, Law Dome, Antarctica—approximately 1008 CE to 1980 CE Cape Grim, Australia—1985 CE to 2015 CE Mauna Loa, Hawaii—1984 CE to 2015 CE and Shetland Islands, Scotland: 1993 CE to 2001 CE.

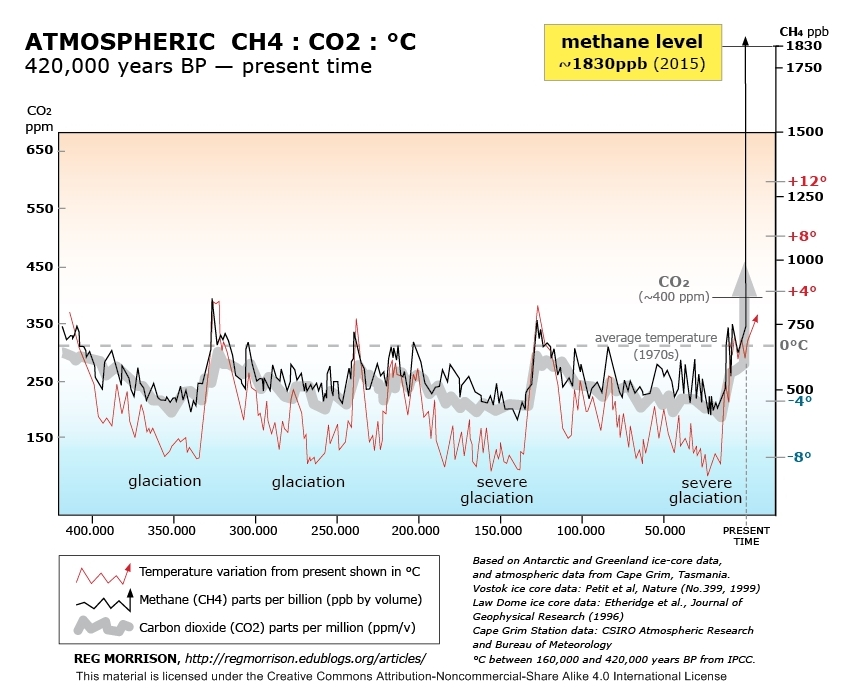
The impact of CH_{4} atmospheric methane concentrations on global temperature increase may be far greater than previously estimated.

The massive and rapid release of large volumes of methane gas from such sediments into the atmosphere has been suggested as a possible cause for rapid global warming events in the Earth's distant past, such as the Paleocene–Eocene Thermal Maximum, and the Great Dying.

In 2001, NASA's Goddard Institute for Space Studies and Columbia University's Center for Climate Systems Research scientists confirmed that other greenhouse gases apart from carbon dioxide were important factors in climate change in research presented at the annual meeting of the American Geophysical Union (AGU). They offered a theory on the 100,000-year long Paleocene–Eocene Thermal Maximum that occurred approximately 55 million years ago. They posited that there was a vast release of methane that had previously been kept stable through "cold temperatures and high pressure...beneath the ocean floor". This methane release into the atmosphere resulted in the warming of the earth. A 2009 journal article in Science, confirmed NASA research that the contribution of methane to global warming had previously been underestimated.

Early in the Earth's history carbon dioxide and methane likely produced a greenhouse effect. The carbon dioxide would have been produced by volcanoes and the methane by early microbes. During this time, Earth's earliest life appeared. According to a 2003 article in the journal Geology, these first, ancient bacteria added to the methane concentration by converting hydrogen and carbon dioxide into methane and water. Oxygen did not become a major part of the atmosphere until photosynthetic organisms evolved later in Earth's history. With no oxygen, methane stayed in the atmosphere longer and at higher concentrations than it does today.
