= Airborne fraction =

The global carbon dioxide partitioning (atmospheric CO_{2}, land sink, and ocean sink) averaged over the historical period (1900–2020)

The airborne fraction is a scaling factor defined as the ratio of the annual increase in atmospheric CO_{2} to the CO_{2} emissions from human sources. It represents the proportion of human emitted CO_{2} that remains in the atmosphere. Observations over the past six decades show that the airborne fraction has remained relatively stable at around 45%. This indicates that the land and ocean's capacity to absorb CO_{2} has kept up with the rise in human CO_{2} emissions, despite the occurrence of notable interannual and sub-decadal variability, which is predominantly driven by the land's ability to absorb CO_{2}. There is some evidence for a recent increase in airborne fraction, which would imply a faster increase in atmospheric CO_{2} for a given rate of human fossil-fuel burning. Changes in carbon sinks can affect the airborne fraction as well.

== Discussion about the trend of airborne fraction ==
Anthropogenic CO_{2} that is released into the atmosphere is partitioned into three components: approximately 45% remains in the atmosphere (referred to as the airborne fraction), while about 24% and 31% are absorbed by the oceans (ocean sink) and terrestrial biosphere (land sink), respectively. If the airborne fraction increases, this indicates that a smaller amount of the CO_{2} released by humans is being absorbed by land and ocean sinks, due to factors such as warming oceans or thawing permafrost. As a result, a greater proportion of anthropogenic emissions remains in the atmosphere, thereby accelerating the rate of climate change. This has implications for future projections of atmospheric CO_{2} levels, which must be adjusted to account for this trend. The question of whether the airborne fraction is rising, remaining steady at approximately 45%, or declining remains a matter of debate. Resolving this question is critical for comprehending the global carbon cycle and has relevance for policymakers and the general public.

The quantity “airborne fraction” is termed by Charles David Keeling in 1973, and studies conducted in the 1970s and 1980s defined airborne fraction from cumulative carbon inventory changes as,

$AF_{FF} = \frac{\frac{dC(t)}{dt}}{FF(t)}$

Or,

$AF_{FF+LU} = \frac{\frac{dC(t)}{dt}}{FF(t)+LU(t)}$

In which C is atmospheric carbon dioxide, t is time, FF is fossil-fuel emissions and LU is the emission to the atmosphere due to land use change.

At present, studies examining the trends in airborne fraction are producing contradictory outcomes, with emissions linked to land use and land cover change representing the most significant source of uncertainty. Some studies show that there is no statistical evidence of an increasing airborne fraction and calculated airborne fraction as,

$AF = \frac{G_t}{E_{FF}+E_{LUC}}$

Where G_{t} is growth of atmospheric CO_{2} concentration, E_{FF} is the fossil-fuel emissions flux, E_{LUC} is the land use change emissions flux.

Another argument was presented that the airborne fraction of CO_{2} released by human activities, particularly through fossil-fuel emissions, cement production, and land-use changes, is on the rise. Since 1959, the average CO_{2} airborne fraction has been 0.43, but it has shown an increase of approximately 0.2% per year over that period.

The trend analyses of airborne fraction may be affected by external natural occurrences, such as the El Niño-Southern Oscillation (ENSO), volcanic eruptions, and other similar events. It is possible that the methodologies used in these studies to analyze the trend of airborne fraction are not robust, and therefore, the conclusions drawn from them are not warranted.

== See also ==
- Greenhouse gas
- Carbon dioxide in Earth's atmosphere
- Total Carbon Column Observing Network
- Atmospheric carbon cycle
