= Atmospheric methane removal =

Potential method of reducing climate change

Atmospheric methane removal is a category of potential approaches being researched to accelerate the breakdown of methane that is in the atmosphere, for mitigating some of the impacts of climate change. Atmospheric methane has increased since pre-industrial times from 0.7 ppm to 1.9 ppm, more than doubling in concentration. The increase in methane from industrialization is linked to natural methane sinks failure in accommodating for the increase in methane due to anthropogenic activities. From 2010 to 2019, methane emissions caused 0.5 °C (about 30%) of observed global warming. Global methane emissions approached a record 600 Tg CH_{4} per year in 2017. Methane is a potent greenhouse gas with a lifetime of up to 12 years. With the ability to undergo reactions converting methane to carbon dioxide which has a lifetime in the hundreds of thousands of years, methane is an impactful greenhouse gas. Atmospheric methane is a more powerful greenhouse gas than carbon dioxide with a global warming potential 34 times higher over and 86 times higher over 20 years. Since methane is a more powerful greenhouse gas, removing smaller amounts of atmospheric methane compared to carbon dioxide from the atmosphere would result in a similar climate impact. With background levels of atmospheric carbon dioxide being approximately 420 ppm and background levels of atmospheric methane being approximately 1.92 ppm, lower concentrations of methane result in an increase in difficulty in methane capture compared to carbon dioxide. Alongside the scarcity of methane in the atmosphere, methane's stability and atmospheric conditions in terms of thermodynamics, kinetics, and mass transfer are large contributing factors in the difficulty of removal. The removal of carbon dioxide from the atmosphere has proven to be impactful in terms of greenhouse gas mitigation efforts, with diverse research efforts and a technological foundation.

An abundance of atmospheric methane removal methods have been studied, including photocatalysts and metal catalysts associated with zeolites and porous polymer networks. Biological-based methane removal methods that have been studied include iron-salt aerosol formation, industrial approaches, and approaches managing soils in a variety of ecosystems. Many of the methane removal methods involve oxidation chemistry, such as thermal-catalytic, photocatalytic, and biological oxidation. The targeted locations for methane destruction include ambient air, methane-enriched air, high-methane air, very high-methane air, and near-explosive air. Descriptions of these targets and their respective atmospheric mixing ratios can be seen in table 1 with information as provided in Nisbet-Jones.

| Target | Mixing ratio (ppm) | Example location |
| Ambient air | 1.9 ppm | Anywhere on Earth (0.1 ppm higher in the Northern Hemisphere than the Southern Hemisphere) |
| Methane-enriched air | 10 ppm | In wider vicinities of cattle, directly above large area sources such as wetlands, rice paddies, landfills, and blast zones of an open-cast coal mine. |
| High-methane air | 100 ppm | Above a tank of manure or above feeding troughs in a barn holding cattle. |
| Very high-methane air | 1000 ppm | Near a gas-field dewatering installation or a leaky compressor. |
| Near-explosive air | 1% methane | Near a deliberately venting oil-field installation, leaking gas distribution or landfill gas extraction pipe, etc. |

Table 1: This table directly restates information from Nisbet-Jones providing information on different targets for methane detection and the respective mixing ratios and examples listed in the opinion piece.

In order to remove methane from the atmosphere, energy which most likely involves the emission of greenhouse gases is directly involved. This makes some more anthropogenic-based forms of methane removal potentially less productive and more damaging than leaving the methane in the atmosphere. Regardless of potential environmental impacts, costs versus benefits, and other notable factors, all methods of atmospheric methane removal will be thoroughly discussed in this article including related information regarding atmospheric methane removal.

Atmospheric methane removal is generally considered a supplementary climate mitigation strategy rather than a primary solution, as emissions reduction at the source is typically more effective, less-energy intensive, and lower cost. Emissions from sectors such as gas systems, agriculture, and waste management can be reduced by existing technologies such as: leak detection and repair, improved manure management, and landfill gas capture. These methods have been identified as cost effective.The low atmospheric methane concentration (approx 1.9 ppm) means that large volumes of air need to be processed to achieve measurable removal, which can be correlated with higher energy and infrastructure requirements. Marginal abatement cost analyses generally show that methane mitigation measures lower-cost climate actions, whereas atmospheric methane removal technologies are in early stages of development. This can be correlated with higher projected costs and uncertainties. Current research often focuses on emissions reduction, with methane removal considered as a supplementary application.

Methane removal does play a significant role in addressing residual emissions that are difficult to eliminate and to reduce legacy methane already present in the atmosphere. Methane has an atmospheric lifetime of approximately 10-12 years, reducing its concentration can yield relatively rapid climate benefits compared to carbon dioxide mitigation. Large-scale deployment of methane removal technologies face many significant challenges related to scalability, monitoring, and environmental impacts. Engineered systems are constrained by many factors such as the volume of air that can be processed, catalyst efficiency, and overall energy requirements. Additionally, atmospheric approaches, including oxidation, may introduce unintended chemical effects such as changing ozone levels and air quality. Accurately measuring and verifying methane removal at atmospheric scales remains difficult due to natural variability and diffuse nature of methane sources and sinks. These factors contribute to ongoing research regarding long-term feasibility and optimal role of atmospheric methane removal within broader climate mitigation strategies.

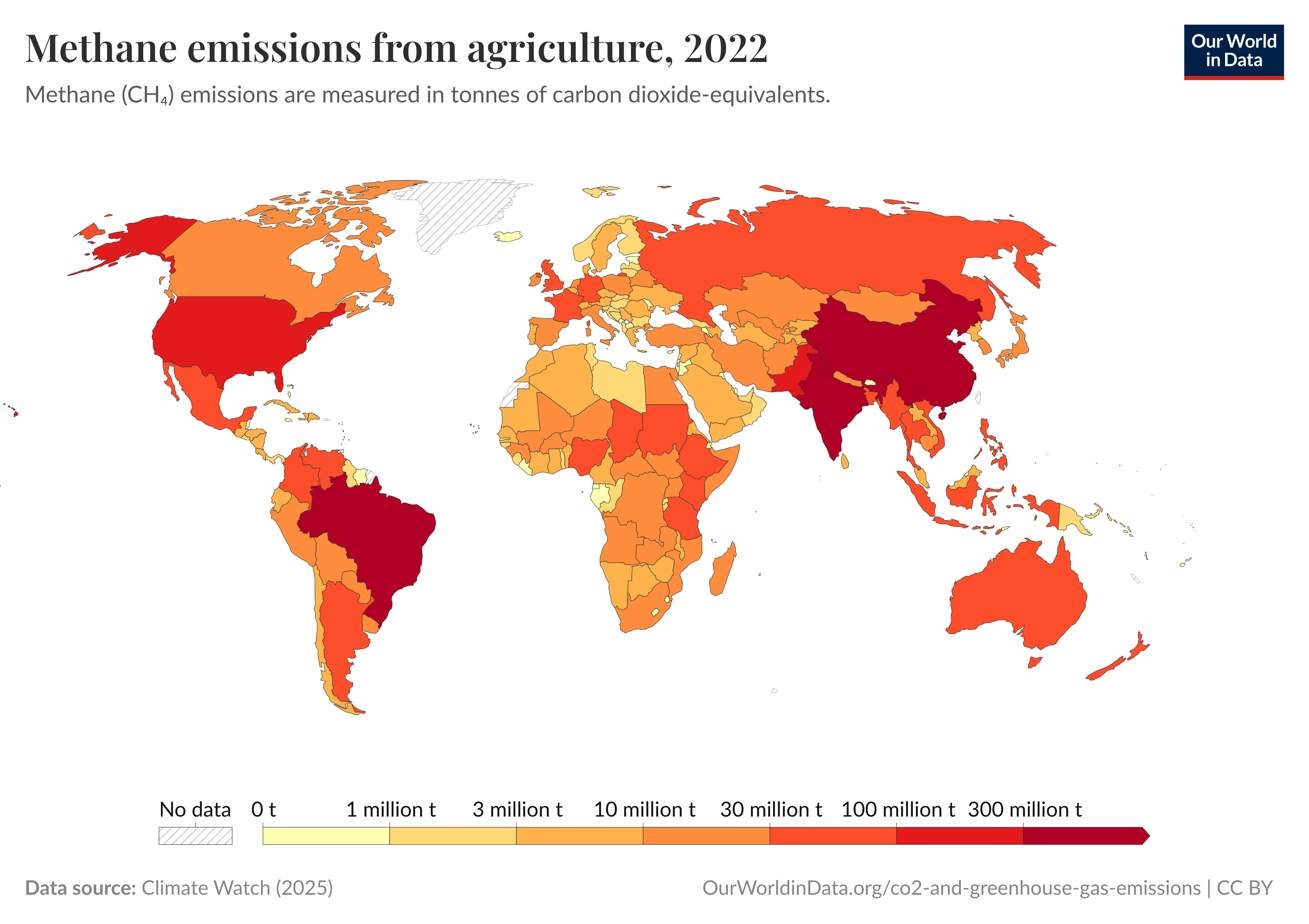
Worldwide methane emissions from agriculture in 2019.

== Natural atmospheric methane sinks ==
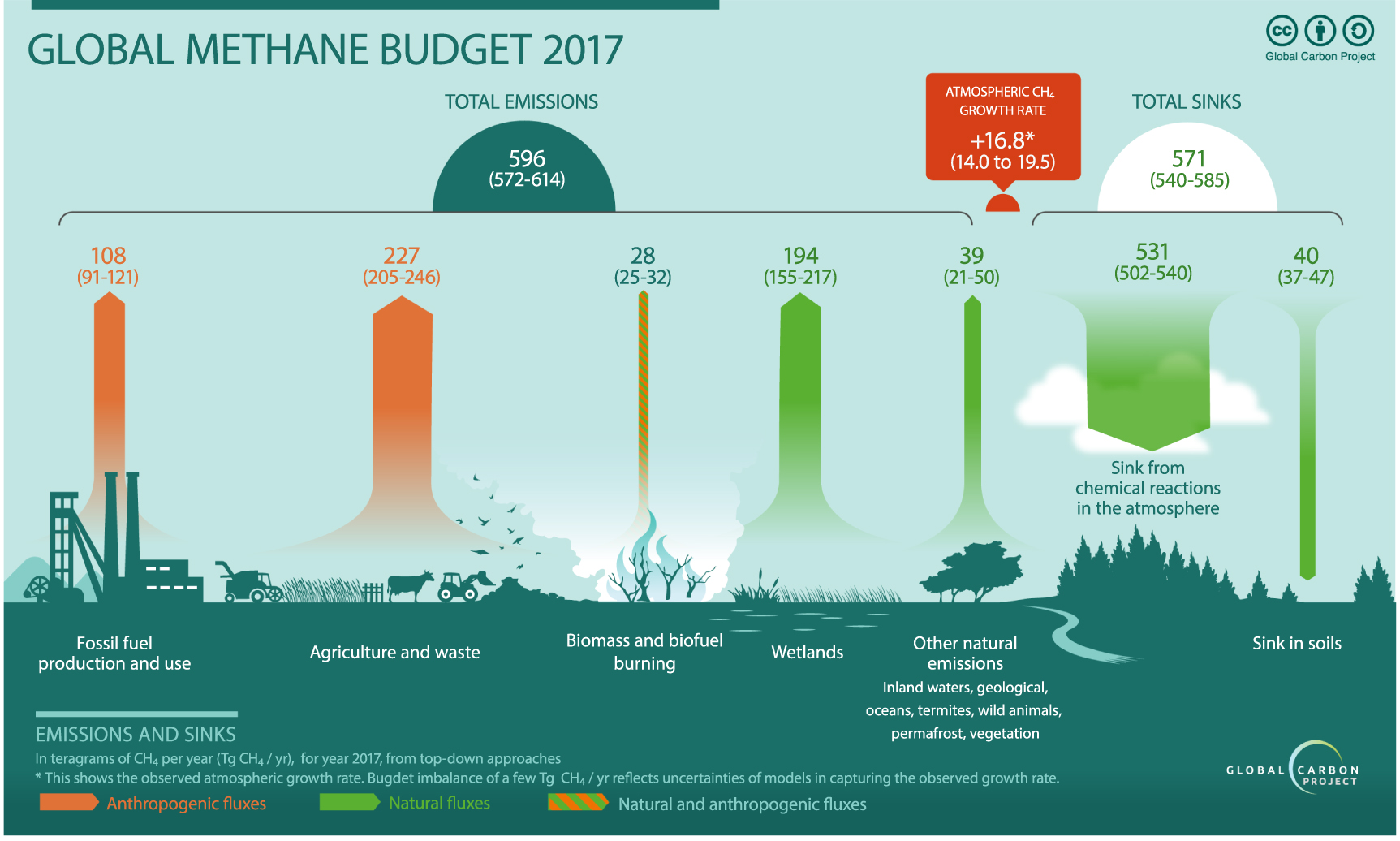
Global Methane Budget 2017, showing methane sinks

Methane has a limited atmospheric lifetime of about 10 years due to substantial methane sinks. The primary methane sink is atmospheric oxidation, from hydroxyl radicals (OH) (~90% of the total sink) and chlorine radicals (0-5% of the total sink). The rest is consumed by methanotrophs and other methane-oxidizing bacteria and archaea in soils (~5%). Chemical reactions in the atmosphere such as tropospheric reactions, stratospheric reactions, and soil uptake prove to be efficient sinks of methane resulting in permanent loss.

=== Tropospheric and stratospheric reactions ===
==== Tropospheric reactions ====
Tropospheric reactions that act as natural atmospheric methane sinks primarily governed by halogen atoms that oxidize methane. Atomic chlorine (Cl) is a halogen that is widely contributional, especially when there is high activity due to seasonal variation that occurs in the boundary layer. Sodium chloride (NaCl) in coastal and marine regions evaporates from drops of seawater after reacting with nitrogen dioxide (NO_{2}) to form diatomic chlorine (Cl_{2}), which undergoes photolytic reactions to produce atomic chlorine. Atomic chlorine radicals are highly reactive and have the ability to interact with methane in such a way that destroys the compound.

==== Stratospheric reactions ====
Methane is lost in the atmosphere by reactions with excited atomic oxygen (O('D)), Cl, atomic fluorine (F), and OH. It is assumed that of the oxidation in the stratosphere, nearly 20% to 35% of the oxidation is due to halons, 25% is due to O('D) in the high stratosphere, and the rest of the oxidation in the stratosphere is due to stratospheric OH.

=== Soil uptake ===
Soil uptake involving unsaturated oxic-soils are methane sinks due to the presence of methanotrophic bacteria, which consume methane as a source of energy. A model used to study the uptake of methane in soils reflected an uptake of approximately 32 Teragrams per year. Soil uptake of methane is additionally impacted by the additional mechanisms of aqueous diffusion and plant mediated transport.

== Potential approaches ==
Different methods to remove methane from the atmosphere include thermal-catalytic oxidation, photocatalytic oxidation, biological methanotrophic methane removal, concentration with zeolites or other porous solids, and separation by membranes. Potential methods can be categorized by the underlying catalytic process, or the potential deployment form.

=== Enhanced Atmospheric Methane Oxidation ===
Enhanced atmospheric methane oxidation is the concept of enhancing the overall oxidative methane sink in the atmosphere through the generation of additional OH or Cl radicals. The methods of enhanced atmospheric methane oxidation encapsulate most of the atmospheric methane removal techniques.

==== Iron salt aerosols ====
Iron salt aerosols (ISA) are one proposed method of enhanced atmospheric methane oxidation which involves lofting iron-based particles into the atmosphere (e.g. from planes or ships) to enhance atmospheric chlorine radicals, a natural methane sink. Winds over the Sahara raise dust into the troposphere and disperse it over the Atlantic, supplying the atmosphere with particulate matter consisting of iron-based particles. A study done in 2023 suggests that this has contributed to natural atmospheric methane oxidation. This method has yet to be tested in a field setting, but a variety of research studies have been performed involving ISA. Research methods have been conducted by laboratory experiments, observational analysis, and numerical modeling to evaluate the potential impact of ISAs.

ISAs are being studied for the potential of iron(III) chloride (FeCl_{3}) to catalyze chlorine radical production. Cl atoms are produced by photolysis from the FeCl_{3} stemming from iron-containing airborne dust aerosol particles in the oceanic boundary layer.

FeCl_{3} + hv → FeCl_{2} + ^{o}Cl

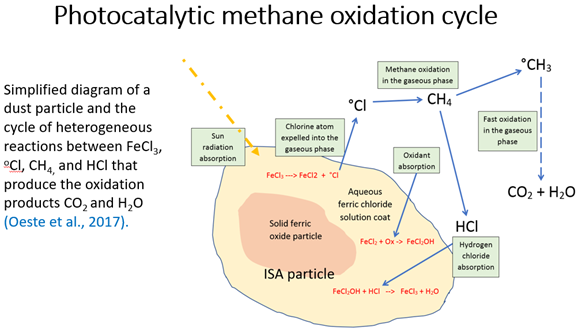
Atmospheric methane removal with FeCl_{3}

The Cl atoms initiate methane oxidation:

CH_{4} + ^{o}Cl → HCl + ^{o}CH_{3}

The resulting methyl radical is unstable and oxidizes naturally to CO_{2} and water:

3.5O_{2} + 2^{o}CH_{3} → 2CO_{2} + 3H_{2}O

Side effects of iron(III) chloride

Enhanced Cl in the troposphere has the potential to lead to beneficial reductions of methane in the troposphere. Increased concentrations of Cl in the troposphere may additionally lead to reduced OH radical concentrations, increasing the lifetime of harmful species in the atmosphere that are detrimental to human health. The impacts of ISAs on the stratosphere could potentially result in ozone destruction, damaging the ozone layer. Factors related to the fate of Cl involved in ISA processes are fairly unpredictable and require more research, as additional Cl in the atmosphere may be a threat to coastal communities, biological life, and ocean acidification. Eventually all iron(III) chloride particles undergo wer-deposition and fall on land or water, where they dissolve into iron compounds and salt. Upon washing out, iron salt aerosols may also therefore contribute to iron fertilization. Fine particles dispersed in the atmosphere can serve as cloud condensation nuclei and thereby cause marine cloud brightening and can cause changes to Earth's albedo.

Additional findings from the past ISA research and other sources suggest more research on the impact of ISA on human health, feasibility, and further assessment of impact on environmental factors. The governance and social impacts regarding atmospheric methane removal essential in properly executing potential solutions.

=== Terrestrial methanotroph enhancement ===
Soil bacteria and archaea account for approximately 5% of the natural methane sink. Early research is going into how the activity of these bacteria may be able to be enhanced, either through the use of soil amendments, or introduction of selected or engineered methane-oxidizing bacteria. Microbes prove to be the second-largest natural sink for atmospheric methane, accumulating approximately 40 Teragrams of methane on an annual basis. Anaerobic archaea and aerobic methanotrophs bacteria possess enzymes that oxidize methane, those being methane monooxygenase and methyl coenzyme M reductase. Studies have supported the idea of methanotrophs being able to couple the direct anaerobic oxidation of methane to denitrification of nitrate (NO_{3}^{-}). Biologically based methane-to-methane conversions are of interest in systems such as waste-water treatment where methanol is used to enhance denitrification rates.

Research has been done involving the atmospheric removal of methane in agricultural soils, non-agricultural soils, and artificial substrates. A study showed biochar derived from rice straw reduced methane emissions from paddy soils by 40% in microcosm experiments, with the decrease being linked to decreased activity of methanogens and increased methane oxidation activity of methanotrophs. An addition of sulfate was shown to reduce the methane emissions from rice paddies as well in this study, showing another potential lead for a decrease in methane production.

Bio-trickling filters have been examined as a method for methane removal from the atmosphere for point source pollution. The filtration system uses methane-consuming bacteria to oxidize the methane present in the atmosphere. Bio-covers and biofilters with methanotrophs are currently in use for some point source pollution sites like smaller and older landfills for methane mitigation.

=== Catalytic engineered systems ===
Catalytic engineered systems are designed to pass air from the atmosphere, either passively or actively, through catalytic systems which leverage energy from the sun, an artificial light, or heat to oxidize methane. These catalysts include thermo-catalysts, photocatalysts, and radicals produced artificially through photolysis (using light to break apart a molecule).

Photocatalysts have the ability to oxidize methane and other hydrocarbons through heterogeneous catalysts. titanium dioxide (TiO_{2}) is a catalyst that is photolytically active when exposed to ultraviolet (UV) radiation and can catalyze the same reaction that occurs when methane is burned"

CH_{4} + 2O_{2}→ 2H_{2}O + CO_{2}

Photocatalytic materials are used to dope surface paints with TiO_{2} and zinc oxide (ZnO). This method has been studied for the oxidation of volatile organic compounds (VOCs) and nitric oxide (NO) in urban and indoor environments. The use of this method has not been widely studied for methane removal, but the low efficiency of the method involving methane oxidation provides a barrier. Greater research involving photocatalytic material and methane interactions may result in significant low-cost findings in methane removal by oxidation.

Metal catalysts include Cu- and Fe- zeolites and porous polymer networks that have the ability to oxidize methane and convert methane to methanol (CH_{3}OH), which has a shorter lifetime than methane. The interaction of methane with zeolites is weaker, as it relies only on Van Der Waals interactions with oxygen atoms on the walls of the zeolite lattice. Metal and other catalysts can be deposited on or embedded in the porous polymer networks, which are synthesized so that functional groups on the polymer backbone interact with methane in the micropores of the network.

=== Methane reactors ===
Methane reactors are systems that are designed to remove methane from ambient air due to low efficiencies and operational issues that involve catalyst poisoning and regeneration. Methane reactors have an air inlet and methane conversion, acting as a cost efficient and highly effective method for methane removal. The catalysts use light, heat, and radicals to oxidize high-concentrations of methane into methyl products. This method has been used since the 1920s and has proven to be efficient. Overall, the methane reactors are cost-limiting due to inefficiencies at lower methane concentrations, making them most useful in locations with higher concentrations.
