= Environmental policy of the first Trump administration =

The environmental policy of the first Donald Trump administration represented a shift from the policy priorities and goals of the preceding Barack Obama administration. Where President Obama's environmental agenda prioritized the reduction of carbon emissions through the use of renewable energy with the goal of conserving the environment for future generations, the Trump administration policy was for the US to attain energy independence based on fossil fuel use and to rescind many environmental regulations. By the end of Trump's term, his administration had rolled back 98 environmental rules and regulations, leaving an additional 14 rollbacks still in progress. As of early 2021, the Biden administration was making a public accounting of regulatory decisions under the Trump administration that had been influenced by politics rather than science.

The Trump administration supported energy development on federal land, including gas and oil drilling in national forests and near national monuments and parks. Soon after taking office, Trump began to implement his "America First Energy Plan" and signed executive orders to approve two controversial oil pipelines. In 2018, the Department of the Interior announced plans to allow drilling in nearly all U.S. waters, the largest expansion of offshore oil and gas leasing ever proposed. In 2019, the Administration completed plans for opening the entire coastal plain of the Arctic National Wildlife Refuge to drilling.

Trump and his cabinet appointees did not believe the consensus of most scientists that climate change will have catastrophic impacts nor that carbon dioxide is a primary contributor to climate change. Trump pulled the United States out of the Paris climate accord, leaving the U.S. one of two nations that were not part of the agreement. He avoided environmental discussions at both the 44th G7 summit held in Canada and the 45th G7 summit held in France by departing early from these conferences. In September 2019, the Trump administration replaced the Obama-era Clean Power Plan with the Affordable Clean Energy rule, which did not cap emissions. In April 2020, he issued his new vehicle emissions standards, which were projected to result in an additional billion tons of carbon dioxide, increasing annual U.S. emissions by about one-fifth. In 2020, environmentalists feared that a successful reelection of Trump could have resulted in severe and irreversible changes in the climate.

The administration repealed the Clean Water Rule and rewrote the EPA's pollution-control policies—including policies on chemicals known to be serious health risks—particularly benefiting the chemicals industry. A 2018 analysis reported that the Trump administration's rollbacks and proposed reversals of environmental rules would likely "cost the lives of over 80,000 US residents per decade and lead to respiratory problems for many more than 1 million people."

== Background ==
Donald J. Trump
(@realDonaldTrump)
tweeted:

The concept of global warming was created by and for the Chinese to make U.S. manufacturing non-competitive.

November 6, 2012

At a Republican primary debate in Detroit on March 3, 2016, Trump said: "Department of Environmental Protection: We are going to get rid of it in almost every form." During the campaign, Trump expressed the view that global warming and cooling is a natural process. He often described global warming as a "hoax"; and sometimes attributed the "hoax" to the Chinese government as a plot to sabotage American manufacturing, but later claimed that had been a joke. As a candidate Trump said he would rescind Obama's Climate Action Plan, cancel U.S. participation in the Paris Climate Agreement, and stop all U.S. payments towards United Nations global warming programs.

Within days after taking office, he invited American manufacturers to suggest which regulations should be eliminated; industry leaders submitted 168 comments, of which nearly half targeted Environmental Protection Agency (EPA) rules. Within his first couple months in office, he required a federal review of the Clean Water Rule and the Clean Power Plan.

He did not attend the climate discussions held during both the 2018 and 2019 G7 meetings, the only G7 leader not in attendance.

== Appointments ==
Trump's cabinet nominees reflect his desire to scale back federal environmental regulation and to promote domestic production of coal, oil, and natural gas. In some cases his appointees had a history of conflict with the agencies they now lead. Although the scientific conclusion is that "it is extremely likely (95 to 100 percent probable) that human influence has been the dominant cause of the observed warming since the mid-20th century," Trump's department head appointees do not agree that global warming has been man-made.

President Trump's appointments to key agencies dealing in energy and environmental policy reflect his commitment to deregulation, particularly of the fossil fuel industry. Three of the four chair-level members of Trump's first transition team commissioned to draw up a list of proposals to guide his Native American policies had links to the oil industry. In July 2018, amid numerous ethics investigations, Trump's first appointment for administrator of the Environmental Protection Agency (EPA), Scott Pruitt, resigned and was replaced by Andrew Wheeler.

=== First EPA administrator, Scott Pruitt ===
As the attorney general of Oklahoma, Trump's choice of EPA administrator Scott Pruitt challenged EPA regulations in court more than a dozen times. With some cases still pending, Pruitt declined to say if he would recuse himself with regard to those suits. Pruitt hired former Oklahoma banker Albert Kelly to head the Superfund program, which is responsible for cleaning up the nation's most contaminated land. Kelly completely lacked any experience with environmental issues, and had just received a lifetime ban from working in banking, his career until then, due to "unfitness to serve".

Pruitt said he planned to prioritize state and local control over federal land use and ease regulations on the environmental impacts of industries. A March 2017 executive order allowed Pruitt to start a review process of the Obama administration's regulations of the coal industry, reflecting Trump's repeated promises to support the coal industry and "bring back jobs" in coal mining. Such changes are likely to affect America's ability to meet the climate emission goals of the Paris Agreement.

In April 2018, Pruitt drew criticism for what some consider to be the excessive security expenditures which he had requested. Trump defended Pruitt in a tweet stating, "Record clean Air & Water while saving USA Billions of Dollars." However, according to PolitiFact no new figures on air quality have been released since 2016. To state the nation's waters as being at record clean levels is also inaccurate since while a report was issued in 2017, the information was gathered in 2012 or earlier. Commenting on Pruitt's claim that his excessive security expenses are related to his need for security, The New York Times commented that the high expenses appear to be "driven more by a desire to avoid tough questions from the public than by concerns about security." In April 2018, thirty-nine members of the Senate and more than 130 members of the House of Representatives called for Pruitt's resignation.

On July 5, 2018, President Trump accepted Pruitt's resignation. At the time of his resignation Pruitt was facing numerous ethics investigations.

=== Second EPA administrator, Andrew Wheeler ===
In 2017 Trump nominated Andrew Wheeler to be the deputy administrator of the EPA. Wheeler has worked as a coal industry lobbyist, specializing in energy and environmental policy. He is a critic of nationwide limits on greenhouse gas emissions and has supported the continued use of fossil fuels. The Senate rejected him in 2017 and Trump resubmitted his name in January 2018. His nomination was confirmed on April 12, 2018, by a mostly party line vote of 53–45, that included three Democratic senators. Following Pruitt's resignation, Wheeler was appointed to head the EPA on July 5, 2018.

Following his appointment Sierra Club executive director Michael Brune commented, "He fought against safeguards to limit mercury poisoning. He fought against protections to limit the amount of ozone in our skies. He fought against air pollution from neighboring states. He's a climate denier. So, sadly, he fits in well with EPA leadership."

=== Department of Energy ===
The United States Department of Energy is tasked with developing technology for better and more efficient energy sources as well as energy education. Trump chose Rick Perry to head the department, who had called for eliminating it when he was running for the Republican nomination for president in 2012. His confirmation as head of the Department of Energy was a source of contention among Democrats due to his previous denial of man-made climate change and his close ties to the Texas oil and gas industry. During his confirmation hearing, Perry said he regretted his promise to abolish the Department of Energy.

In March 2017, Perry met with Murray Energy CEO Robert Murray and coal lobbyist Andrew Wheeler who would later replace Scott Pruitt as head of the EPA. Murray submitted a confidential "action plan" at the meeting. In an interview with the Associated Press (AP) Simon Edelman, who was at the time a government photographer who was taking photos of the meeting, the actions Murray wanted the Trump administration to take "included replacing members of the Federal Energy Regulatory Commission, pulling the United States out of the Paris climate accords and revoking the Clean Power Plan." He said that he was fired shortly after he released the photographs of the meeting. A copy of the plan was obtained by The New York Times and the AP in January 2018. They reported that "it mirrors policy later pushed by the Trump administration."

=== Department of the Interior ===
Ryan Zinke was appointed Secretary of the Interior in 2017. Following his appointment, Zinke said that he had made "probably the greatest reorganization in the history of the Department of the Interior." Some scientists charged that some of the staff changes were politically motivated. Zinke supported Trump's plan to reduce the DOI budget by $1.6 billion (~$1.96 billion in 2024) in 2018, which would have caused roughly 4,000 employees to lose their jobs and a rollback of many of the regulations that Obama put in place. When questioned about global warming during his senate confirmation hearing, Zinke replied, "I don't know definitively, there's a lot of debate on both sides of the aisle."

In January 2019, Zinke was replaced with David Bernhardt, an attorney and oil industry lobbyist who had been serving as Trump's United States Deputy Secretary of the Interior since 2017. At his confirmation hearing, speaking regarding his policy decisions related to global warming he said, "We're going to look at the science whatever it is, but ... policy decisions are made – this president ran and he won on a particular perspective." During Bernhardt's tenure as deputy secretary and acting secretary, the department embarked on a program of deregulation and substantially increased fossil fuel sales on public land. In March 2019, Politico reported that heads of the oil industry lobbyist group Independent Petroleum Association of America (IPAA) boasted about their ties to Bernhardt.

=== Department of Agriculture ===
Sonny Perdue, former governor of Georgia, was appointed Agriculture Secretary. His supporters say that his experience in agriculture and conservative views on immigration make him an appropriate choice. Perdue says that he plans to rid the department of "onerous regulations" that do not contribute to a better environment. Opponents fear that he will not sufficiently address the effects that farm pollution has on sources of drinking water. Speaking on climate change, Perdue says that he agrees that the climate is warming but "we don't know definitively in my opinion what is causing climate change."

=== Council on Environmental Quality ===
The Council on Environmental Quality is a division of the Executive Office of the President that coordinates federal environmental efforts and works closely with agencies and other White House offices on the development of environmental and energy policies and initiatives. In October 2017, Trump nominated Kathleen Hartnett White, former chair of the Texas Commission on Environmental Quality, to be chair of CEQ. Some of Hartnett's energy views have been considered controversial. She has "called renewable energy unreliable and parasitic" and she has "suggested that climate regulation is a conspiracy pushed by communists." Her nomination was withdrawn in February 2018 as she did not garner enough support in the Senate.

=== National Oceanic and Atmospheric Administration ===
Trump nominated Barry Lee Myers to head the National Oceanic and Atmospheric Administration (NOAA). NOAA is a scientific agency within the United States Department of Commerce that warns of dangerous weather, focuses on the conditions of the atmosphere, oceans and major waterways, and guides the use and protection of ocean and coastal resources. Myers is an attorney and businessman who has served as CEO of AccuWeather, a company that provides commercial weather forecasting services. In the past, he has strongly advocated against NOAA's capability to provide a weather information service directly to the public via the National Weather Service.

Myers nomination has not been confirmed and Neil Jacobs has been serving as active Under Secretary of Commerce for Oceans and Atmosphere since February 25, 2019, following Timothy Gallaudet and Benjamin Friedman.

In what came to be known as Sharpiegate, in September 2019, President Trump incorrectly stated that the path of Hurricane Dorian would include Alabama. Rather than correct his mistake, he went on to frequently and falsely claim he was correct. On September 4, he held a news conference in which he held up a map which showed the expected path of the hurricane with a black sharpie extension that included Alabama. On September 6, under Jacob's leadership, NOAA released a statement that backed Trump's false claim. An investigation of the incident found that Jacob had twice violated codes of the agency's scientific integrity policy.

=== Secretary of State ===
In March 2018, President Trump nominated Mike Pompeo as his new Secretary of State, succeeding Rex Tillerson. Pompeo has referred to the Obama administration's environment and climate change plans as "damaging" and "radical". He opposes the regulation of greenhouse gas emissions, and supports eliminating the United States federal register of greenhouse gas emissions. He has stated, "Federal policy should be about the American family, not worshipping a radical environmental agenda." In 2012 he called for the permanent elimination of wind power production tax credits calling them an "enormous government handout". In 2015 he voted against the Obama Administration's Clean Power Plan resolution. In 2019 Pompeo refused to sign on to a joint statement addressing the need for protection of the Arctic region from the threat of rapidly melting ice unless all mentions of climate change were removed from the document. He stated "climate change is actually good for the Arctic, since melting ice caps are 'opening up new shipping routes' and thus making it more economically viable to expand oil drilling in the region."

=== Assistant Attorney General for the Environment and Natural Resources Division ===
In 2018, Trump appointed Jeffrey Clark as the nation's top environmental lawyer. Clark previously represented numerous oil industry clients and represented BP in lawsuits over the 2010 oil spill. He has also represented the Chamber of Commerce in lawsuits challenging the government's authority to regulate carbon emissions and has argued that it is not appropriate to base government policymaking on the scientific consensus presented by the Intergovernmental Panel on Climate Change (IPCC).

In 2021, Clark was involved in the attempts to overturn the 2020 United States presidential election. In an attempt to pressure Georgia election officials to reverse its election results, Trump floated a plan to replace the acting Attorney General Jeffrey Rosen with Clark who would then reverse the decisions of the previous Attorney General, open an investigation, and pressure Georgia election officials to void Joe Biden's win in that state.

== Domestic energy policy ==
=== Deregulation ===
Trump unveiled what he called the "America First Energy Plan" soon after his inauguration. His administration claimed that American business "has been held back by burdensome regulations on [its] energy industry". The "America First" plan emphasized fossil fuels and did not mention renewable energy.

His main focus was on environmental rules imposed or proposed during the Obama administration. He portrayed himself as a champion of the environment, fighting for clean air and water while his critics said that his policies showed the opposite of what he claimed.

The Trump administration estimated deregulation would increase wages by over $30 billion by 2024. This figure specifically refers to the removal of Obama's Climate Action Plan and was drawn from a study from the Institute for Energy Research, a conservative non-profit organization specializing in research of global energy markets; the report actually based that figure on increased oil drilling on federal land and offshore, not on reduction of regulations.

When Trump took office the EPA focused on a range of topics including air, emergency management, land and cleanup, pesticides, toxic substances, waste, and water. Trump said he would refocus its efforts to solely protect clean air and clean water. This resulted in a 31% proposed budget cut to the EPA. Environmentalists, current EPA staff members, and former EPA staff members believed that the EPA would have a harder time upholding environmental standards with a smaller budget.

In a 2018 analysis, David Cutler and Francesca Dominici of Harvard University stated that under the most conservative estimate, the Trump administration's rollbacks and proposed reversals of environmental rules would likely "cost the lives of over 80 000 US residents per decade and lead to respiratory problems for many more than 1 million people." The EPA responded to the analysis by stating "This is not a scientific article, it's a political article."

==== Water use reduction programs ====
In 2006 the EPA launched the WaterSense program to reduce water use of fixtures such as toilets. In December 2019, after meeting with small business owners Trump announced he had ordered a federal review of water efficiency standards pertaining to bathroom fixtures. He said it was "common sense" to review standards which resulted in showers with water "quietly dripping out", toilets that end up using more water because "people are flushing toilets 10 times, 15 times as opposed to once" and sink water faucets with such a diminished flow that it takes twice as long to wash one's hands. At their website the EPA states that "recent advancements have allowed toilets to use 1.28 gallons per flush or less while still providing equal or superior performance." In December 2019, Trump said "women tell me" they have to run modern dishwashers more than once to get clean dishes.

==== Renewable energy policy ====
In 2016 it was reported that America currently had 264 billion barrels of oil reserves, the largest oil reserve of any nation. The United States also has a vast amount of coal reserves, amounting to 26% of the world's total, more than any other nation. Its untapped oil and coal resources are estimated to be worth about $50 trillion according to the Trump administration. However, reports from the Natural Resources Defense Council (NRDC) show that coal consumption in the US has steadily declined by about 20% over the last 10 years, with natural gas and renewable energy quickly taking over. Christina Simeone, director of policy and external affairs with the Kleinman Center for Energy Policy at the University of Pennsylvania, says that strict regulations aren't the only reason for the faltering coal market; natural gas has now become a cheaper option.

Trump wants America to achieve energy independence from OPEC and all nations hostile to the interests of the United States to ensure national security, and insulate it from any supply disruptions and price fluctuations from the global oil market. However, fossil fuels are finite, and entities such as the Pentagon claim climate change also poses a threat to national security. The NRDC has argued that a more reliable long-term solution would be to develop more of a reliance on renewable energy rather than maintaining a reliance on fossil fuels.

The America First Energy Plan does not mention renewable energy and instead reflects the president's focus on fossil fuels. During the campaign, Trump praised solar technology during a rally in California the summer of 2016 but then criticized it for being too expensive and has since complained about the subsidies renewable energy companies receive. The Trump administration's 2019 budget proposes large cuts in programs that research renewable energy and that study the effects of and ways to mitigate climate change.

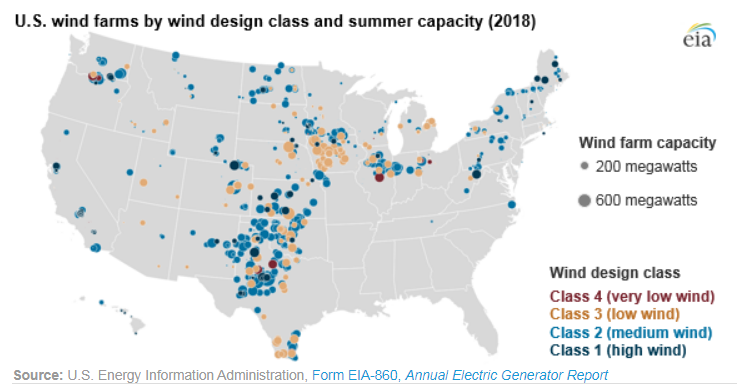
2018 US wind farms

Wind power is one of the fastest job-growing industries in the country and it is producing a substantial amount of power in some areas; for example, 25% of the energy in Iowa and North and South Dakota is from the wind. Minnesota, which ranks 7th in the nation at 18%, plans to shut down all of its coal-fired plants by 2030 and switch to renewable energy for all of its power needs.

Trump has repeatedly claimed, without evidence, that noise from windmills causes cancer. He has also repeatedly said that they cause avian deaths, which is true. The US Fish and Wildlife Service reports that up to 300,000 birds a year are killed by windmills; however, they say that that number is low compared to other sources.

In August 2019, Trump falsely claimed: "if a windmill is within two miles of your house, your house is practically worthless"; this claim is not supported by studies in the United States.

==== COVID-19 pandemic relaxation of regulations ====
In response to oil industry lobbyists, the Trump administration suspended the enforcement of certain environmental laws during the ongoing COVID-19 pandemic. In March 2020, it was announced that the EPA would not expect routine monitoring and compliance or reporting of pollution emissions and would not pursue penalties for breaking those rules as long as it could be claimed that the violations were caused by the pandemic. Because COVID-19 attacks the lungs, environmental groups expressed particular concern over air pollution emitted from industrial facilities, which are predominantly located in communities with large numbers of people of color and low-income people.

At the urging of The Heritage Foundation, a conservative think tank, the pandemic was also used as a reason to increase the sale of public land to industry to open them to mining, drilling for gas and oil, and cutting timber. Cynthia Giles, head of EPA enforcement during the Obama administration, commented, "I am not aware of any instance when EPA ever relinquished this fundamental authority as it does in this memo. This memo amounts to a nationwide moratorium on enforcing the nation's environmental laws and is an abdication of EPA's responsibility to protect the public."

=== Keystone XL and Dakota Access pipeline ===
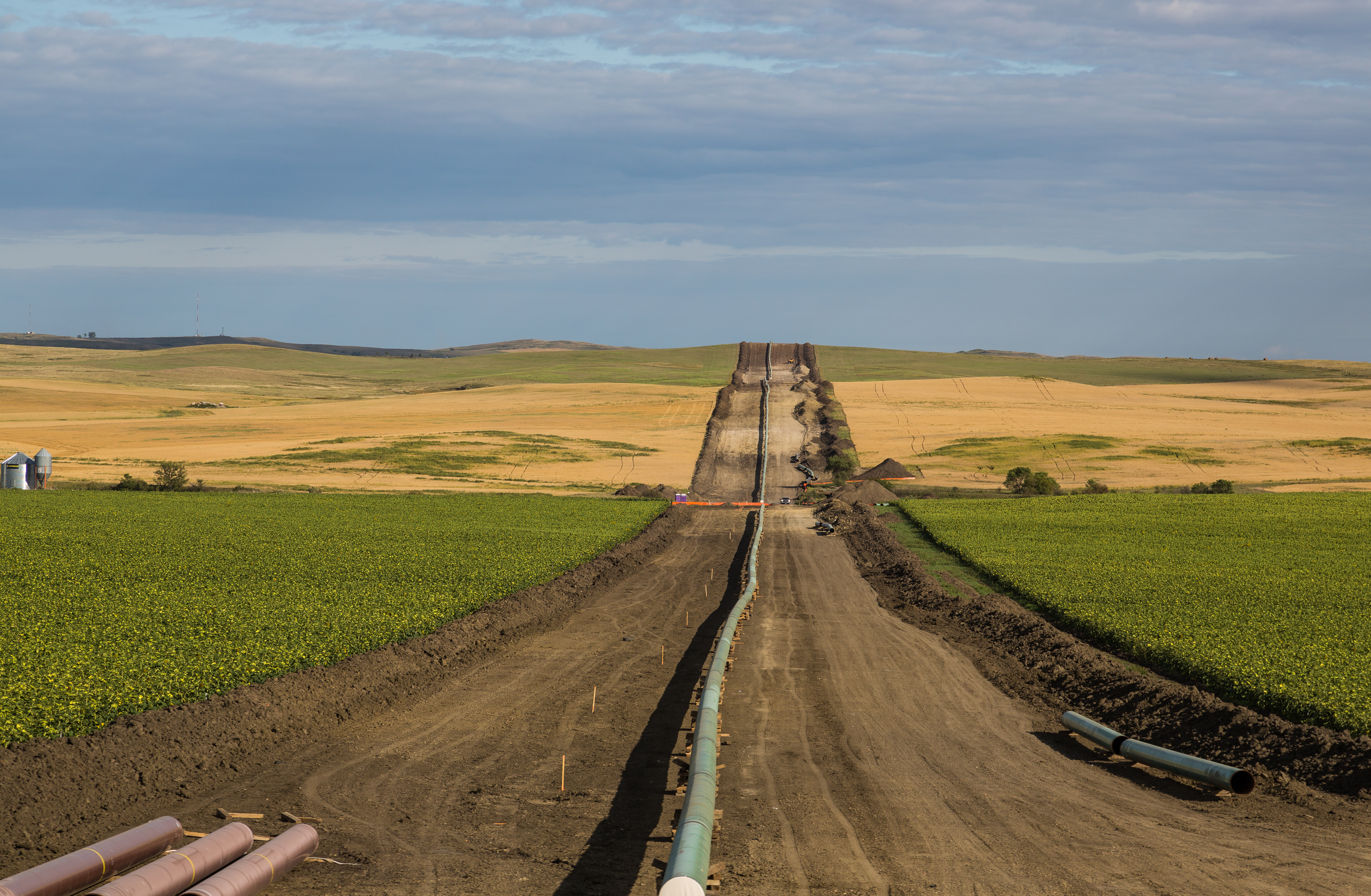
Construction of the Dakota Access Pipeline (shown above) resumed under the Trump administration.

The construction of the Keystone XL and Dakota Access had been placed on hold by then-president Barack Obama, who considered it a major contributor to climate change due to the greenhouse gas intensive extraction of oil from tar sands. After months of protest, in December 2016 the United States Army Corps of Engineers (USACE) under the Obama administration announced that it would not grant an easement for the pipeline to be drilled under Lake Oahe and that USACE was undertaking an environmental impact statement to look at possible alternative routes.

Many Sioux tribes said that the pipeline threatens the tribe's environmental and economic well-being, and that it has damaged and destroyed sites of great historic, religious, and cultural significance. The tribe has expressed concern about leaks because the pipeline passes under Lake Oahe, which serves as a major source of water. Protests at pipeline construction sites in North Dakota began in the spring of 2016 and drew indigenous people from throughout North America as well as many other supporters, creating the largest gathering of Native Americans in the past hundred years.

An executive order reviving the plans for the pipelines was signed by Trump on January 24, 2017, with the hopes of creating jobs and bolstering domestic energy production. The pipeline became commercially operational on June 1, 2017 In September 2018, the Dakota Access pipeline was estimated to have created 51 permanent jobs across the four states that it passes through.

The Standing Rock Sioux Tribe sued and in March 2020 a federal judge sided with the tribe and ordered USACE to do a full environmental impact statement. The Judge found the existing impact statement extremely lacking, noting numerous factors that had not been taken into account or were clearly not accurate. In July 2020, saying federal officials failed to carry out a complete analysis of its environmental impacts, U.S. District Judge James Boasberg ruled that the pipeline must be shut down by August 5. Pipeline owner Energy Transfer appealed and on August 5, the Court of Appeals sided with Energy Transfer to allow the pipeline to stay open. However the court did not grant Energy Transfer's motion to block the review, which must continue.

=== Executive order on climate change ===
Amid protests, on March 28, 2017, Trump signed a "sweeping executive order" instructing EPA "regulators to rewrite key rules curbing U.S. carbon emissions and other environmental regulations." Trump was accompanied by "coal miners and coal executives" among others and he devoted his remarks on the executive order to "praising coal miners, pipelines and U.S. manufacturing." He addressed the coal-miners directly, "Come on, fellas. Basically, you know what this is? You know what it says, right? You're going back to work." A Trump official said that the executive order plans to put American jobs first by not supporting climate change policies that place the economy at risk.

=== Auto fuel economy and emissions standards ===
More than 20 percent of greenhouse gas emissions in the U.S. come from light-duty trucks and cars. The Obama administration 2012 fuel economy plan called for a doubling in fuel economy for new cars and light trucks, to more than 50 miles per US gallon (4.7 L/100 km; 60 mpg_{‑imp}) by 2025, equivalent to a real-world average of 36 miles per US gallon (6.5 L/100 km; 43 mpg_{‑imp}). In April 2018, saying "those standards are inappropriate and should be revised," Scott Pruitt announced that the EPA was rolling back the Obama administration's fuel efficiency and emissions standards. Democratic Senate Minority Leader Chuck Schumer expressed his concern.

The state of California has a waiver that allows it to set its own auto emissions standards, which it has used to combat smog and, more recently, global warming. Thirteen other states and the District of Columbia have adopted the California standards as their own. Arguing that the Pruitt plan violates the federal Clean Air Act and doesn't follow the agency's own regulations, in April California sued the Trump administration. Joining California were Connecticut, Delaware, Illinois, Iowa, Maine, Maryland, Minnesota, New Jersey, New York, Oregon, Rhode Island, Vermont, Washington, Massachusetts, Pennsylvania, Virginia and the District of Columbia. All have Democratic attorneys general.

While automakers sought a relaxation of emission control requirements, they found the Trump rollback proposal extreme and were concerned it would split the American car market into two regulatory regimes. In July 2019, four automakers —Ford, Honda, Volkswagen Group of America and BMW of North America – rejected the Trump rule proposal and adopted the California emission standards. Shortly thereafter, the Department of Justice began an antitrust investigation of these four companies on the basis that working the deal together may have restricted consumer choice. By February 2020, the DOJ announced it had ended the investigation with no action.

In April 2018, the administration announced plans to undo the Obama administration's auto fuel efficiency and emissions standards. In September 2019, Trump announced he planned to roll back the California waiver. State attorney general Xavier Becerra said Trump had "no basis and no authority" to revoke the waiver. In a statement, Governor Gavin Newsom said, "It's a move that could have devastating consequences for our kids' health and the air we breathe if California were to roll over. We will fight this latest attempt and defend our clean car standards." What followed was California and many other states suing the Trump administration.

On March 31, 2020, the administration released its final rule on mileage standards through 2026. In a statement EPA head Andrew Wheeler said, "We are delivering on President Trump's promise to correct the current fuel economy and greenhouse gas emissions standards." The administration says the less stringent mileage standards will allow consumers to continue to buy the less fuel-efficient SUVs that U.S. drivers have favored for years. It is expected that states and environmental groups will challenge the Trump rules, and a U.S. District Court will likely issue a temporary order shelving them until it decides whether they are legal.

In December 2020, following Joseph Biden's successful bid for the presidency General Motors CEO Mary Barra announced that GM would drop its participation in the Trump administration lawsuit seeking to block California's right to set its own clean air standards. Commenting, she said that "the ambitious electrification goals of the president-elect, California, and General Motors are aligned, to address climate change by drastically reducing automobile emissions."

=== Nuclear ===
in 2017, Trump announced that his administration would "begin to revive and expand our nuclear energy sector, which I'm so happy about, which produces clean, renewable and emissions-free energy." In line with this, he signed the Nuclear Energy Innovation Capabilities Act of 2017.

=== Rollback of efficient lighting regulations ===
In September 2019, the Energy Department announced the reversal of a 2014 regulation that would have taken effect on January 1, 2020, and implemented the last round of energy-saving light bulb regulations outlined by the Energy Independence and Security Act of 2007. A spokesperson for the Alliance to Save Energy disputed the Department's regulations, saying that an average American household's lighting cost would increase by about $100 a year. The spokesperson also said that using less efficient light bulbs would require the electricity produced by 25 coal power plants. The ruling would allow some types of incandescent bulbs to remain in service. The U.S. states of California, Colorado, Nevada, Washington, and Vermont adopted their own energy standards. The California law was challenged in court by light bulb manufacturers but a judge ruled it was proper under the congressional exemption previously granted.

== Proposed EPA budget cuts ==
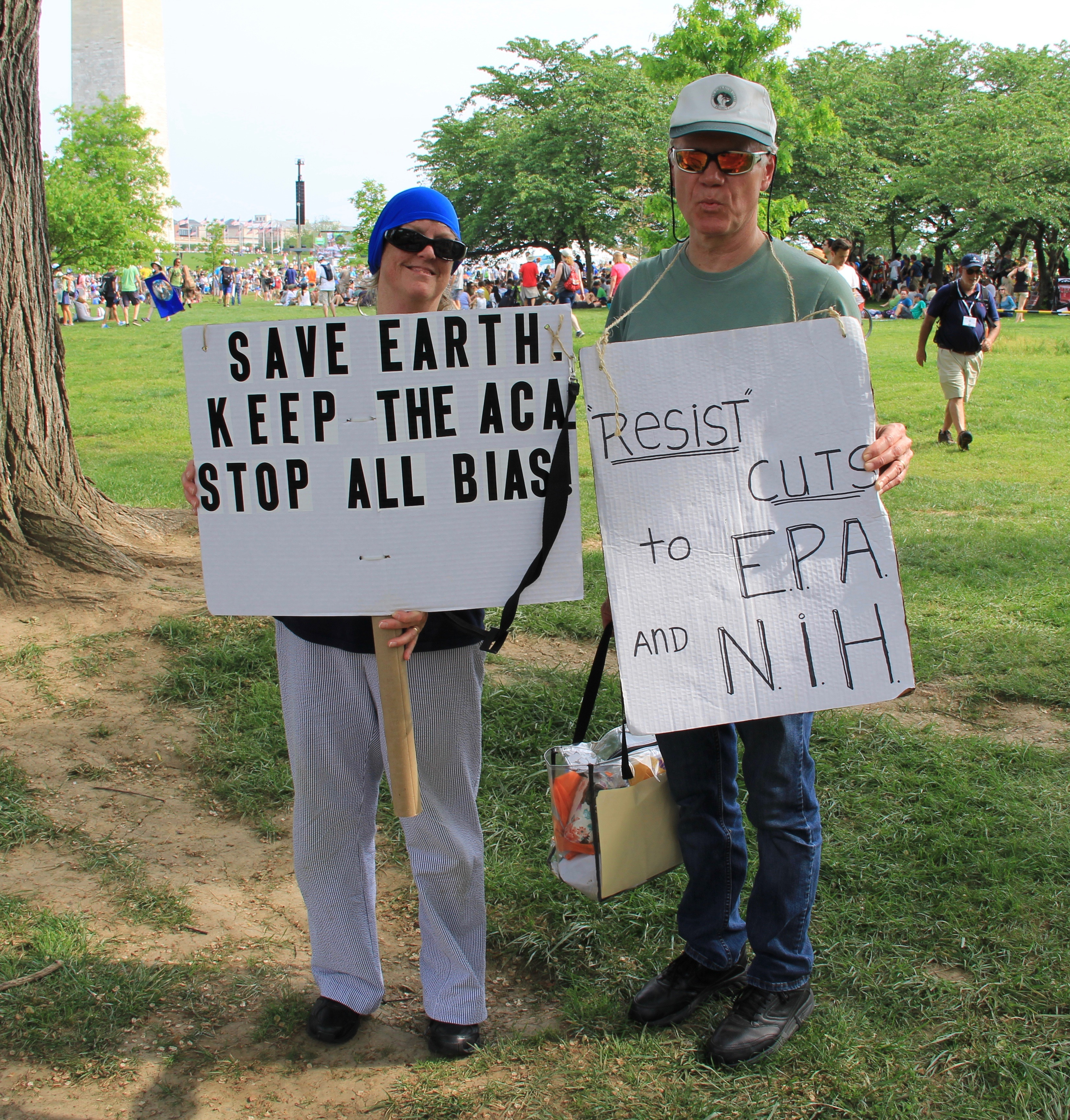
People's Climate March in Washington DC – 2017

While campaigning for office Trump had proposed the idea of eliminating the Environmental Protection Agency to help balance the United States' budget. Trump said, "We're going to have little tidbits left but we're going to get most of it out". Following his election, in March 2017, he announced plans to cut the EPA 2018 budget by 31%, by far the largest budget cut to any federal agency. The cut would result in a loss of 19% of the workforce or roughly 3,200 employees, through both staff buyouts and layoffs. The choice to remove the Clean Power Plan, which was put in place to reduce carbon dioxide emissions chiefly from coal-fired Power Plants, would effectively eliminate Obama's efforts to curb climate change. This plan would also remove the $100 million allocated to fund research combating climate change. The National Oceanic and Atmospheric Administration provides $250 million for programs which aid countries with high risk of impacts from rising and increasingly warm and acidic sea water levels. These programs would be eliminated under the new set of budget cuts. If enacted, this would mean the elimination of up to 38 of the agency's programs. Programs to be eliminated included the radon program, grants to clean up industrial sites ("brownfields"), climate change research, and the Office of Environmental Justice.

Trump's objectives include the lifting of regulations from various energy industries to boost domestic energy production. Trump asked American manufacturers which regulations made production the most difficult. The industry leaders responded, and an overwhelming number of them recommended lifting restrictions related to the environment and workers' rights. In an open letter to Scott Pruitt, Mustafa Ali, former head of the EPA's Environmental Justice Program who resigned in protest to Pruitt's budget cuts, expressed concerns with how the budget cuts will effect pollution in poor and minority neighborhoods.

The administration said it planned to refocus the EPA mission on clean water, air, and other core responsibilities. It also planned to delegate more of the EPA's enforcement activities to the states, while decreasing the amount of money given to states for that purpose by 30%. Issues like greenhouse gas emissions would be trimmed significantly or eliminated from the budget.

On September 12, 2018, the Senate approved a so-called Minibus funding bill or Omnibus spending bill, which reduced the EPA's budget from $8.2 billion annually to $5.7 billion, a decrease of $2.5 billion or −31%. The bill was expected to eliminate more than 50 programs and 3,200 jobs, discontinue funding for international climate-change programs, cut funding for the Office of Research and development in half, cut funding for the Superfund cleanup program and the Office of Enforcement and Compliance, and prioritizes drinking water and wastewater infrastructure projects.

== Department of the Interior ==
The Department of the Interior is responsible for the management and conservation of natural resources, most federal lands such as national parks and forests, wildlife refuges and tribal territories. Trump accused President Obama of "denying millions of Americans access to the energy wealth sitting under our feet" by his leasing restrictions and the banning new coal extraction on federal lands. Trump campaigned on a promise to "unleash America's $50 trillion in untapped shale, oil, and natural gas reserves, plus hundreds of years in clean coal reserves." Trump's proposed 2018 budget aimed to cut $1.5 billion (~$1.84 billion in 2024) of funding from the Department of Interior.

In a White House speech in 2019, Trump hailed "America's environmental leadership" under his watch, asserting his administration was "being good stewards of our public land," reducing carbon emissions and promoting the "cleanest air" and "crystal clean" water. Experts noted that the cited achievements were the result of actions taken by his predecessors going all the way back to the Nixon administration.

The Trump administration stated plans to open up more federal land for energy development, such as fracking and drilling. The Clean Water Rule, issued by the EPA and the Army Corps of Engineers in 2015, was also a target for possible repeal. The rule clarifies the federal government's jurisdiction to protect small streams and wetlands from pollution. Developers, business, and agriculture groups oppose the rule because they believe that their private property rights are violated and that undue regulatory burdens are created. In January 2018, the EPA formally suspended the 2015 regulation and announced plans to issue a new version later in 2018. Fifteen states, two cities and several environmental organizations have challenged EPA's suspension in several lawsuits. On September 12, 2019, the Trump administration repealed the Clean Water Rule.

=== Tongass National Forest ===
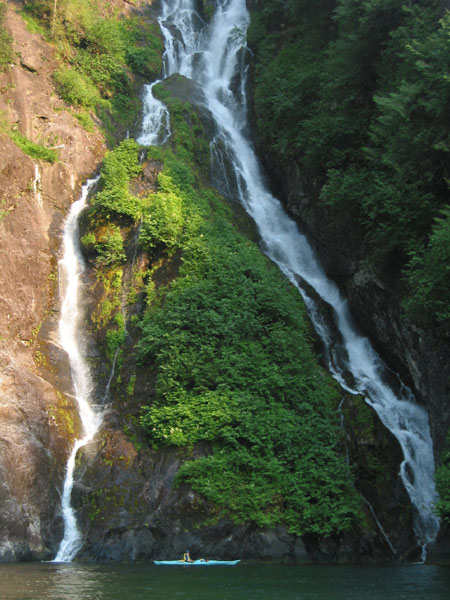
Misty Fjords Waterfall

In August 2019, Trump had instructed Agriculture Secretary Sonny Perdue to exempt Alaska's Tongass National Forest from logging restrictions established nearly 20 years ago during the Clinton administration. The move opens it to potential logging and energy and mining projects. Tongass is the world's largest intact temperate rainforest. It serves as an enormous natural carbon sink, holding an estimated 8% of all carbon stored in U.S. national forests. The Forest Service had finalized a plan to phase out old-growth logging in 2016 and Congress had designated more than 5.7 million acres of the forest as wilderness, not to be developed under any circumstances. Should Trump's plan be successful, it could affect 9.5 million acres. On September 25, 2020, the Trump administration submitted a revised environmental impact study which recommended a "full exemption" for the Tongass, opening the forest to more development and logging. Responding, Andy Moderow of the Alaska Wilderness League said that Tongass plays an important role in helping to combat climate change noting that it "stores more than 400 million metric tons of CO2 and sequesters an additional 3 million metric tons annually, equivalent to taking nearly 650,000 cars off the road each year."

In November 2021, the Biden administration announced they would start to reinstate the Roadless Rule, protecting about 9 million acres of Tongass National Forest. In a statement Agriculture Secretary Tom Vilsack said, "Restoring the Tongas' roadless protections supports the advancement of economic, ecologic and cultural sustainability in Southeast Alaska in a manner that is guided by local voices".

=== Proposed Alaska gold and copper mine ===
In July 2020, Trump reversed the Obama administration's decision against a proposed Alaska gold and copper mining operation, Pebble Mine in Bristol Bay. The Obama administration had found that a mine would permanently harm the region's sockeye salmon fisheries. The Trump administration's reversal was, according to The Washington Post, typical of the administration's "whiplash" decisions which have "methodically dismantled many of his predecessor's actions on climate change, conservation and pollution." The Army Corps of Engineers denied the Pebble Mine permit on November 25, 2020. The proposal had been opposed by 80 percent of Bristol Bay residents.

=== Boundary Waters Canoe Area Wilderness ===
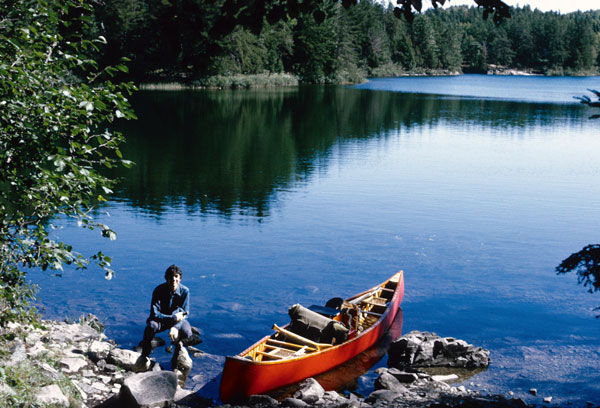
Boundary Waters Canoe Area Wilderness

The Boundary Waters Canoe Area Wilderness is a 1,090,000-acre (4,400 km^{2}) wilderness area in the state of Minnesota. In 2018, the Trump administration cleared the way for renewed mineral leasing within the watershed of the BWCA. The Obama administration had proposed a 20-year mining ban and asked for an environmental study based on concerns that mining in the Boundary Waters watershed could lead to irreversible harm to the BWCA. Environmentalists challenged the reversal of the decisions in federal court. In January 2022, the Biden administration cancelled the mining leases granted by Trump saying that the department's Office of Solicitor ruled that they had been improperly renewed.

=== Hunting ===
The International Wildlife Conservation Council (IWCC) was created under the Department of the Interior to loosen restrictions around importing endangered wildlife hunting trophies like heads and skins. After a judge ruled in February 2020 that the council's legitimacy could be challenged in court, the Department of the Interior told the judge that the council's charter had already ended and would not be renewed.

In June 2020, the administration changed a five-year-old Obama-era rule to allow, once again, hunters on federal land in Alaska to use food to lure bears out of hibernation; to use artificial light to enter wolf dens; and to shoot animals from planes, boats, and snowmobiles.

=== National monuments ===
In April 2017, President Trump directed the Department of the Interior to review 27 monuments of at least 100,000 acres (40,000 ha) in size through Executive Order 13792. The vast majority of the lands under review were set aside by President Obama.

In June 2017, Zinke issued an interim report as requested in the executive order. He proposed a scaling back of the Bears Ears National Monument. In August 2017, Zinke delivered a final report which called for the reduction of Bears Ears (established by Obama – 2016), Cascade–Siskiyou (Clinton – 2000), Gold Butte (Obama – 2016), Grand Staircase–Escalante (Clinton – 1996), Pacific Remote Islands Marine (Bush – 2006), and Rose Atoll Marine (Bush – 2009).

==== Bears Ears Monument ====
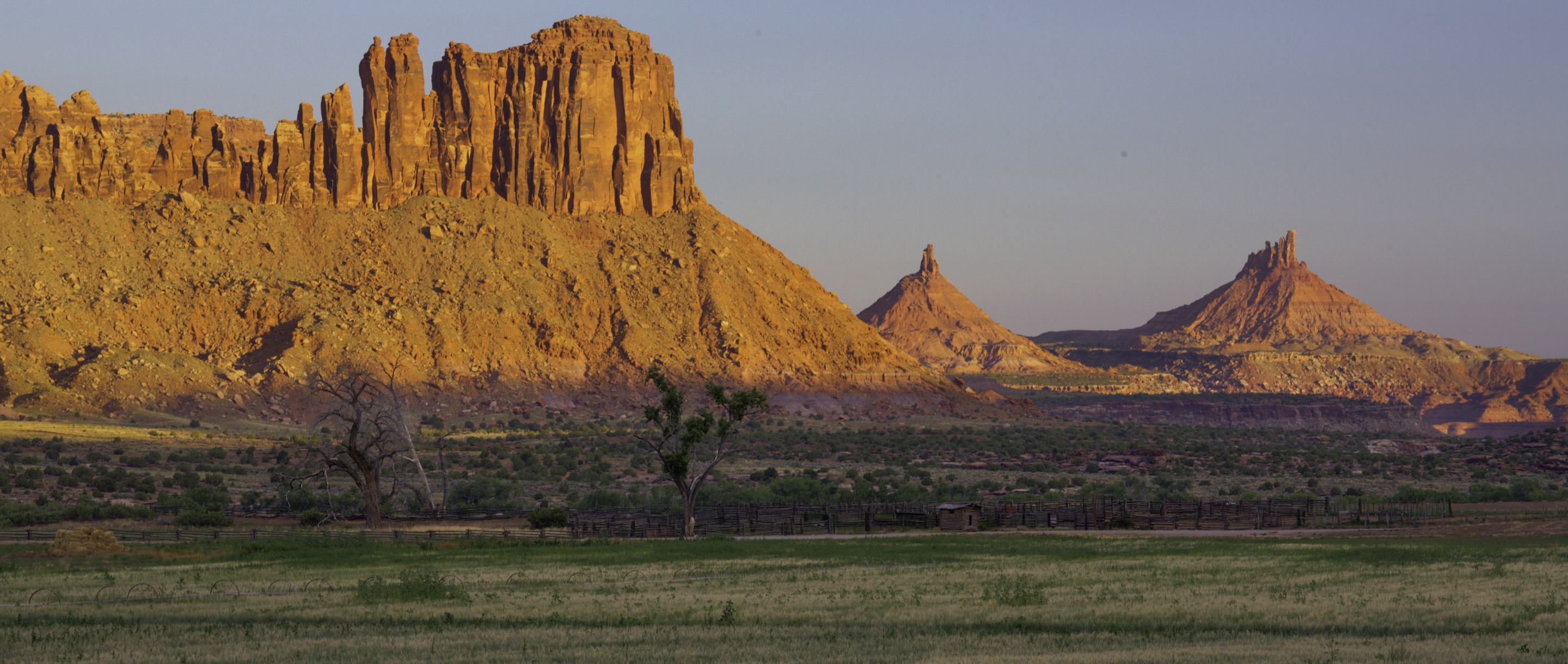
Bridger Jack Butte (left) with the Sixshooter Peaks in the background. The names are listed in the presidential proclamation as "Hoon'Naqvut, Shash Jáa, Kwiyagatu Nukavachi, Ansh An Lashokdiwe", all four mean "Bears Ears".

Bears Ears National Monument, located in southeastern Utah, was established by presidential proclamation by Barack Obama in 2016. Five native American tribes urged Obama to create the monument to preserve about 9,000 recorded archaeological sites, including petroglyphs, woven cloth, human remains and ancient roads. In 2017 Donald Trump reduced it by 85%. Members of the Navajo tribe in particular were integral to the monument's passage. A tribal spokesperson stated that a reduction in the size of the Bear's Ears Monument would be "an attack on a significant part of the foundation of American conservation law." A different opinion was offered by Republican Utah state representative Mike Noel who sees a shrinking of the Bears Ears Monument as a victory over federal restrictions over mining and animal grazing. "When you turn the management over to the tree-huggers, the bird and bunny lovers and the rock lickers, you turn your heritage over."

Legal scholars have argued that the reduction is not authorized by law and several federal lawsuits have been filed challenging Trump's action. They contend that the Trump administration stacked the Federal Advisory Committee Act committee, which is supposed to be balanced and not unduly influenced by the financial interests of its members, with politicians and ranchers with a conflict of interest. An attorney who works with Democracy Forward commented, "The Bears Ears committee was designed to protect a treasure of the American West and stacking it with opponents of the monument could violate federal law." (See update above)

==== Northeast Canyons and Seamounts Marine National Monument ====
On June 5, 2020, President Trump signed a proclamation that opened the Northeast Canyons and Seamounts Marine National Monument, the Atlantic Ocean's only fully protected marine sanctuary, to commercial fishing. In 2016 the Obama administration created the monument, an area of nearly 5,000 square miles, to protect whales and other endangered species and to allow marine life to recover from overfishing. Soon after Trump took office he ordered his administration to review marine sanctuaries and Ryan Zinke, Interior Department Secretary at that time, met with fishermen and fishing industry groups that were attempting to overturn the Obama legislation. During a roundtable discussion held in Maine in June 2020, Trump met with Maine's former governor Paul LePage, a Trump supporter, and commercial fishermen and signed an executive order to end the restrictions on commercial fishing. The current governor, Janet Mills, was not invited to the event. Responding to Trump's ruling a senior attorney for the Center for Biological Diversity, an organization that works to protect endangered species, said, "Gutting these safeguards attacks the very idea of marine monuments." (See update above)

=== Offshore drilling ===
In January 2018, the Interior Department announced plans to allow drilling in nearly all U.S. waters. This would be the largest expansion of offshore oil and gas leasing ever proposed, and includes regions that were long off-limits to development and more than 100 million acres in the Arctic and the Eastern Seaboard, regions that President Obama had placed under a drilling moratorium.

=== Opening the Arctic National Wildlife Refuge and North Slope to drilling ===
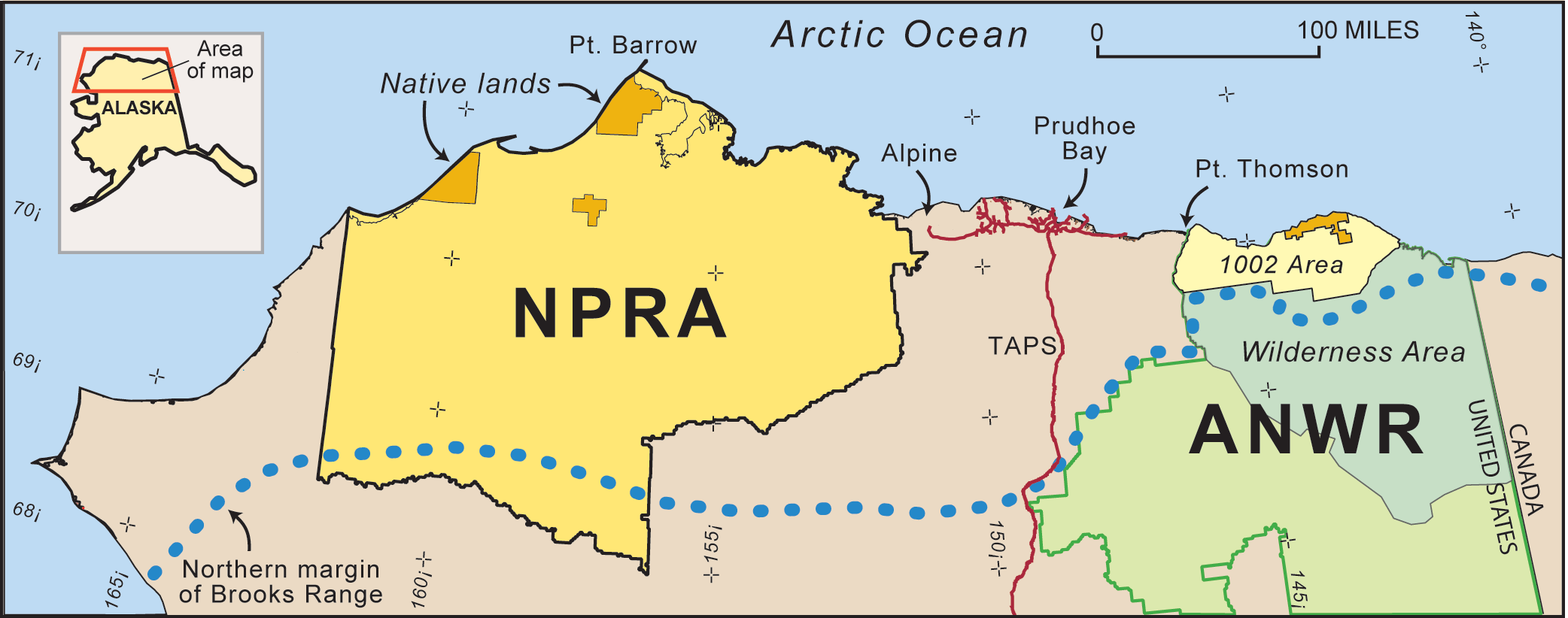
A map of northern Alaska; the dotted line shows the southern boundary of the North Slope. Alaska is to the west, the Arctic National Wildlife Refuge to the east, and Prudhoe Bay is between them.

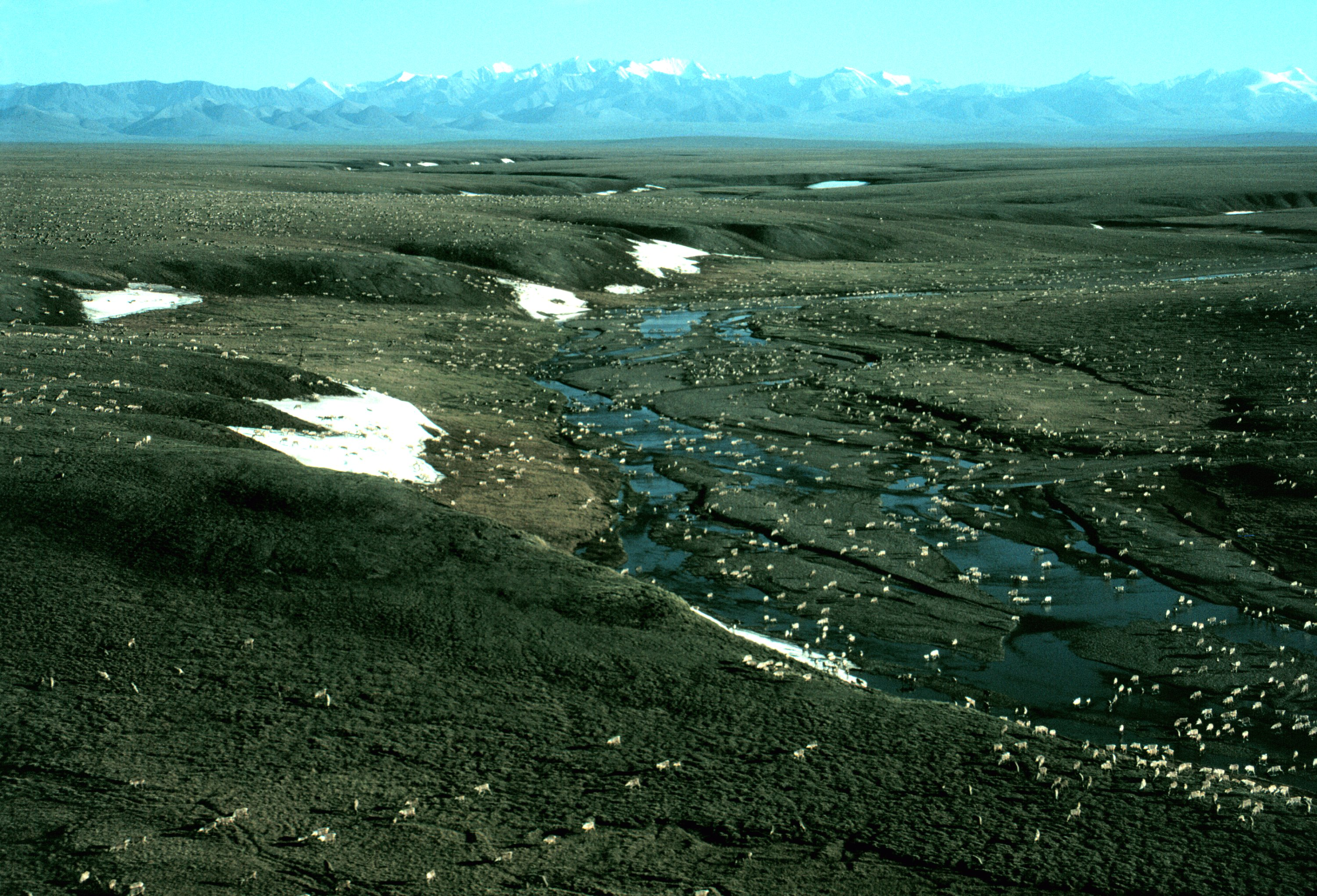
Caribou herd at the Arctic National Wildlife Refuge

The Trump administration tax bill passed in December 2017, including a provision introduced by Alaska senator Lisa Murkowski that required Interior Secretary Ryan Zinke to approve at least two lease sales for drilling in Alaska's Arctic National Wildlife Refuge (ANWR). Scientists, environmentalists and former Interior Department officials have warned that fossil fuel extraction in the ANWR could harm the landscape and the species that live there.

In September 2019, the administration said they would like to see the entire coastal plain opened for gas and oil exploration, the most aggressive of the suggested development options. The Interior Department's Bureau of Land Management (BLM) has filed a final environmental impact statement and plans to start granting leases by the end of the year. The area includes areas where caribou visit for calving and polar bears who have been driven to spend more of their time along the refuge's coastal plain due to melting ice caused by global warming have their dens. There are concerns for the Indigenous populations as well because many of them rely on subsistence hunting and fishing. In a review of the statement the U.S. Fish and Wildlife Service said the BLM's final statement underestimated the climate impacts of the oil leases because they viewed global warming as cyclical rather than human-made. The administration's plan calls for "the construction of as many as four places for airstrips and well pads, 175 miles of roads, vertical supports for pipelines, a seawater-treatment plant and a barge landing and storage site."

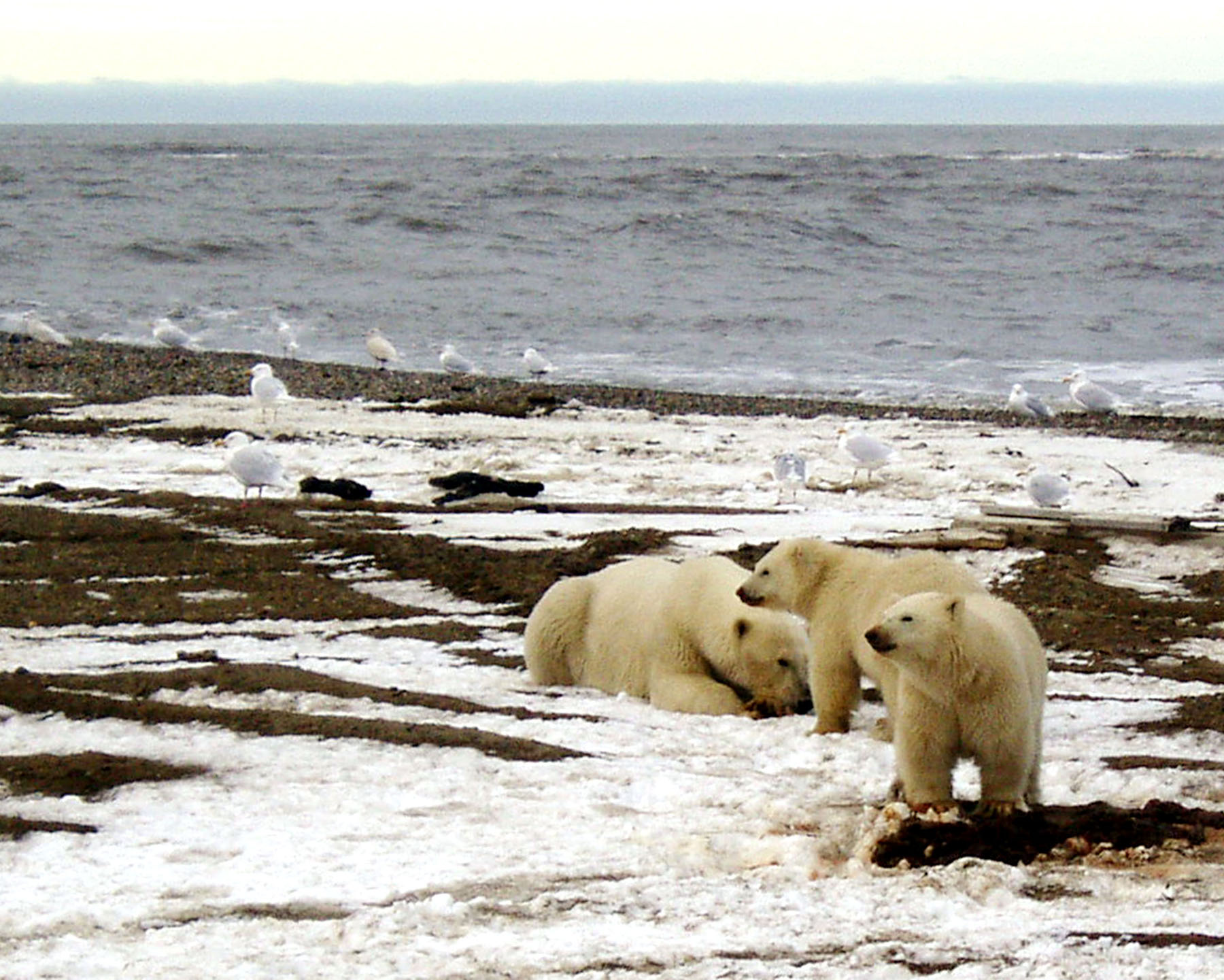
Polar bear sow and two cubs on the Beaufort Sea coast, Arctic National Wildlife Refuge

On August 17, 2020, the Trump Administration finalized and announced its decision to open the ANWR to drilling. Interior Secretary David Bernhardt, formerly an oil industry lobbyist, said that the administration's oil and gas leasing program could "create thousands of jobs" and "mark a new chapter in American energy independence." Trump's decision had been seen as a way to make the opening of the region to drilling harder to undo should a new administration be voted in during the November 2020 presidential election.

In January 2021 President Trump finalized legislation to allow drilling in 18.6 million acres in the Alaska North Slope along the Arctic Ocean. Tribal and environmental groups warned that expanding drilling will potentially imperil wildlife and Native Alaskans who count on caribou hunting for sustenance.

In June 2021,`the Biden Administration suspended all drilling in the Arctic National Wildlife Refuge and the North Slope.

=== Great American Outdoors Act and the LWCF ===
In August 2020, Trump signed the bipartisan Great American Outdoors Act, which gives billions of dollars to fix national park infrastructure. It also provides annual funding to the decades-old Land and Water Conservation Fund (LWCF). However, on November 9, 2020, Interior Secretary David Bernhardt signed an order allowing state and local leaders to veto land acquisitions made by the federal government under LWCF.

=== Privatization of Native American reservations ===
Within the Interior Department, the Bureau of Indian Affairs handles some federal relations with Native Americans. Native American reservations are estimated to contain about a fifth of the nation's oil and gas, along with vast coal reserves. In December 2016, a Trump advisory group put forth a plan to privatize Native American reservations to open them up to drilling and mining. Many Native Americans view such efforts as a violation of tribal self-determination and culture.

Trump's transition team commissioned a Native American coalition to draw up a list of proposals to guide his Indian policy. According to a Reuters investigative report, "The backgrounds of the coalition's leadership are one sign of its pro-drilling bent. At least three of four chair-level members have links to the oil industry."

=== Endangered species threats ===
In February 2018, Trump and Interior Secretary Ryan Zinke presented their recommendation for the 2019 budget. It did not grant any funding for state efforts for the recovery of endangered species. The Cooperative Endangered species Conservation Fund, a program authorized by the Endangered Species Act, supports conservation planning, habitat restoration, land acquisition, research, and education. The administration justified the budget change saying that it "is not requesting funding for these activities in order to support higher priorities."

A senior scientist with the Center for Biological Diversity said gutting the fund would push endangered species toward extinction. "This is especially damaging because [the] funding is often the backbone of state non-game programs and helps animals across the country, from bats and butterflies to salmon and grizzlies."

In July 2018, more than two dozen pieces of "legislation, policy initiatives and amendments designed to weaken" the Endangered Species Act were introduced or voted on by congress. Former oil lobbyist David Bernhardt, the deputy interior secretary, led the push to review the endangered species act. Utah Republican representative Rob Bishop, chairman of the House Natural Resources Committee, said. "We're all aware that the Endangered Species Act hasn't undergone any significant updates in over 40 years. Now is the time to modernize this antiquated law to simultaneously benefit both endangered species and the American people." Andrew Rosenberg, director of the Union of Concerned Scientists, commented, "I think the Endangered Species Act is endangered. They haven't been able to do this for 20 years, but this looks like their one chance."

In August 2019, the Department of Interior announced a list of major changes to the Endangered Species Act. Industry groups and Republican lawmakers applauded the proposed changes while critics expressed concerns as they are coming at a time of crisis when as many as one million plant and animal species are at risk of extinction. Numerous state attorneys general and environmental groups have said that they will sue the administration over the changes, alleging they are illegal because they're not grounded in scientific evidence.

One of Trump's final acts as president was to pardon Robert Bowker, a man who had pled guilty decades earlier to a violation the Lacey Act involving snakes and alligators.

==== Mexico border wall concerns ====
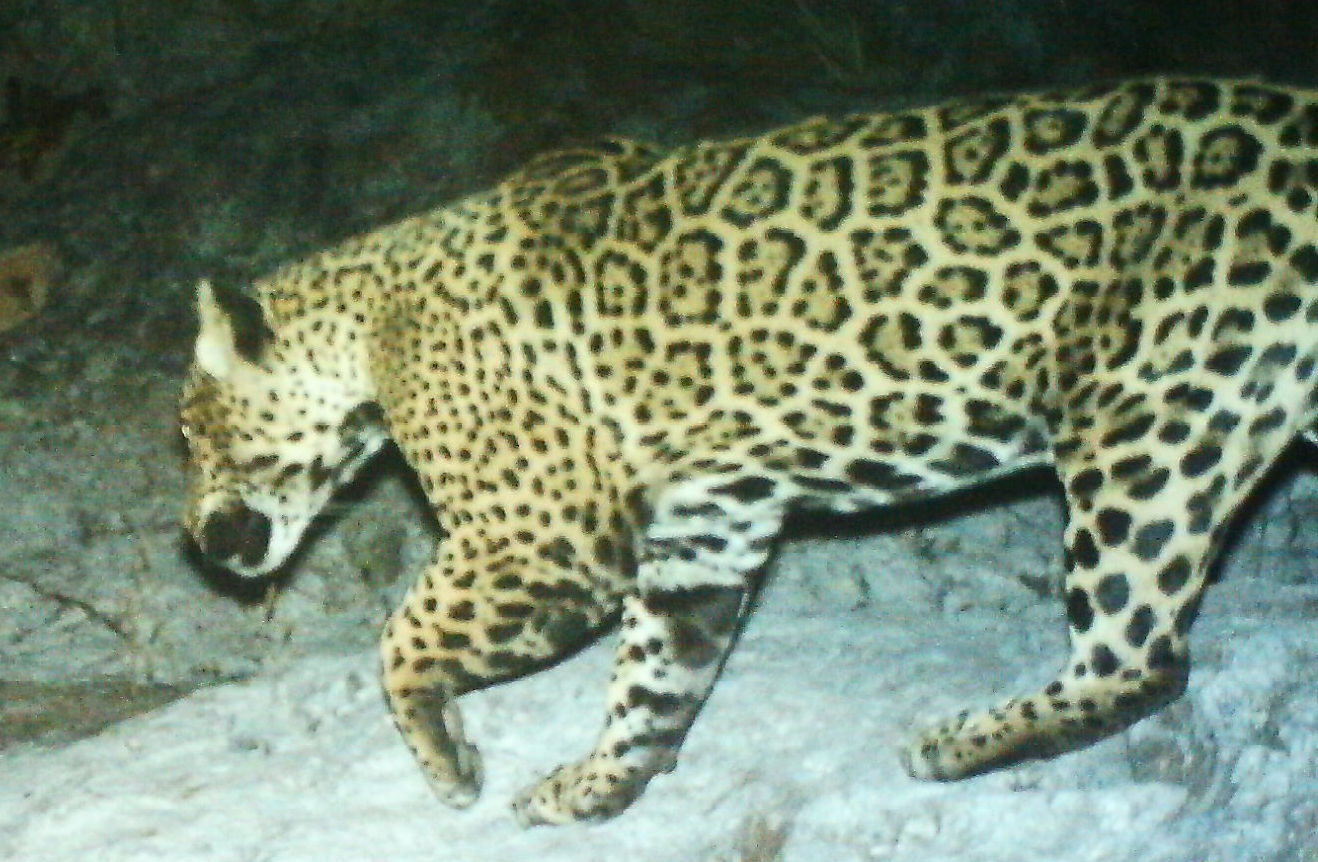
Male jaguar from the Santa Rita Mountains, Arizona, in 2015

President Donald Trump's signature campaign promise was the construction of a big wall on the southern border. The administration has described the project as including a 30 ft-tall concrete and steel "big, beautiful wall", a 150 ft 'enforcement zone' which will be kept clear of vegetation, and a road. Critical habitats are on the border with Mexico in California, Arizona, New Mexico and Texas. The Endangered Species Act of 1973 and candidates for that list from the United States Fish and Wildlife Service includes ninety-three species whose ranges are near or cross the border. Trump's proposed border wall will block the movement of threatened wildlife and interfere with the movement of animals in response to climate change and could prevent genetic exchange. Among the threatened species are the jaguar (the largest cat native to North America), the ocelot (30 lb [14 kg] cats that could be making a comeback), the Mexican wolf (the smallest Gray Wolf in North America), the Sonoran pronghorn (related to giraffes, they can run 60 mph [97 km/h] and are North America's fastest land mammals), the tiny cactus ferruginous pygmy owl (who fly at about 4.5 to 13 ft [1.4–4.0 m], lower than the wall), and the Quino checkerspot butterfly (who fly no higher than 6 to 8 ft [1.8–2.4 m]).

In July 2018, citing "bypassed environmental laws, habitat destruction, and losses to conservation and scientific research", in a report published in the scientific journal BioScience thousands of scientists "expressed alarm" over the expansion of the U.S.-Mexico border wall. The report has 16 co-authors and as of July 24, 2,700, signatures from almost 50 countries.

In December 2018, the U.S. Supreme Court issued a ruling which allowed the Trump administration to waive federal environmental protection laws to construct a border wall cutting through the National Butterfly Center in Mission, Texas. The center has been called the most diverse butterfly sanctuary in the country. Habitat restoration has also attracted birds which can not be seen anywhere else in the continental U.S. The wall will also slice through the Santa Ana National Wildlife Refuge and the Bentsen-Rio Grande Valley State Park.

==== Yellowstone grizzly ====
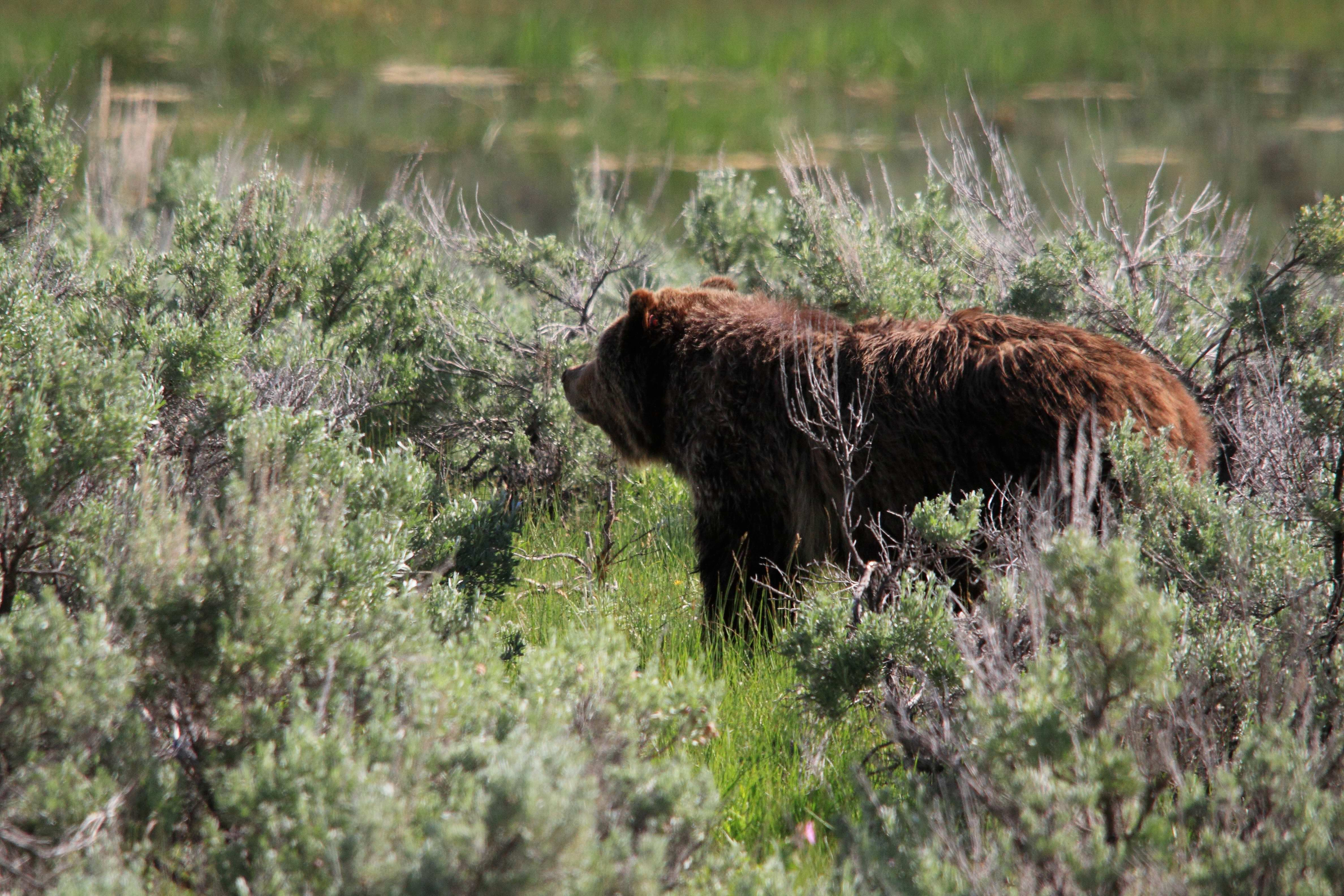
Yellowstone grizzly

Grizzly bears in the Lower 48 States were placed on the endangered list in 1975 because they had lost 98 percent of their historical range and the Yellowstone-area population had dropped to fewer than 140 bears. In June 2017, the Trump administration announced a decision to remove protections for Yellowstone grizzly bears under the Endangered Species Act. They argued that the population had sufficiently recovered from the threat of extinction, however numerous conservation and tribal organizations argued that the grizzly population remained genetically vulnerable. Numerous tribes revere the grizzly as sacred and they and environmentalists expressed fears about trophy hunts, livestock and logging interests, and the gas, coal, and oil extraction industries. They successfully sued the administration (Crow Tribe et al v. Zinke). On July 30, 2019, the Yellowstone grizzly was officially returned to federal protection. At a hearing on August 1, 2019, Congresswoman Liz Cheney, Republican from Wyoming which is one of the states affected by the ruling, stated that the successful litigation by the tribes and environmentalists "was not based on science or facts" but motivated by plaintiffs "intent on destroying our Western way of life."

==== Threats to migratory birds from industry ====
The Trump administration proposal to rollback protections that have been in place for more than a century was announced in June 2020. This would greatly limit federal authority to prosecute industries for practices that kill migratory birds. The new proposal would only punish oil and gas and construction companies if they intentionally kill birds. A study done by the U.S. Fish and Wildlife Service shows that "As the legal certainty increases, fewer entities would likely implement best practices ... resulting in increased bird mortality."

Noah Greenwald, endangered species director at the Center for Biological Diversity, called the analysis "a cynical effort" to justify a policy that is "clearly bad for birds, clearly cruel and inconsistent with the MBTA in every way." The courts ruled that the legal opinion which serves as the basis for this action does not align with the intent and language of the law in August 2010. The ruling stated that the policy "runs counter to the purpose of the MBTA to protect migratory bird populations" and is "contrary to the plain meaning of the MBTA".

==== Endangered gray wolves ====
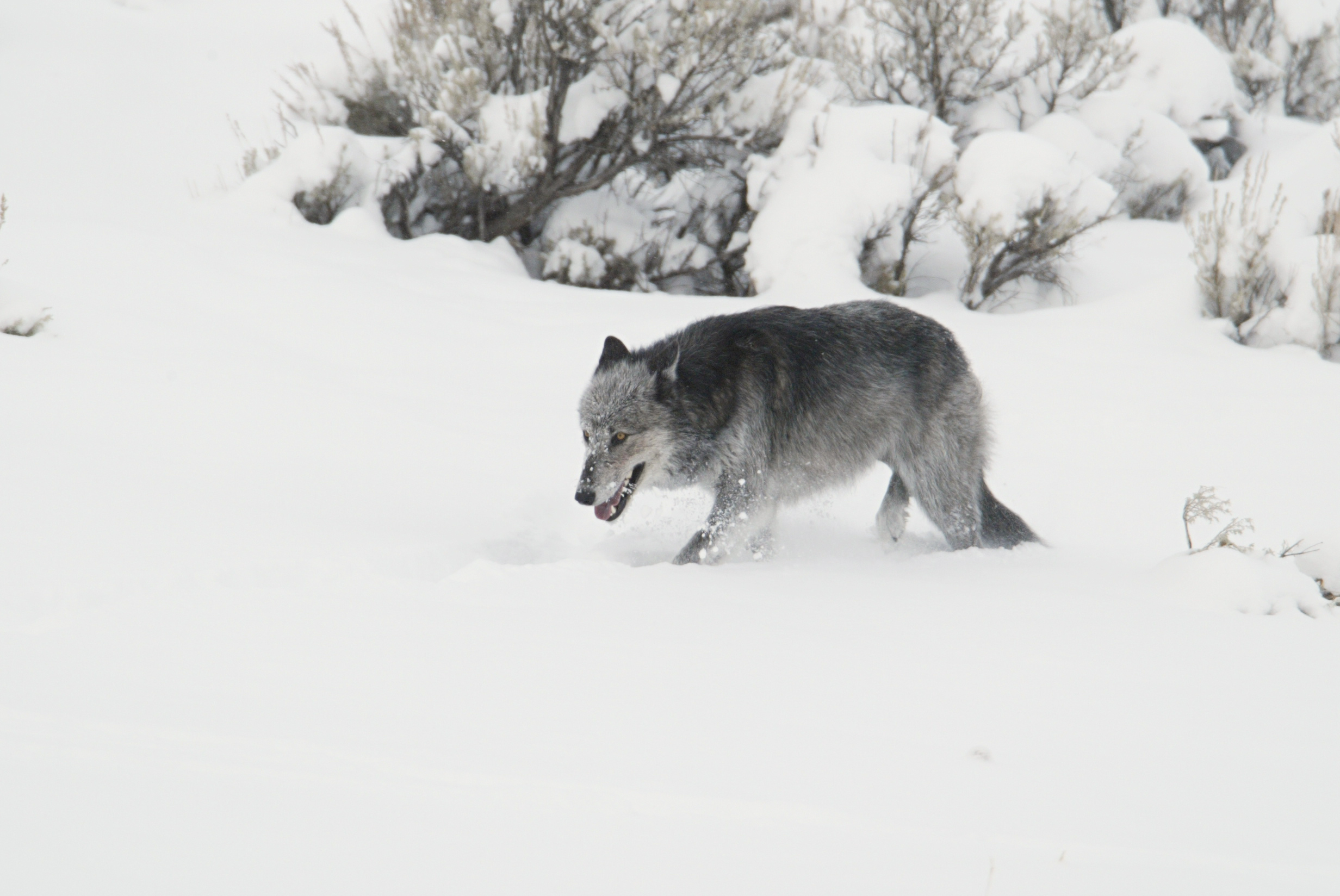
Grey wolf – photographed in Yellowstone National Park

In October 2020 the Trump administration announced that they had removed grey wolves from the endangered species list. Conservationists say that the population remains severely depleted in thousands of acres of historical wolf habitat areas in states such as Washington, California, and Oregon. They criticized the removal saying that the agency had not considered the impact that illegal hunting could have on the wolf population and concerns that in some isolated areas without connections to the larger populations they may be unable to survive.

In February 2022, a federal judge restored grey wolf protections in 45 states saying the US Fish and Wildlife Service "failed to adequately analyze and consider the impacts of partial delisting and of historical range loss on the already-listed species."

=== Regulation of hazardous chemicals ===
It has been charged that the Trump administration has attempted to change the way the federal government evaluates hazardous chemicals that may pose a risk to human health, making them more aligned with the chemical industry's wishes. Trump appointed Nancy B. Beck as a top deputy of the EPA's toxic chemical unit, while during her previous five years she had been an executive at the industry trade association American Chemistry Council for American chemical companies. Shortly after her appointment in May 2017, Beck rewrote, among others, the regulations covering the chemical, perfluorooctanoic acid, or PFOA, which has been linked to many serious health problems. Her revisions make it harder to track the health consequences of the chemical, and therefore harder to regulate.

==== Pesticides ====
In March 2017, EPA administrator Scott Pruitt denied that he had met with Dow Chemicals CEO Andrew Liveris before making a decision to deny a petition to ban Dow's chlorpyrifos pesticide that had been initiated by the Obama administration. Research has concluded that even minuscule amounts of chlorpyrifos can disrupt the development of fetuses and infants. In August, it was revealed that in fact Pruitt and other EPA officials had met with industry representatives on dozens of occasions in the weeks immediately prior to the March decision, promising them that it was "a new day" and assuring them that their wish to continue using chlorpyrifos had been heard. Ryan Jackson, Pruitt's chief of staff, said in a March 8 email that he had "scared" career staff into going along with the political decision to deny the ban, adding "[T]hey know where this is headed and they are documenting it well." Emails also indicated that the decision was closely coordinated with the White House and the Department of Agriculture. Following the decision, the American Academy of Pediatrics said they were "deeply alarmed" and urged Pruitt to take chlorpyrifos off the market saying, "There is a wealth of science demonstrating the detrimental effects of chlorpyrifos exposure to developing fetuses, infants, children and pregnant women. The risk to infant and children's health and development is unambiguous."

Wendy Cleland-Hamnett, the agency's previous top official overseeing pesticides and toxic chemicals, said she first felt concern when the EPA's new leadership decided to reevaluate a plan to ban methylene chloride, and trichloroethylene. "It was extremely disturbing to me. The industry met with EPA political appointees. And then I was asked to change the agency's stand." In March 2017, Hamnett was again instructed to ignore the recommendation of EPA scientists and deny the ban of chlorpyrifos. Hamnett retired in September and was replaced by a toxicologist who has spent years helping businesses fight EPA restrictions.

In 2017, a coalition of attorneys general for several states, farm workers, and environmental groups sued then-EPA chief Scott Pruitt over his chlorpyrifos ban reversal. Saying that the EPA had "violated federal law by ignoring the conclusions of agency scientists that chlorpyrifos is harmful," on August 9, 2018, the United States Court of Appeals for the Ninth Circuit in San Francisco ordered the EPA to remove chlorpyrifos from sale in the United States within 60 days. In July 2019, the EPA announced it would not ban chlorpyrifos. In April 2021, under the Biden administration the EPA reversed the Trump ruling and restored the ban saying the EPA would follow science and "put health and safety first."

The US EPA had also recently taken a variety of actions to regulate the use of neonicotinoids, pesticides linked to declining bee numbers. In 2014, under the Obama presidency, a blanket ban was issued against the use of neonicotinoids in National Wildlife Refuges in response to concerns about off-target effects, and a lawsuit from environmental groups. In 2018, the Trump administration reversed this decision, stating that decisions on neonicotinoid usage on farms in wildlife refuges will be made on a case-by-case basis. The Trump decision also ended the policy of prohibiting large tracts of land to be used for the growing of biotech crops such as corn and soybeans in the refuges.

In 2020, the Trump EPA found that glyphosate, the main ingredient in the pesticide Roundup, did not expose people to a health risk. Its maker, Monsanto, is facing billions of dollars in payments to people who claim that glyphosate caused their cancers. In June 2022, the California Circuit Court of Appeals ordered the EPA to reexamine EPA's finding of no risk to human health because "it was not supported by substantial evidence" and that "EPA fell short of its obligations under the Endangered Species Act by inadequately examining glyphosate's impact on animal species and vegetation."

==== Lead paint standards ====
According to the EPA, lead poisoning is the number one environmental health threat for children ages 6 and younger. No new standards have been set since 2001, though it is agreed that the old standards need to be updated. In December 2017, after Pruitt requested six more years to regulate lead levels, a divided federal appeals court issued a writ of mandamus ordering Pruitt to regulate lead within the next 90 days. The Court called the lead paint risks for children "severe". In December 2020 the EPA announced new clearance levels for lead-contaminated dust from chipped or peeling lead-based paint. This dust can remain at the sites of lead removal activities, such as pre-1978 homes and childcare facilities. The change strengthened federal lead clearance level restrictions for the first time in almost 20 years.

==== PFOS and PFOA study publication withheld ====
Using information gained through a Freedom of Information Act request, in May 2018 it was learned that January 2018 emails between the EPA, the White House, and the Department of Health and Human Services (DHHS) showed an apparent decision to withhold the results of a study done by the DHHS Agency for Toxic Substances and Disease Registry (ATSDR) that was planned for publication. Looking at the chemicals widely known as PFOS and PFOA, the study showed that they endanger human health at a far lower level than EPA has previously called safe. They have been found to contaminate several areas, reaching water supplies near military bases, chemical plants, and other sites in the Mid-Atlantic and Midwest. One White House email said, "The public, media, and Congressional reaction to these numbers is going to be huge. The impact to EPA and [the Defense Department] is going to be extremely painful. We (DoD and EPA) cannot seem to get ATSDR to realize the potential public relations nightmare this is going to be." When questioned about the release of the study the White House referred questions to DHHS, which confirmed that the study has no scheduled release date. Pruitt's chief of staff, Ryan Jackson, defended EPA's decision to withhold the results of the study to "ensure that the federal government is responding in a uniform way to our local, state, and Congressional constituents and partners."

Members of Congress had a very strong reaction to the release of information regarding the withholding of the study, including Representative Brian Fitzpatrick, Representative Peter Welch, and Senator Patrick Leahy.

Pruitt conceded that his agency should take "concrete action" related to chemicals like PFAS, but testified that he was unaware of any delay in the release of the study. On May 16 Pruitt announced a "leadership summit" on PFOA, PFOS and related chemicals scheduled for the following week.

When the "invitation only" leadership summit was held on May 22 and 23, news agencies, including Politico, E&E News, and CNN were initially barred from the hearing. An Associated Press journalist was told she was not on the invitation list and forcibly removed from the room. CNN commented, "We understand the importance of an open and free press and we hope the EPA does, too," Jahan Wilcox, speaking for the EPA, justified the agency's actions by claiming the summit was not a "federal advisory committee event, " to which the public would be entitled to access, but instead was an opportunity "for EPA's state, tribal, and federal government partners and national organizations to share a range of individual perspectives" regarding PFASs. Senator Tom Udall, the ranking Democrat on a committee with oversight of EPA, did not agree. He sent a letter to Pruitt saying "Clean drinking water is a public health issue that does not belong behind closed doors."

=== Toxic waste clean-up ===
In attempts to lift regulations on oil, mining, drilling, and farming industries, the Trump administration proposed a 31% budget cut to the EPA that would result in reduced initiatives to protect water and air quality, leaving much of the effort up to the states. Environmentalists fear that these cuts will result in health problems. EPA budget cuts are also expected to lead to decreased regulation of hydraulic fracturing (fracking), which would result in less federal oversight of clean-up projects in these areas.

EPA administrator Scott Pruitt hired former Oklahoma banker Albert Kelly to head the Superfund program, which is responsible for cleaning up the nation's most contaminated land. Kelly completely lacked any experience with environmental issues, and had just received a lifetime ban from working in banking, his career until then.

=== Clean water legislation ===
==== Rollback of Obama administration regulations ====
Much of the Trump administration's efforts to decrease pollution regulation involved directly rescinding or overturning pollution regulations enacted under the Obama administration. In February 2017, Trump signed a resolution overturning President Obama's Stream Protection Rule, after being in effect for less than 30 days. When he signed the resolution repealing the rule, Trump predicted that striking down the rule would save thousands of U.S. mining-related jobs. The administration has also proposed a rollback on the Obama administration's extension of federal jurisdiction over lands protected by the Clean Water Act in attempts to reduce water pollution in areas surrounding toxic waste facilities.

==== Great Lakes Restoration Initiative ====
During Trump's first year in office he called for eliminating the Great Lakes Restoration Initiative, initiated by President Obama, and in the following two years he called for a 90% cut to the program. However Congress overruled him, giving the program $300 million each year. In 2019 he cut the program from $300 million to just $30 million. In March 2019, speaking at a rally in Michigan, which borders Lake Michigan, he commented:

I support the Great Lakes. Always have. They are beautiful. They are big, very deep. Record deepness, right? And I am going to get, in honor of my friends, full funding of $300 million for the Great Lakes Restoration Initiative which you have been trying to get for over 30 years. So, we will get it done.

==== Clean Water Rule ====
Soon after taking office, on February 28, 2017, President Trump signed an executive order to allow the EPA administrator to revise or rescind the Obama era Clean Water Rule, also referred to as Waters of the United States (WOTUS). The executive order cited a need to pursue "economic growth" and to avoid "regulatory uncertainty." Research cited by the EPA shows that one in every three Americans gets water from public drinking water systems which are partly sourced from streams protected by the Clean Water Rule. These streams may be in danger of pollution by industrial and agricultural waste, sewage, radioactive materials and a large number of other pollutants now covered by the Clean Water Rule. The Audubon Society has expressed concerns about a repeal of the Rule: "the Trump administration's intent is clear: to reverse Obama-era environmental protections no matter what, even if they have been effective at protecting avian and human life." On September 12, 2019, the Trump administration repealed the Clean Water Rule.

In August 2021 a federal judge nullified the Trump rule regarding the scope of waterways under federal protection which had significantly cut back on the range of waterways under federal supervision leaving vast areas vulnerable to potential pollution and degradation. The judge concluded that Trump officials were guilty of "serious errors" when putting the rule together and the Trump-era provisions that were put in place could culminate in "serious environmental harm."

In November 2021 the Army Corps of Engineers and the EPA announced that they would undo the Trump administration water regulations. The EPA said the new wording would be "updated to reflect consideration of Supreme Court decisions."

==== Clean Water Act ====
On April 10, 2019, President Trump issued two executive orders aimed at boosting the production of fossil fuels by cutting back on regulations he sees as"unnecessary red tape". The new regulations benefit energy companies by making it more difficult for states to block projects such as oil pipelines by using the Clean Water Act. Currently under Section 401 of the Clean Water Act, states can reject any project if they believe it could impact the state's water. Under Trump's order any decisions related to permits will no longer be made by the state secretary, but by the president.

On April 23, 2020, the Supreme Court ruled in County of Maui v. Hawaii Wildlife Fund that the federal Clean Water Act applies to pollution of underground water that flows into nearby bodies of water and streams. The Trump administration argued that the law didn't apply to groundwater. The decision came after a sewage treatment plant in Hawaii claimed that the law covered only "point sources" of pollution, such as an effluent pipe. Following months of investigation it was shown that the treatment plant was contaminating underground water which was seeping into the nearby ocean bay and harming sealife. The case was argued by Earth Justice; it was widely watched as a technical test case for future decisions related to the Clean Water Act.

In June 2020, the EPA finalized a rule which will end the long-standing rights of states, tribes and the public to object to federal permits for projects that could pollute waterways. The energy industry sees the change as a way to speed up oil pipelines and other projects, while environmentalists are concerned that it could undercut state and tribal efforts to safeguard rivers and drinking water. In June 2021 the administration of President Joe Biden announced that it would begin a new rulemaking to reverse the 2019/2020 replacement rule.

==== New lead standards ====
Saying "We are delivering on the president's commitment that all Americans have access to clean and safe drinking water," on October 10, 2019, the administration announced their proposals for new regulations on lead and copper in drinking water. The draft plan includes requirements that water utilities disclose inventories of lead service pipes and requires that daycare centers and schools report elevated lead levels within 24 hours rather than the current standard of 30 days. However, environmental activists are critical of the relaxation of other standards that have been proposed that slow the timetable for the replacement of lead pipes found to contain high levels of lead, extending the replacement time from 7 percent of lead service lines each year to just 3 percent. The Natural Resources Defense Council calls the slower timetable for lead pipe replacement "a huge weakening change that will swallow up the few small improvements in the proposal."

=== Clean Air Act standards ===
The Clean Air Act is a federal law designed to control air pollution on a national level. In June 2017, Pruitt announced that he would delay designating which areas met new National Ambient Air Quality Standards for ozone, a byproduct of pollutants from burning fossil fuels that has been linked to asthma. In August 2017, Pruitt said he would reverse that decision after being sued by 16 state attorneys general. In March 2018, Pruitt was finally ordered to do so by U.S. district judge Haywood Stirling Gilliam Jr.

As of May 2020, the Trump administration was trying to roll back restrictions on ethylene oxide, a carcinogenic air pollutant. It is widely used to produce antifreeze, fumigate crops, and sterilize medical equipment.

=== Coal emission standards ===
On August 21, 2018, the Trump administration announced plans to cut back Obama's coal emissions standards for coal-fired power plants, calling them "overly prescriptive and burdensome." The Trump plan increases the leeway given states to make their own decisions on coal emission standards, saying it "empowers states, promotes energy independence, and facilitates economic growth and job creation." Critics say the proposal would allow states to run and extend the life of older less efficient power plants and use less stringent emission guidelines for establishing new plants.

The New York Times reported in October 2019 that the Trump EPA planned to roll back or eliminate a 2015 limitation on coal-fired power plants releasing heavy metals like arsenic, lead and mercury into water supplies. In April 2020, the administration announced that the EPA had changed the way that they calculate the benefits of mercury controls. The changes will reduce the positive health effects of regulations on paper and raise their economic costs so as to loosen restrictions on any pollutant that the fossil fuel industry has deemed too costly to control. Environmental lawyers say that the new method will undermine the legal underpinnings of controls on mercury and many other pollutants. David Konisky, a professor of public and environmental affairs, said, "That is the big unstated goal. This is less about mercury than about potentially constraining or handcuffing future efforts by the E.P.A. to regulate air pollution."

On August 31, 2020, it was reported that the EPA finalized the reversal of regulations to prevent toxic waste from coal plants entering the water supply.

=== Landscape conservation cooperatives ===
Established under the Obama administration, Landscape conservation cooperatives (LCC) are research centers that address broad issues such as flooding, species extinction, and climate change. When Trump entered office he eliminated LCC funding in his budget proposals. However, following pressure from state fish and wildlife agencies, NGOs and tribal groups, Congress restored the LCC funding. In April 2019, it was reported that while Congress had set aside funding for LCC projects, the Trump administration had either closed 16 of the 22 research centers or put them on indefinite hiatus. Another six remain open receiving support from other sources.

== Rollback of the National Environmental Policy Act ==
Trump has frequently criticized environmental rules calling them "burdensome" and responsible for slowing work on infrastructure projects. In January 2020, Trump proposed changes in the Environmental impact statement process (EIS) as required by the National Environmental Policy Act (NEPA), which was passed in 1969. NEPA changed environmental oversight in the U.S. by requiring federal agencies to consider whether a project would harm the air, land, water or wildlife. Thus, NEPA has prevented federal agencies from dividing large projects into smaller chunks to make the environmental impact appear to be insignificant. For example, the proposal for a forest road would require that the impact of logging that it was built to accommodate be evaluated as well. NEPA also requires that the public be allowed to review and provide input on proposals. Democratic lawmakers and environmental groups have voiced concerns that Trump's proposals would gut environmental protections and remove the public's right to know and make comments of project's potential harms to the environment.

In June 2020, Trump further weakened standards when he signed an executive order to waive long-standing environmental laws and speed up approval for pipelines, highways, new mines, and other projects. On June 19 he declared that the COVID-19 pandemic had given rise to an economic "emergency" which evoked a section of federal law allowing "action with significant environmental impact" without observing normal requirements imposed by laws such as the National Environmental Policy Act or the Endangered Species Act.

In October 2021, the Biden Administration White House Council on Environmental Quality announced it planned to restore the NEPA policies which were rolled back under Trump. The changes will come in phases, beginning with reinstating the key aspects of the laws that were dismantled by the Trump administration.

== Climate change ==
NOAA's National Centers for Environmental Information (NCEI) has reported growing numbers of weather and climate-related events costing at least a billion dollars, exceeding the 1980–2019 inflation-adjusted average of 6.6 such events.

During the 2020 California wildfires

It'll start getting cooler. You just watch. ...
I don't think science knows, actually.

— Donald Trump, on climate change
September 13, 2020

Although in the scientific literature there is overwhelming scientific consensus that global surface temperatures have increased in recent decades and that the trend is caused by human-induced emissions of greenhouse gases, neither Trump nor any of the department heads he has appointed believe that global warming is human-related. Speaking in a 2017 interview he stated, "I have a natural instinct for science, and I will say that you have scientists on both sides of the picture." Calling himself "an environmentalist", he said, "Everything I want and everything I have is clean. Clean is very important – water, air. I want absolutely crystal clear water and I want the cleanest air on the planet and our air now is cleaner than it's ever been. Very important to me."

Following Trump's election large amounts of climate information from the EPA website was altered or removed. There was widespread concern among environmentalists and scientists and a coalition of scientific and academic groups began to make copies of the EPA web pages before they were deleted. According to the Environmental Data & Governance Initiative which tracks changes to government websites under the Trump administration, over 200 web pages providing climate information were omitted during Trump's first year in office. Other pages were altered to remove mentions of climate and climate change. In August 2017, the Trump administration rolled back regulations that required the federal government to account for climate change and sea-level rise when building infrastructure. Responding to a 2018 government-funded study which warned of potentially catastrophic climate change impacts, Trump said he had read part of the report but did not believe it.

In May 2019, The New York Times reported that the White House-appointed director of the United States Geological Survey (USGS), James Reilly, who has background in petroleum geology, ordered that the USGS only project impacts of climate change to 2040, instead of their previous practice of projecting to 2099. Thus, according to the Times, the 2022 National Climate Assessment, or other government reports on science, will not automatically include "such worst-case scenario projections". Models show that carbon emissions will only significantly change Earth's rate of warming around 2050. The Times also reported that the Trump administration is also planning to create a climate change review panel headed by William Happer, who is presently serving on Trump's United States National Security Council. Happer has repeatedly publicly stated, "the demonization of carbon dioxide is just like the demonization of the poor Jews under Hitler."

Democrats and Republicans differ in views of the seriousness of climate change, with the gap widening in the 2010s and Democrats more than three times as likely to view it as a major threat.

In June 2019, Trump's White House reportedly tried to prevent a State Department intelligence analyst, Rod Schoonover, from testifying to Congress about "possibly catastrophic" effects of human-caused climate change. Trump's White House reportedly prevented Schoonover's written testimony from being included in the official Congressional Record because it "doesn't reflect the coordinated [intelligence committee] position, or the administration's position". The National Security Council offered many criticisms of Schoonover's testimony, including a comment that "a consensus of peer reviewed literature has nothing to do with the truth." The New York Times quoted two anonymous sources as saying that the comments came from William Happer, a denier of the scientific consensus on global warming. The White House Office of Legislative Affairs also reportedly proposed removing five pages of testimony about the "Scientific Baseline" regarding climate change and the "Stresses to Human and Societal Systems" posed by climate change. Schoonover resigned July 2019. In 2020, looking back at the Trump administration's first term policy changes, some environmentalists believe that a second Trump term would mean severe and irreversible changes in the climate.

During the summer of 2020 numerous large fires burned thousands of acres with the loss of many homes and lives. Scientists report that they are related to climate changes which have increased the likelihood of more fires that will burn more widely and intensely than in the past. Trump was briefed in September on the status of fires in California–more than two dozen were burning at that time. Wade Crowfoot, California's secretary for natural resources and other officials repeatedly urged him to consider the role of global warming. Trump replied, "It'll start getting cooler. You just—you just watch" and Crowfoot replied, "I wish science agreed with you." Trump replied, "Well, I don't think science knows, actually." By the early 2020s, Trump's administration generally changed the framing of the issue from denial to dismissal: diminishing, ridiculing or rejecting the idea that climate change should be mitigated or even studied.

The Sabin Center for Climate Change listed 175 deregulations made by the Trump administration.

=== Paris Climate Agreement ===
On June 1, 2017, Trump announced United States withdrawal from the Paris Agreement, causing the U.S. to become the third out of 197 nations worldwide to not sign the agreement. As of 2018 the remaining two nations signed and the U.S. is the only nation that has not ratified the Paris Agreement. Since the terms of the agreement prohibit any country from withdrawing during the first three years, the Trump decision to withdraw will not be finalized until November 2019 and then it will not become official for another year after that, the day after the 2020 presidential election.

Prior to withdrawal, the U.S. had pledged to reduce greenhouse gas emissions by 26–28% below 2005 levels by 2025 and assign $3 million in aid to foreign countries combating climate change. The withdrawal was supported by several Republican lawmakers who felt that backing out was in-line with Trump's "America First" policy and goals to diverge from the environmental policies of the Obama administration. The announcement has been criticized by many national and international leaders, domestic politicians, business leaders and academics, as well as a large majority of American citizens (7 out of 10 according to a study by the Yale Program on Climate Change Communication).

Trump opposed the agreement on the grounds that it would compromise U.S. sovereignty and cause many Americans to lose their jobs. Proponents of the agreement argue, however, that backing out will result in a loss for our economy as new green jobs are offered instead to competitors overseas. Trump also announced his attempts to reach a negotiation with leaders involved in the agreement, who responded saying that the accord was "non-negotiable."

The process of withdrawal is expected to take several years, and in the meantime there has been a vocal resistance on the state and local levels. Hawaii became the first state to independently commit to the goals initially lined out by the accord. Shortly after Trump's announcement, state governments in California, New York, and Washington founded the United States Climate Alliance to continue advancing the objectives of the Paris Agreement. The sentiment has also been expressed by other state governors, by mayors and businesses, and the alliance now has 10 states with governors of both the Democratic and Republican parties pledging to abide by the agreement. Additionally, shortly after withdrawal California governor Jerry Brown met personally with President Xi Jinping of China to declare the states' compliance with the Paris Accord. In September 2017, some administration officials stated that the administration remains open to staying in the agreement "under the right conditions."

=== Clean Power Plan ===
The Clean Power Plan, first proposed in 2014, was an Obama administration policy aimed at combating global warming. The plan's goal was to move away from coal and instead use renewable energy or gas to generate electricity, which would reduce particulate matter in the environment. On March 1, 2017, Murray Energy Corporation sent a letter to the Trump administration with an Action Plan "which will help getting America's coal miners back to work." Doing away with Obama's Clean Power Plan was at the top of the list. Their second priority was doing away with the "endangerment finding" (the legal and scientific foundation for climate action) in the Clean Air Act. Their third priority was the elimination of tax credits for solar panels and windmills, and fourth was the withdrawal from the Paris Climate Accord. Other suggestions included cutting back of EPA staffing to at least half. On March 28, 2017, Trump signed an executive order to withdraw and rewrite Obama's Clean Power Plan, aimed at reviving the coal mining industry and unburdening the automotive industry. EPA staff emails obtained through a Freedom of Information Act request submitted by the Environmental Defense Fund in 2018 show that, within days of Trump's announcement, EPA director Scott Pruitt directed EPA staff to remove much of the climate change information from the agency's website and "[modify] search results for 'Clean Power Plan' to feature a page touting Trump's executive order featuring a photo of the president posing with smiling coal miners, Pruitt and other members of his cabinet."

In May 2019, Administrator Andrew Wheeler announced plans to change the way the EPA calculates health risks of air pollution, resulting in the reporting of far fewer health-related deaths and making it easier to roll back the Obama administration's Clean Power Plan. The Trump administration has argued that the Obama administration over-estimated the health risks for various environmental regulations, to the detriment of industry. Administrator Wheeler defended the change as a way to rectify inconsistencies in the current cost-benefit analyses used by the agency. The new plan is known as the Affordable Clean Energy rule (ACE). The planned changes were hailed by industry representatives.

Environmentalists are fighting the administration's power plant regulation rollbacks. In April 2020, several environmental groups and twenty-two states filed their first legal briefs in an attempt to fight the administration's attempt to loosen emission standards. Environmentalists were concerned that the new standards are so limited in the pollution controls it requires power producers to install that it could hamstring future administrations from addressing climate-altering pollution. On January 19, 2021, the federal United States Court of Appeals for the District of Columbia Circuit ruled the Affordable Clean Energy rule violated the Clean Air Act, leaving the administration of incoming President Joe Biden to make a rule from scratch.

=== Carbon Monitoring System ===
The Carbon Monitoring System (CMS) is a NASA remote monitoring system used to measure carbon dioxide and methane, using instruments placed in satellites and aircraft. The information provided by the CMS can be used to verify the national emission cuts agreed to in the Paris climate accords. CMS has also supported other research projects including providing information that has helped countries assess their carbon emissions from deforestation and forest degradation. In April 2018, President Trump ended funding for the CMS.

=== 2016 methane rule ===
In September 2018, the Trump administration submitted plans to roll back Obama-era legislation designed to reduce venting, flaring, and other emissions of methane gas by the oil and gas industry. At that time it was believed that the proposed new rule would put an additional 380,000 tons of methane into the atmosphere from 2019 to 2025, an amount that is roughly equivalent to more than 30 million tons of carbon dioxide. The Trump EPA noted that while increased pollution as a result of the proposal "may also degrade air quality and adversely affect health and welfare," their plan will save $75 million in regulatory costs annually. Governor Jerry Brown of California called the administration's proposal "perhaps the most obvious and dangerous and irresponsible action by Mr. Trump – and that's saying quite a lot." In August 2020, Trump rolled back the methane rule even as new scientific studies showed that methane is contributing even more to global warming than previously thought.

=== Disbanding the social cost of carbon group ===
In March 2017, Trump signed an executive order which disbanded the Interagency Working Group on Social Cost of Greenhouse Gases and withdrew the documents in which the group set forth a social cost of carbon which monetized the effects of greenhouse gas emissions. The system was introduced by Obama who claimed that "no challenge poses a greater threat to future generations than climate change." His administration set the social cost of Carbon at $51 per ton. Trump slashed the cost to $7 per ton. Forbes wrote, "President Trump's new order is an about face, directing agencies to evaluate many of those regulations and to 'suspend, revise, or rescind' them." In February 2021, President Biden restored the Obama-era working group and brought the cost of carbon back up to $51 (~$58.00 in 2024) per ton. In February 2022, a Trump-appointed judge reversed the social cost of carbon back to back to Trump's estimate of $7 per ton. The reversal was a result of a lawsuit of 10 Republican attorneys general.

=== 2018 National Climate Assessment ===
President Trump states "I've seen it, I've read some of it and it's fine." and "I don't believe it."

In November 2018, the government released its Fourth National Climate Assessment, largely compiled during the Obama Administration. The report, issued every four years, is written by 13 federal agencies and more than 300 leading climate scientists. The report warns of the potential catastrophic impacts of climate change including changes to the availability of food and water, increasing extreme weather and decreasing air quality, and the spread of new diseases by insects and pests. When questioned about the report President Trump replied, "I've seen it. I've read some of it. It's fine [but] I don't believe it."

Following its release the Trump Administration criticized the report saying it was not factually based. Acting EPA head Andrew Wheeler said he "wouldn't be surprised if the Obama administration directed authors to the worst-case scenario." Wheeler's statement was followed by an EPA press release which said that Wheeler "was right" adding, "In fact, the Obama administration did just that." The EPA used a report done by the Daily Caller, a conservative website founded by Fox News pundit Tucker Carlson, as proof of their claims. FactCheck.Org found the Caller's claims to be "false, exaggerated or unsubstantiated."

In October, the United Nations Intergovernmental Panel on Climate Change released a report that had been commissioned by policymakers at the Paris climate talks in 2016. The report, authored by the world's leading climate scientists, warned there are only 12 years for global warming to be kept to a maximum of 1.5C, beyond which "even half a degree will significantly worsen the risks of drought, floods, extreme heat and poverty for hundreds of millions of people."

=== G7 meetings ===
Trump attended the 44th G7 summit held in Canada in 2018 and the 45th G7 summit held in France in 2019. G7 Summits are conferences held between industrialized nations to discuss world affairs. Trump arrived late for the 2018 meeting, missing the full discussions on gender equality. He left early to attend a meeting with Kim Jong Un, choosing to not take part in the discussions about climate change and cleaning up the oceans which were being held on the third day of the summit meetings.

On the third day of the 2019 G7 talks world leaders discussed climate change, biodiversity, and warming oceans. A spokesperson said Trump had to skip the discussion due to a scheduled meeting with Chancellor Angela Merkel and Prime Minister Narendra Modi, although they were both attending the climate meeting. Later in the day when reporters asked him about the climate session he replied, "We're having it in a little while." although the meeting had already taken place. At a press conference Trump said he was "an environmentalist" adding, "I think I know more about the environment than most people."

The 46th G7 summit was scheduled to be held somewhere in the United States in 2020. In October 2019, Trump's chief of staff Mick Mulvaney announced that the event would be held at the Trump National Doral Miami, a golf resort in Florida which is owned by Trump. Mulvaney told reporters "Climate change will not be on the agenda." The state of Florida is the state most vulnerable to the effects of global warming such as rising ocean levels and more severe storms. The 46th G7 summit was cancelled due to the COVID-19 pandemic.

== Lawsuits ==
During its first few months, the Trump administration rescinded rules limiting mercury and air toxins from power plants, limiting water pollution from coal plants, banning the pesticide chlorpyrifos, and banning methane emissions from landfills, among other rules, which has resulted in lawsuits from various environmental groups such as the Environmental Defense Fund and the Natural Resources Defense Council.

Some lawsuits against the Trump administration's regulation rollbacks have been successful, such as a lawsuit from the Environmental Defense Fund and other environmental groups against the administration's decision to suspend a rule which limited methane emissions from oil and gas wells, a decision which was overturned by the United States Court of Appeals for the District of Columbia Circuit. Following legal action, the administration has also reversed its decision to do away with an Obama-era plan requiring dentists to prevent about five tons of mercury, used in their practice, from getting into the nation's waterways.

By February 2018, New York's attorney general Eric Schneiderman had filed over 50 lawsuits opposing the Trump administration's environmental revisions, saying New York had "beaten back" several of the administration's deregulation attempts, "from energy efficiency rollbacks to smog."

In November 2022, the United States Court of Appeals for the Ninth Circuit, overruled a 3-judge panel of the court and scheduled a rehearing of the case against the Trump administration-proposed land swap in Alaska to allow a road through the Izembek National Wildlife Refuge. In an unusual action, President Jimmy Carter filed a statement of support for the environmental-groups' lawsuit, saying the swap violated the Alaska National Interest Lands Conservation Act (Anilca). Anilca was passed in 1980 near the end of Carter's term in office. Carter said the act "may be the most significant domestic achievement of my political life" at the time of his filing.

== Commentary ==
Trump environmental policies drew comments from environmentalists and others.

=== Noam Chomsky ===
Speaking in April 2020 during the coronavirus emergency, Noam Chomsky noted that when Trump and his administration released their budget for the coming year they had defunded the CDC and other government institutions responsible for health while increasing the administration's funding for fossil fuel production. While calling the pandemic "bad and serious", Chomsky said the U.S. will recover, however, "We're not going to recover from the melting of the polar ice sheets, which is leading to a feedback effect, well known, that increases — as they melt, there's less reflective surface, more absorption in the dark seas. The warming that's melting increases. That's just one of the factors that's leading to destruction, unless we do something about it."

=== Biden administration's restoration of pre-Trump policies ===
Writing in January 2021, The New York Times noted that while President Biden had run on a policy "to restore environmental protections frayed over the past four years [and] ordered the review of more than 100 rules and regulations on air, water, public lands, endangered species and climate change that were weakened or rolled back by his predecessor," it could take two to three years or even most of Biden's term in office to restore many of the previous environmental rules. While The Times noted that in a limited number of cases Biden would be able to use executive authority to cancel some projects, such as the Keystone XL pipeline, others could take years.

== See also ==
- Carbon bubble
- List of lawsuits involving Donald Trump
- March for Science
- People's Climate March (2017)
- Trump administration political interference with science agencies
- Space-based measurements of carbon dioxide, * Greenhouse Gases Observing Satellite, and TanSat
