= United States federal register of greenhouse gas emissions =

The United States federal register of greenhouse gas emissions is established by the United States Department of Energy under the Energy Policy Act 1992. It is administered by the Energy Information Administration through the Voluntary Reporting of Greenhouse Gases Program.

Separately, the Environmental Protection Agency in 2009 commenced implementing a mandatory Greenhouse Gas Reporting Program, which applies to facilities that emit 25,000 metric tons or more per year.

== See also ==
- Climate change in the United States
- The Climate Registry
- Regional Greenhouse Gas Initiative
- Western Regional Climate Action Initiative
- Intergovernmental Panel on Climate Change
