= List of Yoshinobu Launch Complex launches =

The following list provides details for launches at the Yoshinobu Launch Complex. Part of the Tanegashima Space Center, the facility hosts JAXA's major test firings and launches. Other launch facilities in the Space Center were previously used, with small rockets under development launched from the Takesaki Range. Additionally, the Osaki Launch Complex, where larger rockets were initially launched, was retired in 1992. This list is sourced from the JAXA website.

== Launches ==
=== 1994-1999 ===
Flight No.	Date / time (UTC)	Rocket, Configuration	Launch site / Pad	Payload	Payload mass	Orbit	Users	Launch outcome
TF1 (Test Flight 1)	3 February 1994; 22:20	H-II	Tanegashima, LA-Y1	OREX (Orbital Re-entry Experiment) / VEP (Vehicle Evaluation Payload)	LEO / GTO			Success
TF1 (Test Flight 1)	Ryūsei and Myōjō							
TF2 (Test Flight 2)	28 August 1994; 07:50	H-II	Tanegashima, LA-Y1	ETS-VI (Engineering Test Satellite-VI)		GEO		Success
TF2 (Test Flight 2)	Kiku 6							
TF3 (Test Flight 3)	18 March 1995; 08:01	H-II	Tanegashima, LA-Y1	Geostationary Meteorological Satellite-5 (GMS-5) / Space Flyer Unit (SFU)		GEO / LEO		Success
TF3 (Test Flight 3)	Himawari 5							
F4	17 August 1996; 01:53	H-II	Tanegashima, LA-Y1	ADEOS I (Advanced Earth Observing Satellite) / Fuji-OSCAR 29, JAS-2		LEO		Success
F4	Midori and Fuji 3							
F6	27 November 1997; 21:27	H-II	Tanegashima, LA-Y1	TRMM (Tropical Rainfall Measuring Mission) / ETS-VII (Engineering Test Satellite-VII)		LEO		Success
F6	Orihime and Kiku 7 (Hikoboshi)							
F5	21 February 1998; 07:55	H-II	Tanegashima, LA-Y1	COMETS (Communications and Broadcasting Engineering Test Satellites)		GEO		Partial failure
F5	Kakehashi, Faulty brazing in second-stage engine cooling system caused engine burn through and cable damage resulting in shutdown midway through the upper stage's second burn, leaving spacecraft in elliptical LEO instead of GTO. Spacecraft thrusters raised orbit enough to complete some communications experiments.							
F8	15 November 1999; 07:29	H-II	Tanegashima, LA-Y1	MTSAT (Multi-functional Transport Satellite)		GEO		Failure
F8	Cavitation in the first stage hydrogen turbopump impeller caused an impeller blade to fracture, resulting in loss of fuel and rapid shutdown of the engine at T+239 seconds. The vehicle impacted the ocean 380 km at the northwest of Chichijima.							
=== 2001 ===
Flight No.	Date / time (UTC)	Rocket, Configuration	Launch site / Pad	Payload	Payload mass	Orbit	Users	Launch outcome
TF1 (Test Flight 1)	29 August 2001; 07:00:00	H-IIA 202	Tanegashima, LA-Y1	VEP 2 (Vehicle Evaluation Payload 2) / LRE				Success
=== 2002 ===
Flight No.	Date / time (UTC)	Rocket, Configuration	Launch site / Pad	Payload	Payload mass	Orbit	Users	Launch outcome
TF2 (Test Flight 2)	4 February 2002; 02:45:00	H-IIA 2024	Tanegashima, LA-Y1	VEP 3 (Vehicle Evaluation Payload 3) / Mission Demonstration Satellite 1 (MDS-1) (Tsubasa) / DASH				Success
F3	10 September 2002; 08:20:00	H-IIA 2024	Tanegashima, LA-Y1	USERS / DRTS (Kodama)				Success
F4	14 December 2002; 01:31:00	H-IIA 202	Tanegashima, LA-Y1	ADEOS II (Midori 2) / WEOS (Kanta-kun) / FedSat 1 / Micro LabSat 1				Success
=== 2003 ===
Flight No.	Date / time (UTC)	Rocket, Configuration	Launch site / Pad	Payload	Payload mass	Orbit	Users	Launch outcome
F5	28 March 2003; 01:27:00	H-IIA 2024	Tanegashima, LA-Y1	IGS-Optical 1 / IGS-Radar 1				Success
F6	29 November 2003; 04:33:00	H-IIA 2024	Tanegashima, LA-Y1	IGS-Optical (2nd) / IGS-Radar (2nd)				Failure
F6	A hot gas leak from one SRB-A motor destroyed its separation system. The strap-on did not separate as planned, and the weight of the spent motor prevented the vehicle from achieving its planned height.							
=== 2005 ===
Flight No.	Date / time (UTC)	Rocket, Configuration	Launch site / Pad	Payload	Payload mass	Orbit	Users	Launch outcome
F7	26 February 2005; 09:25:00	H-IIA 2022	Tanegashima, LA-Y1	MTSAT-1R (Himawari 6)				Success
=== 2006 ===
Flight No.	Date / time (UTC)	Rocket, Configuration	Launch site / Pad	Payload	Payload mass	Orbit	Users	Launch outcome
F8	24 January 2006; 01:33:00	H-IIA 2022	Tanegashima, LA-Y1	ALOS (Daichi)				Success
F9	18 February 2006; 06:27:00	H-IIA 2024	Tanegashima, LA-Y1	MTSAT-2 (Himawari 7)				Success
F10	11 September 2006; 04:35:00	H-IIA 202	Tanegashima, LA-Y1	IGS-Optical 2				Success
F11	18 December 2006; 06:32:00	H-IIA 204	Tanegashima, LA-Y1	ETS-VIII (Kiku 8)		GTO		Success
=== 2007 ===
Flight No.	Date / time (UTC)	Rocket, Configuration	Launch site / Pad	Payload	Payload mass	Orbit	Users	Launch outcome
F12	24 February 2007; 04:41:00	H-IIA 2024	Tanegashima, LA-Y1	IGS-Radar 2 / IGS-Optical 3V				Success
F13	14 September 2007; 01:31:01	H-IIA 2022	Tanegashima, LA-Y1	SELENE (Kaguya)				Success
=== 2008 ===
Flight No.	Date / time (UTC)	Rocket, Configuration	Launch site / Pad	Payload	Payload mass	Orbit	Users	Launch outcome
F14	23 February 2008; 08:55:00	H-IIA 2024	Tanegashima, LA-Y1	WINDS (Kizuna)				Success
=== 2009 ===
Flight No.	Date / time (UTC)	Rocket, Configuration	Launch site / Pad	Payload	Payload mass	Orbit	Users	Launch outcome
F15	23 January 2009; 03:54:00	H-IIA 202	Tanegashima, LA-Y1	GOSAT (Ibuki) / SDS-1 / STARS (Space Tethered Autonomous Robotic Satellite) (Kūkai) / KKS-1 (Kiseki) / PRISM (Hitomi) / Sohla-1 (Maido 1) / SORUNSAT-1 (Kagayaki) / SPRITE-SAT (Raijin)				Success
F1	10 September 2009; 17:01:46	H-IIB	Tanegashima, LA-Y2	HTV-1				Success
F1	First flight of H-IIB							
F16	28 November 2009; 01:21:00	H-IIA 202	Tanegashima, LA-Y1	IGS-Optical 3				Success
=== 2010 ===
Flight No.	Date / time (UTC)	Rocket, Configuration	Launch site / Pad	Payload	Payload mass	Orbit	Users	Launch outcome
F17	20 May 2010; 21:58:22	H-IIA 202	LA-Y1, Tanegashima	PLANET-C (Akatsuki) / IKAROS / UNITEC-1 (Shin'en) / Waseda-SAT2 / K-Sat (Hayato) / Negai☆″				Success
F18	11 September 2010; 11:17:00	H-IIA 202	Tanegashima, LA-Y1	QZS-1 (Michibiki)				Success
=== 2011 ===
Flight No.	Date / time (UTC)	Rocket, Configuration	Launch site / Pad	Payload	Payload mass	Orbit	Users	Launch outcome
F2	22 January 2011; 05:37:57	H-IIB	Tanegashima, LA-Y2	Kounotori 2 (HTV-2)				Success
F19	23 September 2011; 04:36:50	H-IIA 202	Tanegashima, LA-Y1	IGS-Optical 4				Success
F20	12 December 2011; 01:21:00	H-IIA 202	Tanegashima, LA-Y1	IGS-Radar 3				Success
=== 2012 ===
Flight No.	Date / time (UTC)	Rocket, Configuration	Launch site / Pad	Payload	Payload mass	Orbit	Users	Launch outcome
F21	17 May 2012; 16:39:00	H-IIA 202	Tanegashima, LA-Y1	GCOM-W1 (Shizuku) / KOMPSAT-3 (Arirang 3) / SDS-4 / HORYU-2				Success
F3	21 July 2012; 02:06:18	H-IIB	Tanegashima, LA-Y2	Kounotori 3 (HTV-3) / Raiko / We Wish / Niwaka / TechEdSat / F-1				Success
F3	CubeSats carried aboard Kounotori 3, deployed on 4 October 2012 from the ISS.							
=== 2013 ===
Flight No.	Date / time (UTC)	Rocket, Configuration	Launch site / Pad	Payload	Payload mass	Orbit	Users	Launch outcome
F22	27 January 2013; 04:40:00	H-IIA 202	Tanegashima, LA-Y1	IGS-Radar 4 / IGS-Optical 5V				Success
F4	3 August 2013; 19:48:46	H-IIB	Tanegashima, LA-Y2	Kounotori 4 (HTV-4) / PicoDragon / ArduSat-1 / ArduSat-X / TechEdSat-3				Success
F4	CubeSats carried aboard Kounotori 4 for deployment from the ISS.							
=== 2014 ===
Flight No.	Date / time (UTC)	Rocket, Configuration	Launch site / Pad	Payload	Payload mass	Orbit	Users	Launch outcome
F23	27 February 2014; 18:37:00	H-IIA 202	Tanegashima, LA-Y1	GPM-Core / SindaiSat (Ginrei) / STARS-II (Gennai) / TeikyoSat-3 / ITF-1 (Yui) / OPUSAT (CosMoz) / INVADER / KSAT2				Success
F24	24 May 2014; 03:05:14	H-IIA 202	Tanegashima, LA-Y1	ALOS-2 (Daichi 2) / Raijin-2 (Rising-2) / UNIFORM-1 / SOCRATES / SPROUT				Success
F25	7 October 2014; 05:16:00	H-IIA 202	Tanegashima, LA-Y1	Himawari 8				Success
F26	3 December 2014; 04:22:04	H-IIA 202	Tanegashima, LA-Y1	Hayabusa 2 / Shin'en 2 / ARTSAT2-DESPATCH / PROCYON				Success
=== 2015 ===
Flight No.	Date / time (UTC)	Rocket, Configuration	Launch site / Pad	Payload	Payload mass	Orbit	Users	Launch outcome
F27	1 February 2015; 01:21:00	H-IIA 202	Tanegashima, LA-Y1	IGS-Radar Spare				Success
F28	26 March 2015; 01:21:00	H-IIA 202	Tanegashima, LA-Y1	IGS-Optical 5				Success
F5	19 August 2015; 11:50:49	H-IIB	Tanegashima, LA-Y2	Kounotori 5 (HTV-5) / SERPENS / S-CUBE / Flock-2b x 14 / GOMX-3 / AAUSAT5				Success
F5	CubeSats carried aboard Kounotori 5 for deployment from the ISS.							
F29	24 November 2015; 06:50:00	H-IIA 204	Tanegashima, LA-Y1	Telstar 12 Vantage		GTO		Success
=== 2016 ===
Flight No.	Date / time (UTC)	Rocket, Configuration	Launch site / Pad	Payload	Payload mass	Orbit	Users	Launch outcome
F30	17 February 2016; 08:45:00	H-IIA 202	Tanegashima, LA-Y1	ASTRO-H (Hitomi) / ChubuSat-2 (Kinshachi 2) / ChubuSat-3 (Kinshachi 3) / Horyu-4				Success
F30	The Hitomi telescope broke apart 37 days after launch.							
F31	2 November 2016; 06:20:00	H-IIA 202	Tanegashima, LA-Y1	Himawari 9				Success
F6	9 December 2016; 13:26:47	H-IIB	Tanegashima, LA-Y2	Kounotori 6 (HTV-6) / AOBA-Velox III / TuPOD / EGG / ITF-2 / STARS-C / FREEDOM / WASEDA-SAT3				Success
F6	CubeSats carried aboard Kounotori 6 for deployment from the ISS.							
=== 2017 ===
Flight No.	Date / time (UTC)	Rocket, Configuration	Launch site / Pad	Payload	Payload mass	Orbit	Users	Launch outcome
F32	24 January 2017; 07:44:00	H-IIA 204	Tanegashima, LA-Y1	DSN-2 (Kirameki 2)		GTO		Success
F33	17 March 2017; 01:20:00	H-IIA 202	Tanegashima, LA-Y1	IGS-Radar 5				Success
F34	1 June 2017; 00:17:46	H-IIA 202	Tanegashima, LA-Y1	QZS-2 (Michibiki 2)				Success
F35	19 August 2017; 05:29:00	H-IIA 204	Tanegashima, LA-Y1	QZS-3 (Michibiki 3)		GTO		Success
F36	9 October 2017; 22:01:37	H-IIA 202	Tanegashima, LA-Y1	QZS-4 (Michibiki 4)				Success
F37	23 December 2017; 01:26:22	H-IIA 202	Tanegashima, LA-Y1	GCOM-C (Shikisai) / SLATS (Tsubame)				Success
=== 2018 ===
Flight No.	Date / time (UTC)	Rocket, Configuration	Launch site / Pad	Payload	Payload mass	Orbit	Users	Launch outcome
F38	27 February 2018; 04:34:00	H-IIA 202	Tanegashima, LA-Y1	IGS-Optical 6				Success
F39	12 June 2018; 04:20:00	H-IIA 202	Tanegashima, LA-Y1	IGS-Radar 6				Success
F7	22 September 2018; 17:52:27	H-IIB	Tanegashima, LA-Y2	Kounotori 7 (HTV-7) / SPATIUM-I / RSP-00 / STARS-Me				Success
F7	CubeSats carried aboard Kounotori 7 for deployment from the ISS.							
F40	29 October 2018; 04:08:00	H-IIA 202	Tanegashima, LA-Y1	GOSAT-2 (Ibuki-2) / KhalifaSat / Ten-Koh / Diwata-2B / Stars-AO (Aoi) / AUTcube2 (GamaCube)				Success
=== 2019 ===
Flight No.	Date / time (UTC)	Rocket, Configuration	Launch site / Pad	Payload	Payload mass	Orbit	Users	Launch outcome
F8	24 September 2019; 16:05:05	H-IIB	Tanegashima, LA-Y2	Kounotori 8 (HTV-8) / NARSSCube-1 / AQT-D / RWASAT-1				Success
F8	CubeSats carried aboard of Kounotori 8 for deployment from the ISS.							
=== 2020 ===
Flight No.	Date / time (UTC)	Rocket, Configuration	Launch site / Pad	Payload	Payload mass	Orbit	Users	Launch outcome
F41	9 February 2020; 01:34:00	H-IIA 202	Tanegashima, LA-Y1	IGS-Optical 7				Success
F9	20 May 2020; 17:31:00	H-IIB	Tanegashima, LA-Y2	Kounotori 9 (HTV-9)				Success
F9	Kounotori 9 launch to the ISS. The last launch of both the launch vehicle and vehicle, awaiting new fleet of HTV-X and H3.							
F42	19 July 2020; 21:58:14	H-IIA 202	Tanegashima, LA-Y1	Emirates Mars Mission	1350 kg	Heliocentric	Mohammed bin Rashid Space Centre	Success
F42	Emirates Mars Mission launched to planet Mars.							
F43	29 November 2020; 07:25:00	H-IIA 202	Tanegashima, LA-Y1	JDRS/LUCAS		GTO		Success
=== 2021 ===
Flight No.	Date / time (UTC)	Rocket, Configuration	Launch site / Pad	Payload	Payload mass	Orbit	Users	Launch outcome
F44	26 October 2021; 02:19:37	H-IIA 202	Tanegashima, LA-Y1	QZS-1R	about 4t	IGSO	Cabinet Office	Success
F44	Replacement for QZS-1 (Michibiki-1).							
F45	22 December 2021; 15:32:00	H-IIA 204	Tanegashima, LA-Y1	Inmarsat-6 F1	5,470 kg	GTO (supersynchronous)	Inmarsat	Success
F45	Final flight of H-IIA 204.							
=== 2023 ===
Flight No.	Date / time (UTC)	Rocket, Configuration	Launch site / Pad	Payload	Payload mass	Orbit	Users	Launch outcome
F46	26 January 2023; 01:50:21	H-IIA 202	Tanegashima, LA-Y1	IGS-Radar 7		SSO	CIRO	Success
TF1 (Test Flight 1)	7 March 2023 01:37:55	H3-22S	Tanegashima, LA-Y2	ALOS-3	3,000 kg	SSO	JAXA	Failure
TF1 (Test Flight 1)	First H3 flight. Second stage ignition failed, leading to flight termination.							
F47	6 September 2023; 23:42:11	H-IIA 202	Tanegashima, LA-Y1	XRISM / SLIM	3,015 kg	LEO / Selenocentric	JAXA / NASA	Success
=== 2024 ===
Flight No.	Date / time (UTC)	Rocket, Configuration	Launch site / Pad	Payload	Payload mass	Orbit	Users	Launch outcome
F48	12 January 2024; 04:44:26	H-IIA 202	Tanegashima, LA-Y1	IGS-Optical 8		SSO	CIRO	Success
TF2 (Test Flight 2)	17 February 2024 00:22:55	H3-22S	Tanegashima, LA-Y2	VEP-4 (Mass simulator), CE-SAT-1E, TIRSAT	2,675 kg	SSO	JAXA	Success
TF2 (Test Flight 2)	Second H3 test flight and first launch success.							
F3	1 July 2024; 03:06	H3-22S	Tanegashima, LA-Y2	ALOS-4	2,990 kg	SSO	JAXA	Success
F49	26 September 2024; 05:24:20	H-IIA 202	Tanegashima, LA-Y1	IGS-Radar 8		SSO	CIRO	Success
F4	4 November 2024; 06:48	H3-22S	Tanegashima, LA-Y2	DSN-3		GTO	DSN / JDSF	Success
=== 2025 ===
Flight No.	Date / time (UTC)	Rocket, Configuration	Launch site / Pad	Payload	Payload mass	Orbit	Users	Launch outcome
F5	2 February 2025; 08:30	H3-22S	Tanegashima, LA-Y2	QZS-6	4,900 kg	GTO	CAO	Success
F50	28 June 2025; 16:33	H-IIA 202	Tanegashima, LA-Y1	GOSAT-GW	2,600 kg	SSO	JAXA	Success
F50	Final flight of H-IIA 202, and H-II family as a whole.							
F7	26 October 2025; 00:00:15	H3-24W	Tanegashima, LA-Y2	HTV-X1		LEO (ISS)	JAXA	Success
F7	First HTV-X resupply mission.							

== Planned launches ==
Date / time (UTC)	Rocket, Configuration	Launch site / Pad	Payload	Orbit	Customer
2025	H3-30S	Tanegashima, LA-Y2	VEP-5 (Mass Simulator), PETREL, STARS-X, VERTECS, BRO, HORN L, R	LEO	JAXA and others
2025	Flight 6.				
2025	H3	Tanegashima, LA-Y2	QZS-5	GTO	JAXA
2025	H3	Tanegashima, LA-Y2	QZS-7	GTO	JAXA
2025	H3	Tanegashima, LA-Y2	ETS-9 (Kiku-9)	GEO	JAXA / NICT
2026	H3-24L	Tanegashima, LA-Y2	HTV-X2	LEO (ISS)	JAXA
2026	H3-24L	Tanegashima, LA-Y2	HTV-X3	LEO (ISS)	JAXA
2026	H3-24L	Tanegashima, LA-Y2	MMX	Areocentric	JAXA
2026	H3	Tanegashima, LA-Y2	IGS-Optical Diversification 1	SSO	CIRO
2026	First of a new generation of IGS-Optical satellites.				
2027	H3	Tanegashima, LA-Y2	IGS-Optical 9	SSO	CIRO
2027	H3	Tanegashima, LA-Y2	IGS-Optical Diversification 2	SSO	CIRO
2027	H3	Tanegashima, LA-Y2	JDRS-2	GEO	CIRO / JAXA
2028	H3	Tanegashima, LA-Y2	Himawari 10	GEO	JMA
2029	H3	Tanegashima, LA-Y2	IGS-Radar Diversification 1	SSO	CIRO
2029	First of a new generation of IGS-Radar satellites.				
2029	H3	Tanegashima, LA-Y2	IGS-Optical 10	SSO	CIRO
2030	H3	Tanegashima, LA-Y2	IGS-Radar Diversification 2	SSO	CIRO
2031	H3	Tanegashima, LA-Y2	IGS-Radar 9	SSO	CIRO
2032	H3	Tanegashima, LA-Y2	IGS-Optical Diversification Successor	SSO	CIRO
2032	H3	Tanegashima, LA-Y2	LiteBIRD	Sun–Earth L_{2}	JAXA
2033	H3	Tanegashima, LA-Y2	IGS-Radar 10	SSO	CIRO
2033	H3	Tanegashima, LA-Y2	IGS-Optical 11	SSO	CIRO
TBD	H3	Tanegashima, LA-Y2	Inmarsat TBA	GEO	Inmarsat
TBD	First commercial customer to launch on H3.				

Sources: Gunter's Space Page and Cabinet Office of Japan
