= Innovative Satellite Technology Demonstration Program =

Satellite demonstration program

The Innovative Satellite Technology Demonstration Program is a series of spacecraft missions for testing technology and ideas put forward by universities and private companies. The program demonstrates various experimental devices and technology in space by providing flight opportunities. It is managed by the JAXA Research and Development Directorate. According to JAXA, the goal of this program is to test high risk, innovative technology that will lead to the space industry gaining competitiveness in the international field.

== Innovative Satellite Technology Demonstration-1 ==
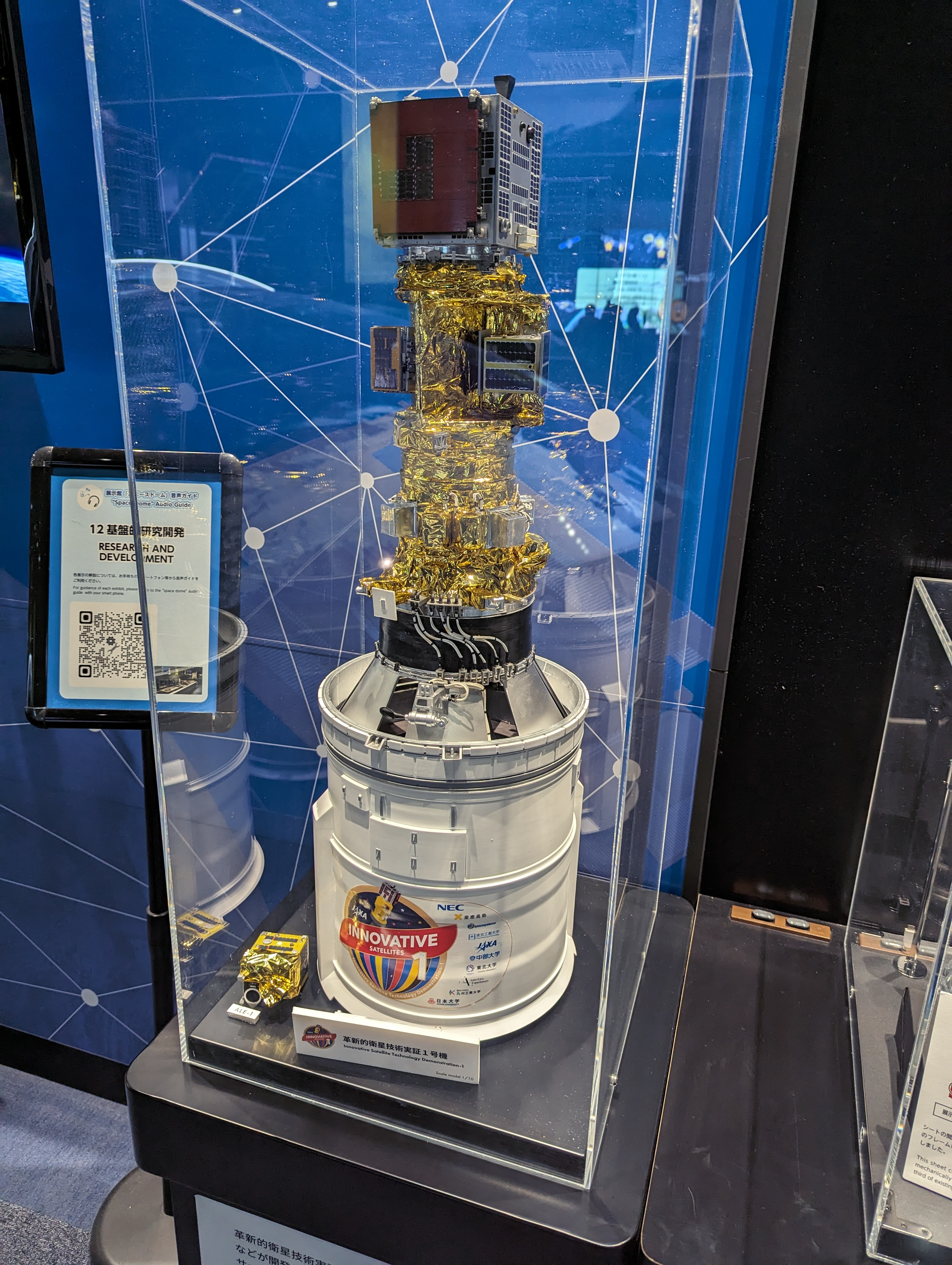
1:10 scale model of the Innovative Satellite Technology Demonstration-1 payloads, RAPIS-1 at the top

Innovative Satellite Technology Demonstration-1 was the first mission in the Innovative Satellite Technology Demonstration Program. The mission included several spacecraft, the largest being RAPIS-1, along with six smaller satellites. The call for proposals was announced in 2015, and selection results were announced in February 2016. A total of 14 projects were selected; however a proposal by IHI Corporation, the "Demonstration experiment of an innovative ship information receiving system" was later dropped, dropping the number of projects reaching space to 13. Seven projects were tested on board RAPIS-1, either as parts or components. Three projects flew as microsatellites, and three more as CubeSats.

Innovative Satellite Technology Demonstration-1 was successfully launched on 18 January 2019. Payloads flown on the mission were tested in space for a year, and the operational data gained were given to the developers. The Innovative Satellite Technology Demonstration-1 marked the first multi-satellite launch by Epsilon launch vehicle.

Project	Type	Agency
NBFPGA	Part	NEC Corporation
HXTX / XMGA	Component	Keio University
?	Component	IHI Corporation
GPRCS	Component	J-spacesystems
SPM	Component	J-spacesystems
DLAS	Component	Tokyo Institute of Technology
TMSAP	Component	JAXA
Fireant	Component	Chubu University
MicroDragon	Microsatellite	Keio University; Vietnam National Space Center
RISESAT	Microsatellite	Tohoku University
ALE-1	Microsatellite	ALE Co., Ltd.
OrigamiSat-1	CubeSat	Tokyo Institute of Technology
Aoba VELOX-IV	CubeSat	Kyushu Institute of Technology
NEXUS	CubeSat	Nihon University

=== RAPIS-1 ===
RAPIS-1 (RAPid Innovative payload demonstration Satellite 1) is a satellite within Innovative Satellite Technology Demonstration-1 that demonstrated selected projects as either parts or components. Of the 13 projects, 7 were demonstrated on board RAPIS-1.

==== Payload on RAPIS-1 ====
- The NanoBridge based Field Programmable Gate Array (NBFPGA) was developed by NEC Corporation
- High data rate X-band Transmitter (HXTX) / X-band Middle Gain Antenna (XMGA) was developed by Keio University
- The Green Propellant Reaction Control System (GPRCS) was developed by Japan Space Systems
- The Space Particle Monitor (SPM) was developed by Japan Space Systems
- The Deep Learning Attitude Sensor (DLAS) was developed by Tokyo Institute of Technology
- The Thin Membrane Solar Array Paddle (TMSAP) was developed by JAXA
- Fireant (Miniature Spaceborne GNSS Receiver) was developed by Chubu University

=== MicroDragon ===
MicroDragon is a microsatellite proposal submitted by Takashi Maeno of Keio University. It was developed by the VNSC (Vietnam National Satellite Center).

=== RISESAT ===
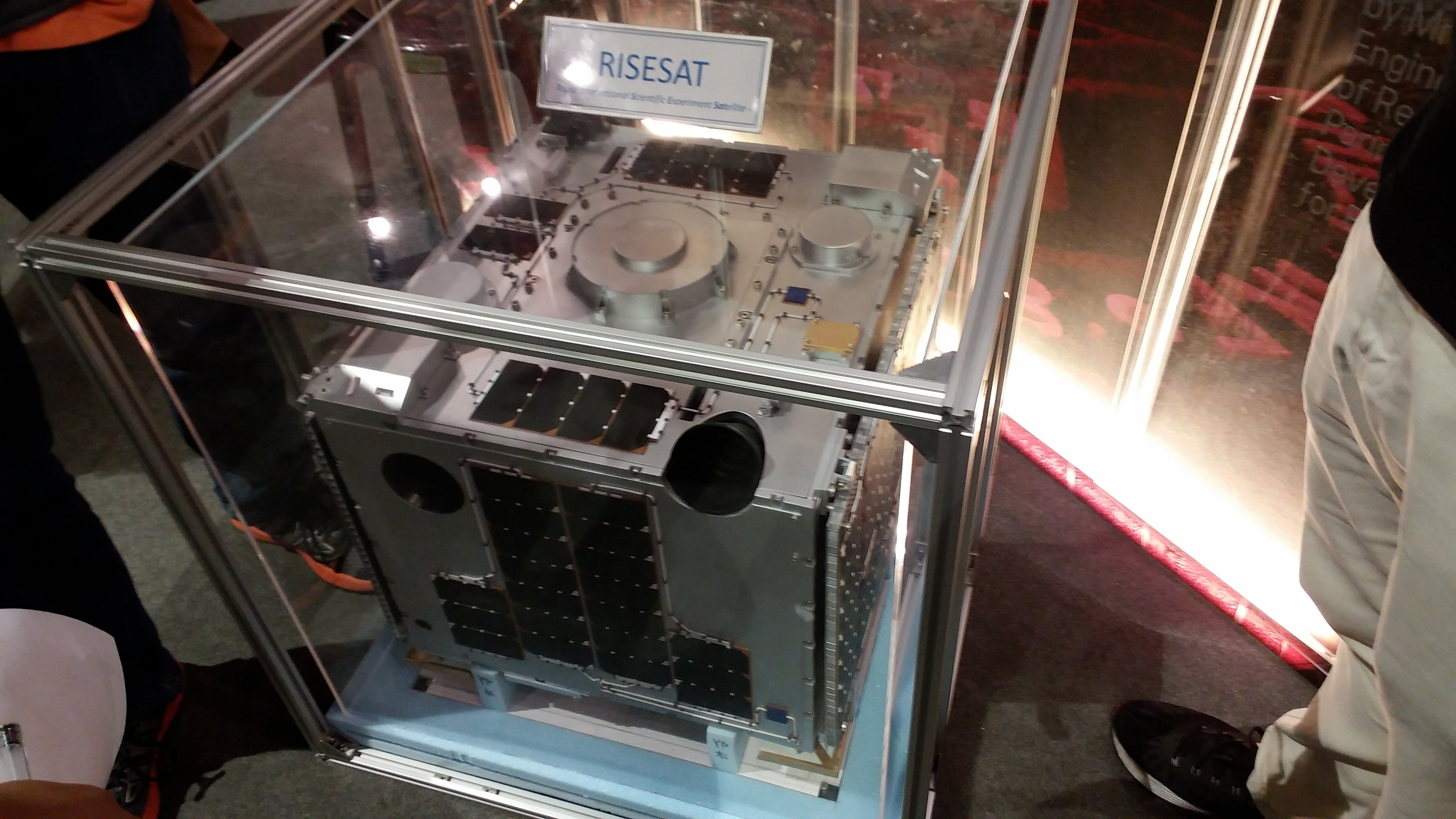
RISESAT components.

Rapid International Scientific Experiment Satellite (RISESAT), previously called Hodoyoshi 2, was a microsatellite developed by Tohoku University. It was equipped with scientific instruments that were selected on an international scale. RISESAT was selected for the Innovative Satellite Technology Demonstration Program to demonstrate highly precise attitude control and high resolution multispectral observation technology. RISESAT's high resolution multispectral camera was capable of measuring the growth rate and health of crops from space. RISESAT's remote sensing instrument, High Precision Telescope (HPT) utilizes a liquid crystal tunable filter. RISESAT decayed from orbit on 14 March 2023.

=== ALE-1 ===
ALE-1, also known as ALEe, was a microsatellite for demonstrating the creation of artificial shooting stars. Built and operated by ALE Co., Ltd., it was the company's first satellite. ALE-1 was equipped with a DOM2500 deorbit mechanism manufactured by Nakashimada Engineering Works, Ltd. The DOM2500 was a membrane sail 2.5 m × 2.5 m (8 ft 2 in × 8 ft 2 in) large when deployed, and was used by ALE-1 to lower its altitude to less than 400 km (250 mi), the optimal altitude to conduct its main mission. Once the satellite's altitude was sufficiently lowered, the DOM2500 was separated from ALE-1. The DOM2500 reentered the atmosphere on 3 August 2022, and ALE-1 is expected to re-enter the atmosphere in October 2023.

=== OrigamiSat-1 ===
OrigamiSat-1 (COSPAR 2019-003B, SATCAT 43933) was a 3U CubeSat developed by Tokyo Institute of Technology to demonstrate the deployment of large structures from a small, folded state. After being launched to an altitude of 500 km (310 mi), OrigamiSat-1 was designed to descend down to 400 km (250 mi), where it would deploy a 1m^{2} membrane. The satellite decayed from orbit on 30 April 2022.

=== Aoba VELOX-IV ===
Aoba VELOX-IV was a 2U CubeSat equipped with a low-light camera. It was jointly developed by Kyushu Institute of Technology in Japan and Nanyang Technological University (NTU) of Singapore. The pulsed plasma thrusters developed by NTU gave the CubeSat maneuvering capabilities, a necessity for a future lunar mission, as the Moon's irregular gravity field requires orbiters to perform orbit maintenance to extend its mission lifetime. It had a design lifetime of 12 months in low Earth orbit. The satellite decayed from orbit on 24 March 2023.

=== NEXUS ===
NEXUS, short for NExt generation X Unique Satellite is a 1U CubeSat developed by Nihon University. An amateur radio satellite, it is equipped with a transmitter with half the power consumption and a data transmission rate per second 32 times larger than a traditional amateur radio transmitter. NEXUS will demonstrate packet radio in space. The satellite decayed from orbit on 9 November 2023.

== Innovative Satellite Technology Demonstration-2 ==
The call for proposals for Innovative Satellite Technology Demonstration-2, the second mission of the program, was announced in July 2018, and selection results were announced in December of the same year. There are nine satellites launching on this mission: the RAISE-2 smallsat, four microsatellites and four CubeSats. The microsatellites HIBARI, Z-Sat and DRUMS are primarily for engineering tests. TeikyoSat-4, which was additionally selected in 2020, will conduct life science studies. The four CubeSats are ASTERISC, ARICA, NanoDragon, and KOSEN-1.

The Innovative Satellite Technology Demonstration 2 mission launched on 9 November 2021.

Project	Type	Agency
SPR	Part	Sony Semiconductor Solutions Corporation
I-FOG	Component	Tamagawa Seiki Co., Ltd.
ASC	Component	Amanogi, Corp.
3D-ANT	Component	Mitsubishi Electric
ATCD	Component	Tohoku University
MARIN	Component	JAXA
HIBARI	Microsatellite	Tokyo Institute of Technology
Z-Sat	Microsatellite	Mitsubishi Heavy Industries
DRUMS	Microsatellite	Kawasaki Heavy Industries
TeikyoSat-4	Microsatellite	Teikyo University
ASTERISC	CubeSat	Chiba Institute of Technology
ARICA	CubeSat	Aoyama Gakuin University
Advanced OBC of NanoDragon	CubeSat	Meisei Electric
KOSEN-1	CubeSat	National Institute of Technology, Kochi College

== Innovative Satellite Technology Demonstration-3 ==
Innovative Satellite Technology Demonstration-3's call for proposals was announced in January 2020, and in May 2020 JAXA announced the selection of 14 themes. On 22 January 2021, Shizuoka University's STARS-X microsatellite was additionally selected, bringing the total number of themes to 15. Among the 15 themes seven were on board the RAISE-3 smallsat, three are microsatellites and five were CubeSats. Of the three microsatellites, KOYOH will conduct astronomical observation of transient sources, PETREL will demonstrate a multispectral camera, and STARS-X will extend a 1 km long tether and collect space debris. For the CubeSats, MAGNARO was to demonstrate formation flight, MITSUBA was to test the degrading of COTS semiconductor parts, KOSEN-2 was to collect marine observation data, and WASEDA-SAT-ZERO was to demonstrate an integrated satellite chassis.

On 19 April 2022, IHI Aerospace (IA), the manufacturer of Epsilon rocket announced that it signed a contract with iQPS for the launch of two satellites. IA said that the two satellites will be launched on the sixth launch of Epsilon. In a subsequent press release JAXA announced that the two iQPS satellites will be launched together with Innovative Satellite Technology Demonstration-3, and that the three microsatellites originally manifested for the flight (KOYOH, PETREL, and STARS-X) will instead be launched on another rocket, which will be arranged by IA. For IA, the contract with iQPS marked its first contract to launch a commercial satellite. IA was previously selected by JAXA as the launch service provider for Epsilon S, an upgraded version of Epsilon. IA described its contract with iQPS as a forerunner to commercial launches on Epsilon S.

Project	Agency	Planned re-flight mission
LEOMI	Nippon Telegraph and Telephone	4
SDRX	NEC Space Technologies, Ltd.	Did not prefer a re-flight
GEMINI	Mitsubishi Electric	4
KIR	Pale Blue	4
TMU-PPT	Advanced Technology Institute	4
D-SAIL	Axelspace	4
HELIOS	Sakase Adtech Co., Ltd.	4
KOYOH	Kanazawa University	-
PETREL	Tokyo Institute of Technology	-
STARS-X	Shizuoka University	-
MAGNARO	Nagoya University	4
MITSUBA	Kyushu Institute of Technology	5
KOSEN-2	National Institute of Technology, Yonago College	4
WASEDA-SAT-ZERO	Waseda University	4
FSI-SAT	Future Science Institute	4

=== Launches and results ===
The Epsilon rocket carrying Innovative Satellite Technology Demonstration-3's RAISE-3 and five CubeSats was launched on 12 October 2022. The launch resulted in failure and all the payloads and the launch vehicle were destroyed.

KOYOH was launched successfully aboard SpaceX Falcon 9 rocket on 1 December 2023.

Following the launch failure of the Epsilon rocket carrying RAISE-3 and the CubeSats selected for Innovative Satellite Technology Demonstration-3, each of the projects were given a re-flight opportunity in subsequent missions, except NEC Space Technologies, Ltd.'s SDRX, which declined the offer.

== Innovative Satellite Technology Demonstration-4 ==
The call for proposals for Innovative Satellite Technology Demonstration-4 was released by JAXA on 17 June 2022, and in September 2022 three CubeSats, KOSEN-3, OrigamiSat-2 and Mono-Nikko were selected.

Project	Agency
LEOMI	Nippon Telegraph and Telephone
GEMINI	Mitsubishi Electric
KIR-X	Pale Blue
TMU-PPT	Advanced Technology Institute
D-SAIL	Axelspace
HELIOS-R	Sakase Adtech Co., Ltd.
CF-CAM	Mach Corporation
AIRIS	Mitsubishi Heavy Industries
MAGNARO-II	Nagoya University
KOSEN-2R	National Institute of Technology, Yonago College
WASEDA-SAT-ZERO-II	Waseda University
OrigamiSat-2	Tokyo Institute of Technology
Mono-Nikko	Di-Nikko Engineering Co., Ltd.
Prelude	Nihon University
ARICA-2	Aoyama Gakuin University

== Innovative Satellite Technology Demonstration-5 ==
Project	Agency
MITSUBA-R	Kyushu Institute of Technology
KOSEN-3	National Institute of Technology, Kagawa College

== See also ==
- MDS-1
- Proba Missions
- Space Test Program
