= RAISE-4 =

- Mission type: Technology demonstration
- Operator: MHI / JAXA
- Website: www.kenkai.jaxa.jp/kakushin/kakushin04.html

Spacecraft properties
- Manufacturer: MHI

Start of mission
- Launch date: 14 December 2025, 03:09 UTC
- Rocket: Electron
- Launch site: Rocket Lab LC-1
- Contractor: Rocket Lab

Orbital parameters
- Reference system: Geocentric

RAISE-4 (RApid Innovative payload demonstration SatellitE-4) is a smallsat for technology demonstration developed by Mitsubishi Heavy Industries (MHI). Part of the Japanese space agency JAXA's Innovative Satellite Technology Demonstration Program, RAISE-4 carries multiple technologies that were selected for in-orbit demonstration. RAISE-4 was launched on a dedicated Electron rocket flight, 'Raise And Shine' in December 2025.

== Overview ==
RAISE-4 is a reflight of the RAISE-3 satellite which was launched by an Epsilon rocket on 12 October 2022 but failed to reach orbit. As with RAISE-3, RAISE-4 was developed by MHI, the prime contractor of Japan's H-IIA and H3 rockets. MHI also previously developed Z-Sat, a satellite launched in 2021 as part of the Innovative Satellite Technology Demonstration-2 mission. RAISE-4 is operated from MHI's Nagoya Guidance & Propulsion Systems Works plant in Komaki, Aichi.

The satellite carries eight of the 16 themes that will be tested in Innovative Satellite Technology Demonstration-4. Among them, five are reflights from RAISE-3, one (KIR-X) has its design modified from RAISE-3, and two (CF-CAM and AIRIS) were newly selected to be flown on RAISE-4.

== Spacecraft ==
As RAISE-4 was deployed into a different orbit than RAISE-3, the thermal design of the satellite was modified.

== Technologies ==
Eight technologies are being tested on board RAISE-4.

- Low Earth orbit satellite MIMO for 920 MHz band IoT platform (LEOMI)
- COTS GPU-based edge-computing for mission systems utilizing model-based systems engineering (GEMINI)
- KIR-X
- Takahashi Denki Seisakusho Pulsed-Plasma Thruster (TDS-PPT)
- Membrane deployment deorbit mechanism (D-SAIL)
- HELIOS-R
- CF-CAM
- Artificial Intelligence Retraining In Space (AIRIS)

=== GEMINI ===
GEMINI, developed by Mitsubishi Electric (MELCO) is a device that includes a commercial off-the-shelf graphics processing unit (COTS GPU). GEMINI has SAR images preinstalled to replicate a typical Earth observation satellite, and the GPU will format and process the image in orbit before sending it to a ground station. The main goal of GEMINI is to test how a consumer-grade GPU performs in space. During development, recently recruited engineers at MELCO were charged with the designing and testing of the device.

=== D-SAIL ===
D-SAIL is a deployable sail that uses its large surface area to generate friction with the atmosphere and decrease the orbital speed of the satellite, which allows it to lower altitude, ultimately leading to the satellite's deorbiting and entering Earth's atmosphere. D-SAIL was developed by Axelspace Corporation.

== See also ==
- MDS-1
