= KSAT =

KSAT may refer to:

- Kongsberg Satellite Services
- Krueger School of Applied Technologies, a magnet program of the Krueger Middle School, San Antonio, Texas, United States
- KSAT (satellite), developed by Kagoshima University, Japan
- KSAT-TV, a television station (channel 12, virtual 12) licensed to San Antonio, Texas, United States
- San Antonio International Airport, Texas, United States (by ICAO airport code)
- K_{sat}, shorthand for saturated hydraulic conductivity
- Korean SAT Test, College Scholastic Ability Test
