= Mitsuba =

Mitsuba may refer to:

== People with the given name ==
- Mitsuba Takanashi (高梨 みつば; born 1975), Japanese manga artist
- Mitsuba Ibaraki (茨木 美都葉; born 1998), Japanese professional footballer

== Other ==
- Mitsuba (satellite), was a nanosatellite
- Mitsuba Corporation, a Japanese corporation
- Cryptotaenia japonica, a species of herbaceous perennial plants also known as Mitsuba
- Mitsuba, free and open-source software rendering system
