= RAISE-2 =

Satellite

- Names: RApid Innovative payload demonstration SatellitE-2
- Mission type: Technology demonstration
- Operator: JAXA
- COSPAR ID: 2021-102A
- SATCAT no.: 49395
- Mission duration: Planned: 12 months Final: 1 year, 4 months, 29 days

Spacecraft properties
- Manufacturer: Mitsubishi Electric
- Launch mass: 110 kg (240 lb)
- Dimensions: 1 × 1 × 0.75 m (3 ft 3 in × 3 ft 3 in × 2 ft 6 in)
- Power: 215 watts

Start of mission
- Launch date: 9 November 2021, 00:55 UTC
- Rocket: Epsilon (No. 5)
- Launch site: Uchinoura Space Center
- Contractor: JAXA
- Entered service: 10 November 2021

End of mission
- Disposal: Decommissioned
- Deactivated: 7 April 2023

Orbital parameters
- Reference system: Geocentric orbit
- Regime: Sun-synchronous orbit
- Perigee altitude: 560 km (350 mi)
- Apogee altitude: 560 km (350 mi)
- Inclination: 97.6°

RAISE-2 (RApid Innovative payload demonstration SatellitE-2) was a smallsat for technology demonstration, part of the Japanese space agency JAXA's Innovative Satellite Technology Demonstration Program. RAISE-2 was launched on 9 November 2021 as the main satellite of Innovative Satellite Technology Demonstration-2. RAISE-2 was developed by Mitsubishi Electric.

RAISE-2 was decommissioned on 7 April 2023.

== Instruments ==
RAISE-2 carried six payloads that were tested in orbit during its one-year mission. The payloads were selected in December 2018.

- SPR was developed by Sony Semiconductor Solutions Corporation
- I-FOG (In-orbit Demonstration of Closed-Loop Fiber Optic Gyro) was developed by Tamagawa Seiki Company
- ASC was developed by Amanogi Corporation
- 3D-ANT, a satellite antenna made by a 3D printer, was developed by Mitsubishi Electric
- ATCD was developed by Tohoku University
- MARIN was developed by JAXA

== See also ==
- MDS-1
