= KOSEN-2 =

Japanese satellite

KOSEN-2 is an educational nanosatellite jointly developed by eight schools of National Institute of Technology in Japan. The satellite would have tested IoT technologies in space. KOSEN-2 was launched on 12 October 2022 by an Epsilon rocket as part of the Innovative Satellite Technology Demonstration-3 mission, but the launch resulted in a failure and the satellite was lost.

== Overview ==
KOSEN-2 was a 2U-size CubeSat developed by eight colleges of National Institute of Technology. After separating from the launch vehicle the satellite would have extended a directional antenna similar to a Yagi antenna. The directional antenna was designed by Kochi College. Kagawa College was in charge of the communication system between the satellite and ground, Gifu College made the satellites's thermal design, Gunma College manufactured its attitude control system, and Tokuyama College manufactured parts using metal 3D printers. The project was led by Masahiro Tokumitsu of Yonago College.

== Mission ==
KOSEN-2 will would have used its accurate attitude control to point its directional antenna towards weather buoys. KOSEN-2 would have then received maritime data from the buoys and collect them.
