= KOSEN-1 =

Japanese demonstration satellite

- Mission type: Technology demonstration
- Operator: Colleges of technology in Japan
- COSPAR ID: 2021-102H
- SATCAT no.: 49402

Spacecraft properties
- Spacecraft type: 2U CubeSat
- Bus: CubeSat
- Manufacturer: National College of Technology, Kochi College
- Launch mass: 2.6 kg (5.7 lb)
- Dimensions: 10 × 10 × 20 cm (3.9 × 3.9 × 7.9 in)

Start of mission
- Launch date: 9 November 2021, 00:55 UTC
- Rocket: Epsilon (No. 5)
- Launch site: Uchinoura Space Center
- Contractor: JAXA

Orbital parameters
- Reference system: Geocentric orbit (planned)
- Regime: Sun-synchronous orbit
- Perigee altitude: 560 km (350 mi)
- Apogee altitude: 560 km (350 mi)
- Inclination: 97.6°

KOSEN-1 is a technology demonstration satellite that will test the deployment of an antenna for observing radio waves emitted from the planet Jupiter. It is a 2U CubeSat, and carries a 7 m (23 ft) antenna. The CubeSat was jointly developed by the National Institute of Technologies in Japan. National Institute of Technologies is known as 'kosen' in Japanese. KOSEN-1 was launched on 9 November 2021 by an Epsilon launch vehicle, as part of the Innovative Satellite Technology Demonstration-2 mission.

== See also ==
- List of CubeSats
