= RAPIS-1 =

Satellite

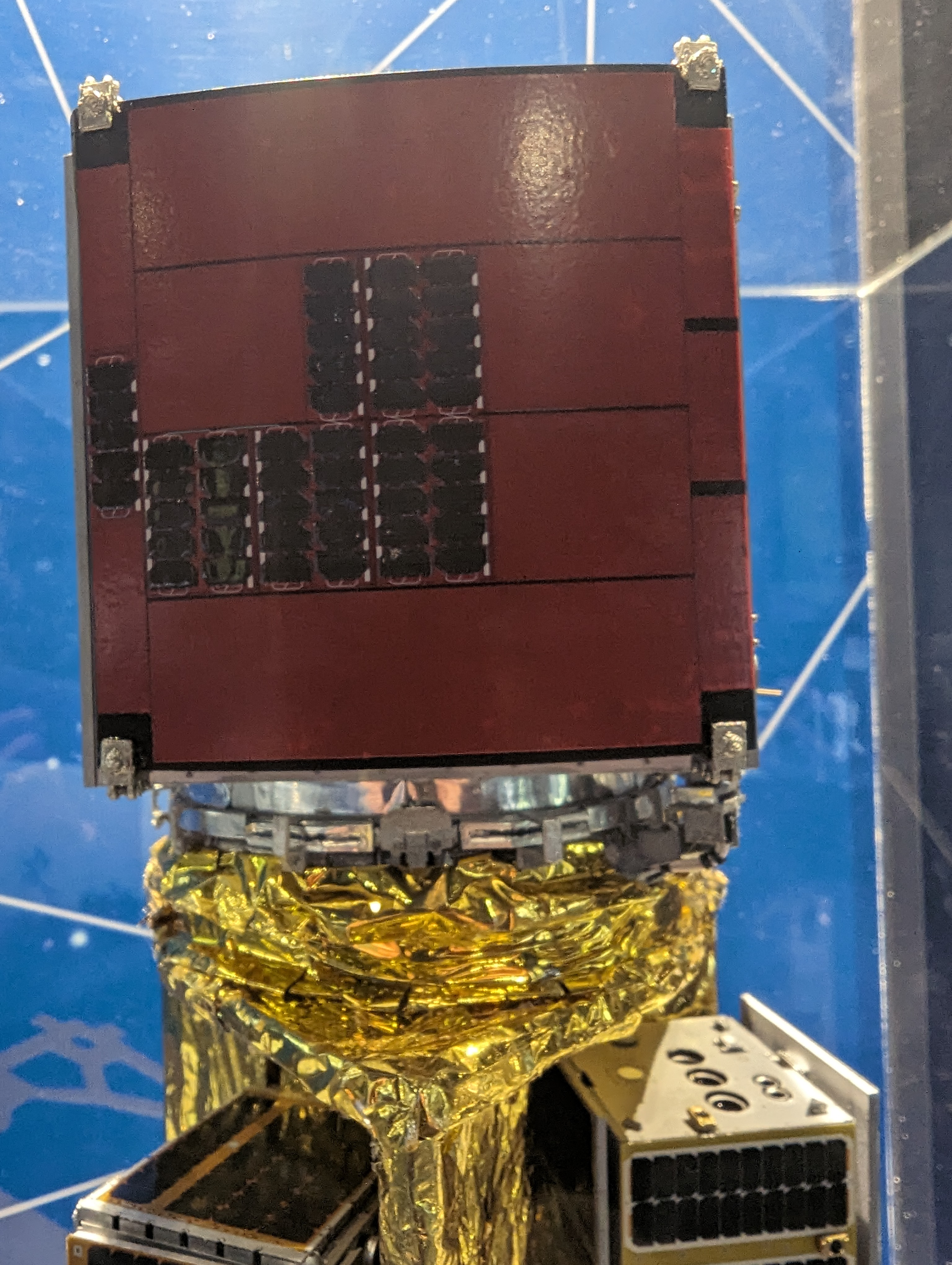
- 1:10 scale model of RAPIS-1 on the upper stage
- Mission type: Technology demonstrator
- Operator: Axelspace / JAXA
- COSPAR ID: 2019-003A
- SATCAT no.: 43932
- Website: www.kenkai.jaxa.jp/kakushin/kakushin01.html

Spacecraft properties
- Manufacturer: Axelspace
- Launch mass: 200.5 kg (442 lb)

Start of mission
- Launch date: 18 January 2019, 00:50:20 UTC
- Rocket: Epsilon
- Launch site: Uchinoura

End of mission
- Deactivated: 23 June 2020
- Decay date: 25 September 2024

Orbital parameters
- Reference system: Geocentric
- Regime: Sun-synchronous

RAPIS-1 (RAPid Innovative payload demonstration Satellite 1) is a satellite launched on 18 January 2019 which for over a year was used to test seven technology demonstration projects. RAPIS-1 was developed and operated by Axelspace Corporation, under the coordination of the Japanese space agency JAXA.

== Overview ==
RAPIS-1 was the main satellite of the Innovative Satellite Technology Demonstration-1 mission. RAPIS-1 demonstrated various projects attached to it as either parts or components. The call for proposals for this mission was announced in 2015, and selection results were announced in February 2016. Of the 13 projects selected for Innovative Satellite Technology Demonstration-1, 7 were on board RAPIS-1. A total of eight projects was initially selected, but a proposal by IHI Corporation, the "Demonstration experiment of a innovative ship information receiving system" was later dropped, making the number of projects sent to space on board RAPIS-1 seven. Along with testing the seven projects, RAPIS-1's satellite system also was tested as part of the overall mission. RAPIS-1 was developed by Axelspace Corporation, a startup company focusing on small satellite development and application, and is the largest satellite to date the company developed. According to reports by Japanese media, RAPIS-1 was the first case for JAXA to contract a private company to manage the entirety of a satellite, from its development to its operation.

RAPIS-1 decayed from orbit on 25 September 2024.

== Payload ==
- The NanoBridge based Field Programmable Gate Array (NBFPGA) is a compact FPGA using atomic switches. NBFPGA was developed by NEC Corporation.
- High data rate X-band Transmitter (HXTX) / X-band Middle Gain Antenna (XMGA) was developed by Keio University.
- The Green Propellant Reaction Control System (GPRCS) is a propulsion system to demonstrate the use of less-toxic fuel. GPRCS was developed by Japan Space Systems, a space agency under the Japanese Ministry of Economy, Trade and Industry. GPRCCS uses SHP163 monopropellant, based on hydroxylammonium nitrate.
- The Space Particle Monitor (SPM) was developed by Japan Space Systems, and is an orbital environment monitor using commercial-off-the-shelf products. Most orbital measuring instruments thus far were designed for large satellites and are bulky and costly, while SPM is small, light, and inexpensive, making it suitable for small satellites to carry. According to Japan Space Systems, by monitoring radiation SPM will help determine the cause of satellite failures.
- The Deep Learning Attitude Sensor (DLAS) is a dual use Earth sensor and star tracker applying deep learning. DLAS uses a camera for mobile phones. Images taken will be analyzed by deep learning, and the results will be sent to ground stations, effectively conducting edge computing in space. DLAS was developed by Tokyo Institute of Technology (TITech), and is aiming for commercialization.
- The Thin Membrane Solar Array Paddle (TMSAP) is a thin-film solar cell that will be unfolded in space. It consists of five panels, each with one-fifths the weight of traditional honeycomb rigid panels. TMSAP was developed by JAXA.
- Fireant (Miniature Spaceborne GNSS Receiver) was developed by Chubu University.

== See also ==
- MDS-1
