= Arase (satellite) =

Japanese Van Allen belt studying satellite

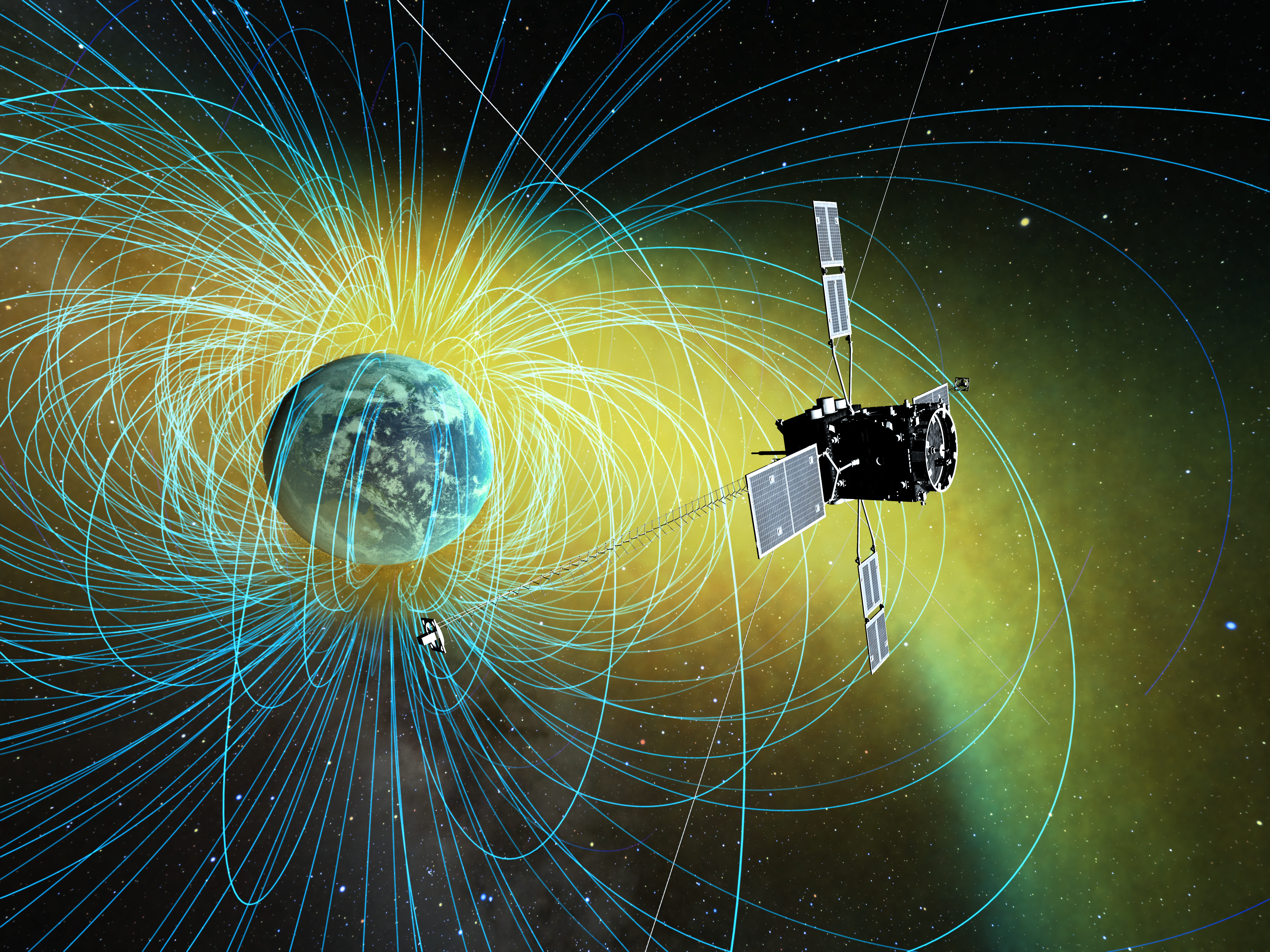
- Artistic rendering of Arase in orbit.
- Mission type: Earth observation
- Operator: JAXA
- COSPAR ID: 2016-080A
- SATCAT no.: 41896
- Mission duration: 8 years, 11 months and 24 days (elapsed)

Spacecraft properties
- Manufacturer: NEC
- Launch mass: ~350 kg
- Power: ≧700 W

Start of mission
- Launch date: 11:00, December 20, 2016 (UTC)
- Rocket: Epsilon
- Launch site: Uchinoura

Orbital parameters
- Reference system: Geocentric
- Perigee altitude: ~460 km
- Apogee altitude: ~32110 km
- Inclination: ~31 degrees
- Period: ~565 minutes

Instruments
- Extremely high-energy electron sensor (XEP-e); High-energy particle sensor – electron (HEP-e); Medium-energy particle sensor – electron (MEP-e); Low-energy particle sensor – electron (LEP-e); Medium-energy particle – ion (MEP-i); Low-energy particle – ion (LEP-i); Magnetic Field Experiment (MGF); Plasma Wave Experiment (PWE); Software Wave-Particle Interaction Analyzer (S-WPIA)

Arase, formerly known as Exploration of energization and Radiation in Geospace (ERG), is a scientific satellite to study the Van Allen belts. It was developed by the Institute of Space and Astronautical Science of JAXA. The satellite was named after the Arase River in Kimotsuki, Kagoshima, where the Uchinoura Space Center is located.

It was launched aboard an Epsilon launch vehicle at 11:00:00, 20 December 2016 UTC into apogee height 32250 km, perigee 214 km orbit. Subsequent perigee-up operation moved its orbit to apogee 32110 km, perigee 460 km of 565 minutes period.

== Spacecraft ==
Arase weighs about 350 kg, measures about 1.5 m × 1.5 m × 2.7 m at launch. Once in orbit, it will extend four solar panels, two 5 m masts, and four 15 m wire antennas. The spacecraft is spin-stabilized at 7.5 rpm (8 seconds).

Planned mission duration was for one year of scientific observation, but the mission remains active over 5 years later.

== Launch ==
Arase's launch on the enhanced Epsilon's maiden flight was originally scheduled for 2015, but was postponed to the 2016 financial year due to satellite development delays.

== Instruments ==
Arase carries following instruments:

- XEP-e (Extremely high-energy electron sensor)
- HEP-e (High-energy particle sensor – electron)
- MEP-e (Medium-energy particle sensor – electron)
- LEP-e (Low-energy particle sensor – electron)
- MEP-i (Medium-energy particle – ion)
- LEP-i (Low-energy particle – ion)
- MGF (Magnetic Field Experiment)
- PWE (Plasma Wave Experiment)
- S-WPIA (Software Wave-Particle Interaction Analyzer)

MGF is located at the end of 5 m extended mast.

PWE consists of a search coil (PWE-MSC) located at the end of another 5 m extended mast, four 15 m wire antennae (PWE-WPT), and associated electronics unit (PWE-E).

S-WPIA will analyse the data obtained by other instruments.

== See also ==
- Akebono
