= RAISE-3 =

RAISE-3 (RApid Innovative payload demonstration SatellitE-3) is a smallsat for technology demonstration developed by Mitsubishi Heavy Industries (MHI). Part of the Japanese space agency JAXA's Innovative Satellite Technology Demonstration Program, RAISE-3 carried multiple technologies that were selected for in-orbit demonstration. RAISE-3 was launched on 12 October 2022 by an Epsilon rocket as the main satellite of Innovative Satellite Technology Demonstration-3, but the launch resulted in a failure and the satellite was lost.

== Overview ==
For developing RAISE-3, JAXA selected MHI, the prime contractor of Japan's H-IIA and H3 rockets. MHI also previously developed Z-Sat, a satellite launched in 2021 as part of the Innovative Satellite Technology Demonstration-2 mission. While in orbit, RAISE-3 would have been operated from MHI's Nagoya Guidance & Propulsion Systems Works plant in Komaki, Aichi. The satellite carried 7 of the 15 themes that will be tested in Innovative Satellite Technology Demonstration-3.

== Technologies ==
Seven technologies would have been tested on board RAISE-3.

- Low Earth Orbit satellite MIMO for 920MHz band IoT platform (LEOMI)
- Software Defined Receiver (SDRX)
- cots GPU based Edge-computing for mission systems utilizing model based systems engineering (GEMINI)
- Kakushin-3 water Ion-thruster and Resistojet-thruster (KIR)
- Tokyo Metropolitan University Pulsed-Plasma Thruster (TMU-PPT)
- Membrane deployment deorbit mechanism (D-SAIL)
- Harvesting Energy with Lightweight Integrated Origami Structure (HELIOS)

=== GEMINI ===
GEMINI, developed by Mitsubishi Electric (MELCO) is a device that includes a commercial off-the-shelf graphics processing unit (COTS GPU). GEMINI has SAR images preinstalled to replicate a typical Earth observation satellite, and the GPU will format and process the image in orbit before sending it to a ground station. The main goal of GEMINI is to test how a consumer-grade GPU performs in space. During development, recently recruited engineers at MELCO were charged with the designing and testing of the device.

=== KIR ===
KIR is a water based hybrid thruster that consists of four resistojet thrusters and a single ion thruster, fed by the same water tank. The resistojet thrusters have a low specific impulse but can produce a large thrust for a short time period. On the other hand, the ion thruster is fuel-efficient but cannot produce a large thrust in a short time period. The two types of thrusters are complimentary, and by combining them KIR can provide a wide variety of thrust capabilities. KIR is sized to fit inside a CubeSat. An external camera monitors the operation of the ion thruster. KIR was developed by Pale Blue, a company that produces a series of thrusters for use in smallsats, all using water as fuel. The company claims that the use of water, instead of toxic alternatives will lead to the sustainable development of space.

=== D-SAIL ===
D-SAIL is a deployable sail that uses its large surface area to generate friction with the atmosphere and decrease the orbital speed of the satellite, which allows it to lower altitude, ultimately leading to the satellite's deorbiting and entering Earth's atmosphere. D-SAIL was developed by Axelspace Corporation.

== See also ==
- MDS-1
