= PETREL =

Japanese technology demonstration satellite

- Names: Platform for Extra and Terrestrial Remote Examination with LCTF
- Operator: Tokyo Institute of Technology

Spacecraft properties
- Manufacturer: Tokyo Institute of Technology

Start of mission
- Launch date: 12 June 2026
- Rocket: H3-30
- Launch site: Tanegashima Space Center
- Contractor: JAXA

Orbital parameters
- Reference system: Geocentric orbit (planned)
- Regime: Low Earth orbit

Instruments
- Multispectral cameras

PETREL (Platform for Extra and Terrestrial Remote Examination with LCTF) is a technology demonstration satellite built by Tokyo Institute of Technology and launched in June 2026. The microsatellite is equipped with a multispectral camera, which will be used to carry out two distinct missions. One mission is to survey the sky in ultraviolet wavelengths for the field of time-domain astronomy, and the other is to conduct spectroscopic observations of the Earth. PETREL is a pathfinder for the ULTRASAT mission.

== Overview ==
PETREL's role differs depending on its position in orbit: while inside Earth's shadow, its mission is to conduct astronomical observations, and while outside, to function as an Earth observation satellite. PETREL is designed to conduct wide field observations in ultraviolet, working in tandem with ground-based observatories to study time-domain multi-messenger astronomy.

As an Earth observation satellite, PETREL is designed to perform multispectral observation of both the land and seas to acquire data for use in agriculture and aquaculture. PETREL's ocean observations are focused on measuring the level of plankton and nutrients in the waters. These data may be used by the aquaculture industry to help ensure a stable amount of catches.

== Launch ==
PETREL was originally planned to be launched on a Epsilon rocket flight in 2022 along with the rest of JAXA's Innovative Satellite Technology Demonstration-3 mission satellites, but was not launched. As of September 2024, PETREL was scheduled to be launched during fiscal year 2025 on the first H3-30 test flight. The launch was later moved to 2026 and the satellite was launched on 12 June 2026.

== See also ==
- HIBARI (satellite) – Japanese microsatellite
- Odin (satellite) – Swedish satellite with radiometer, launched in 2001
