= NanoDragon =

Vietnamese artificial satellite

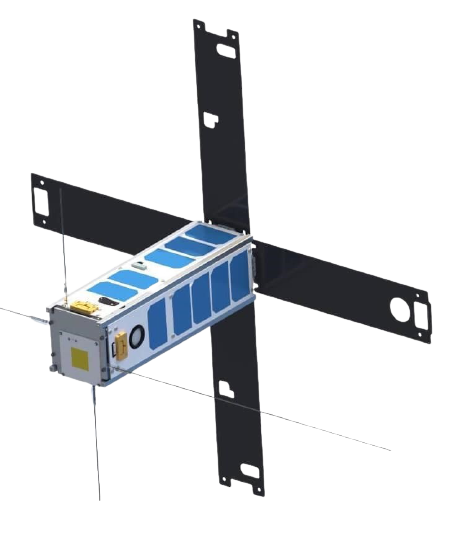
- Mission type: Technology demonstration
- Operator: Vietnam National Space Center
- COSPAR ID: 2021-102D
- SATCAT no.: 49398

Spacecraft properties
- Spacecraft type: 3U CubeSat
- Bus: CubeSat
- Manufacturer: Vietnam National Satellite Center
- Launch mass: 3.8 kg (8.4 lb)
- Dimensions: 10 × 10 × 34.5 cm (3.9 × 3.9 × 13.6 in)

Start of mission
- Launch date: 9 November 2021, 00:55 UTC
- Rocket: Epsilon (No. 5)
- Launch site: Uchinoura Space Center
- Contractor: JAXA

Orbital parameters
- Reference system: Geocentric orbit (planned)
- Regime: Sun-synchronous orbit
- Perigee altitude: 560 km (350 mi)
- Apogee altitude: 560 km (350 mi)
- Inclination: 97.6°

Instruments
- Automatic Identification System (AIS); Optical camera

NanoDragon is a 3U CubeSat built by the Vietnam National Space Center (VNSC).

== Description ==
NanoDragon's weight and dimension are 3.8 kg (8.4 lb) and 10 × 10 × 34.5 cm (3.9 × 3.9 × 13.6 in) respectively. According to Phạm Anh Tuấn, General Director of the Vietnam National Space Center, nearly 20 scientists in the research team designed, integrated, and tested NanoDragon's functions.

It carries an advanced OBC (on board computer) developed by Japan's Meisei Electric.

== Launch ==
Initially, NanoDragon would be launched on 1 October 2021. However, 19 seconds before the first scheduled launch, JAXA made an emergency stop. Later, the launch schedule was rescheduled to 7 October 2021. 25 minutes before the second scheduled launch, the launch was stopped because of wind reason. After these cancellations, JAXA announced that the launch schedule had been postponed to after 25 October 2021.

NanoDragon was successfully launched onboard Epsilon launch vehicle on 9 November 2021 as part of the Innovative Satellite Technology Demonstration-2 mission, along with eight Japanese satellites.

== Activities in orbit ==
NanoDragon would be planned to use its automatic identification system (AIS) receiver to monitor vessels, and would also test the accuracy of its attitude control using an optical imager.

However, after the launch, ground stations were uncontactable with the satellite.

== See also ==
- PicoDragon
- MicroDragon
