= HIBARI (satellite) =

Japanese microsatellite

- Operator: Tokyo Institute of Technology
- COSPAR ID: 2021-102F
- SATCAT no.: 49400

Spacecraft properties
- Manufacturer: Tokyo Institute of Technology
- Launch mass: 55 kg (121 lb)
- Dimensions: 50 × 50 × 50 cm (20 × 20 × 20 in)

Start of mission
- Launch date: 9 November 2021, 00:55 UTC
- Rocket: Epsilon (No. 5)
- Launch site: Uchinoura Space Center
- Contractor: JAXA

Orbital parameters
- Reference system: Geocentric orbit (planned)
- Regime: Sun-synchronous orbit
- Perigee altitude: 560 km (350 mi)
- Apogee altitude: 560 km (350 mi)
- Inclination: 97.6°

Instruments
- Ultraviolet telescope

HIBARI is a space mission by Japan for a microsatellite that would test a new attitude control (orientation) method to achieve high accuracy pointing for its small telescope, and was launched on 9 November 2021 by an Epsilon launch vehicle as part of the Innovative Satellite Technology Demonstration Program-2 mission. The key technology to be tested on HIBARI is called "Variable Shape Attitude Control" (VSAC), and it is based on reaction torque by rotating its four solar array paddles.

== Conceptual design ==
HIBARI is a space mission by the Japanese scientists from the Tokyo Institute of Technology to develop high pointing stability and agile maneuvering of a small satellite by using reaction torque of the satellite's structure. This technology, first presented in 2016, is hoped to substitute the use of reaction wheels and control moment gyroscopes (CMG), which arguably have difficulty achieving both agility and stability simultaneously. This capability would be useful for a very fast response to observe in the direction of gravitational waves or other transient astrophysical phenomena.

The spacecraft is a 55 kg (121 lb) microsatellite configured in a 50 cm (20 in) cube, where half of it would carry a small ultraviolet telescope to verify the pointing stability (< 10 𝑎𝑟𝑐𝑠𝑒𝑐^{2}) and accuracy of the VSAC system. The orientation high accuracy would be achieved by rotating the arms of its four solar arrays in an orthogonal axis. Solar cells would be mounted on both sides of each of four solar array paddles.
