= MAGNARO =

MAGNARO (MAGnetically separating NAno-satellite with Rotation for Orbit control) was a technology demonstration satellite developed by Nagoya University. A nanosatellite built as a 3U-sized CubeSat, MAGNARO consisted of two satellites, MAGNARO-Tigris and MAGNARO-Piscis. MAGNARO aimed to demonstrate formation flight in space without using any thrusters or fuel. The two satellites would have tested the potential of using atmospheric perturbations to keep the distance between each other in orbit. MAGNARO was launched on 12 October 2022 by an Epsilon rocket, but the launch resulted in a failure and the satellite was lost.

== Overview ==
MAGNARO was a 3U Cubesat that could split into two separate spacecraft, the 2U-sized Tigris and the 1-U sized Piscis. Prior to separation Tigris and Piscis are connected by electromagnets. The satellite is also equipped with a telescope.

== Mission ==
MAGNARO would have demonstrated formation flight using atmospheric perturbations. MAGNARO would have been spinning in Earth orbit so that when Tigris and Piscis separates, the two will be far enough from one another. The separation would have taken place in between half a year to one year after launch. After separation, each of the satellites would have used on board magnetorquers for attitude control. By adjusting its face area size, the satellites could have controlled the resistance it receives from faint particles in Earth's atmosphere. The two satellites would have changed the level of air resistance it receives so that they could navigate the distance between them from getting too far or too close.
