= KSAT-2 =

Japanese satellite

- Names: Hayato-2
- Mission type: Technology demonstration Atmospheric research
- Operator: Kagoshima University
- COSPAR ID: 2014-009G
- SATCAT no.: 39578
- Website: leo.sci.kagoshima-u.ac.jp/~n-lab/KSAT-HP/Ksat2_E.html
- Mission duration: 80 days (achieved)

Spacecraft properties
- Spacecraft: CubeSat
- Bus: 1U CubeSat
- Manufacturer: Kagoshima University
- Launch mass: 1.5 kg (3.3 lb)
- Dimensions: 10 cm × 10 cm × 10 cm (3.9 in × 3.9 in × 3.9 in)
- Power: 2 deployable fixed solar panels, solar cells and batteries

Start of mission
- Launch date: 27 February 2014, 18:37 UTC
- Rocket: H-IIA (202)
- Launch site: Tanegashima, Yoshinobu 1
- Contractor: Mitsubishi Heavy Industries

End of mission
- Decay date: 18 May 2014

Orbital parameters
- Reference system: Geocentric orbit
- Regime: Low Earth orbit
- Perigee altitude: 382 km (237 mi)
- Apogee altitude: 389 km (242 mi)
- Inclination: 65.01°
- Period: 92.26 minutes

KSAT-2, also known as Hayato-2, was a Japanese satellite constructed by Kagoshima University as a reflight of its KSAT mission. It has a size of 10 × 10 × 10 cm (without extendible antenna boom) and is built around a standard 1U CubeSat satellite bus. The primary satellite payload is a radio-frequency water vapor detector for climatology research.

== See also ==
- List of CubeSats
- KSAT page (KSAT launched 20 May 2010, contact lost 12 days after launch)
