= WASEDA-SAT-ZERO =

Japanese nanosatellite

WASEDA-SAT-ZERO was a Japanese nanosatellite developed by Waseda University. The satellite did not use screws in its main structure (frame), a feature that was made possible by manufacturing it entirely through 3D printing. WASEDA-SAT-ZERO was launched on 12 October 2022 by an Epsilon rocket, but the launch resulted in a failure and the satellite was lost.

== Overview ==
WASEDA-SAT-ZERO was a 1U-sized CubeSat that was built from a chassis produced by a metal 3D printer, without any screws inside. By eliminating screws, the weight of the satellite can be reduced, and the risk of attached parts coming loose through vibrations can be avoided. Furthermore, by 3D printing a satellite, there will be less time needed to assemble it, and may shorten the satellite's development time. According to Waseda University, this was the first CubeSat in the world to use a chassis manufactured by a metal 3D printer. The inside of the 3D printed frames had a lattice structure to further save weight.

Although WASEDA-SAT-ZERO was the fourth satellite built by Waseda University, it was named 'ZERO' to symbolize the fact that it does not have any screws in its main structure.

== Mission ==
While in orbit, WASEDA-SAT-ZERO would have deployed a plastic membrane. Images would have been displayed on the membrane, and the satellite would have taken measurements of them using an on board camera. The measurements made by the CubeSat would have been analyzed back on Earth.

== See also ==
- WASEDA-SAT2
