= DRUMS =

Japanese experimental satellite

- Names: Debris Removal Unprecedented Micro-Satellite
- Mission type: Technology demonstration
- Operator: Kawasaki Heavy Industries
- COSPAR ID: 2021-102E
- SATCAT no.: 49399

Spacecraft properties
- Manufacturer: Kawasaki Heavy Industries
- Launch mass: 62 kg (137 lb)

Start of mission
- Launch date: 9 November 2021, 00:55 UTC
- Rocket: Epsilon
- Launch site: Uchinoura Space Center
- Contractor: JAXA

Orbital parameters
- Reference system: Geocentric orbit (planned)
- Regime: Sun-synchronous orbit
- Perigee altitude: 560 km (350 mi)
- Apogee altitude: 560 km (350 mi)
- Inclination: 97.6°

DRUMS (Debris Removal Unprecedented Micro-Satellite) is an experimental spacecraft that will test proximity operation near space debris. The microsatellite carries two 'mock space debris' which once deployed will be used as a target for demonstrating approach and contact.

== Overview ==
DRUMS was developed by Japanese company Kawasaki Heavy Industries (KHI), which will also operate the satellite following its launch. DRUMS will be operated from a ground station inside KHI's Gifu Works facility, and an antenna for communicating with the satellite was finished in October 2019. KHI characterizes DRUMS as a demonstration for future missions to remove launch vehicle upper stages from orbit, along with potential applications for on-orbit satellite servicing. DRUMS was launched on 9 November 2021 by an Epsilon launch vehicle. A half size model of DRUMS was displayed at the 2019 G20 Osaka summit.

== Mission ==
Once in orbit, DRUMS will deploy two nonfunctional objects, which will act as targets for DRUMS's space debris approach test. After distancing itself from the target, DRUMS will then begin to approach it using on board optical sensors. The microsatellite has nitrogen gas propulsion for maneuvering, along with lighting it will use to illuminate the target while inside Earth's shadow. Once it has arrived near the target, DRUMS will extend a 2 m (6 ft 7 in) boom, which will be used to physically contact the target. DRUM's camera will record the overall sequence of the test.

== See also ==
- ClearSpace-1
- RemoveDEBRIS
