= ASTERISC =

Nanosatellite

- Names: Advanced Satellite Toward Exploration of dust enviRonment with In-Situ Cosmic dust sensor
- Mission type: Technology demonstration
- Operator: Chiba Institute of Technology
- COSPAR ID: 2021-102C
- SATCAT no.: 49397

Spacecraft properties
- Spacecraft type: 3U CubeSat
- Bus: CubeSat
- Manufacturer: Planetary Exploration Research Center (PERC) at the Chiba Institute of Technology
- Launch mass: 3 kg (6.6 lb)
- Dimensions: 10 × 10 × 30 cm (3.9 × 3.9 × 11.8 in)

Start of mission
- Launch date: 9 November 2021, 00:55 UTC
- Rocket: Epsilon (No. 5)
- Launch site: Uchinoura Space Center
- Contractor: JAXA

Orbital parameters
- Reference system: Geocentric orbit (planned)
- Regime: Sun-synchronous orbit
- Perigee altitude: 560 km (350 mi)
- Apogee altitude: 560 km (350 mi)
- Inclination: 97.6°

Instruments
- Deployable dust sensor Magnetic field sensor Wide-angle camera

ASTERISC (Advanced Satellite Toward Exploration of dust enviRonment with In-Situ Cosmic dust sensor) is a nanosatellite developed by the Planetary Exploration Research Center (PERC) at the Chiba Institute of Technology that will observe cosmic dust in low Earth orbit. It is built as 3U-sized CubeSat and will deploy a large membrane structure in space. ASTERISC was launched on 9 November 2021 by an Epsilon launch vehicle.

== Overview ==
ASTERISC's satellite bus is based on PERC's first CubeSat, S-CUBE, which was operated from 2015 to 2016.

ASTERISC is named after the word asterisk (*), which traces its origin to an ancient Greek word meaning "little star". The satellite will observe space dust, which are tiny fragments of a star. Additionally, the satellite is a CubeSat, figuratively a "little star". The project is led by Ryo Ishimaru of PERC.

== Mission ==
ASTERISC's mission is to investigate small dust particles in space. The particles detected by the satellite are expected to be from two different sources; those of natural origin are cosmic dust, while those of artificial origin are small space debris. Cosmic dust targeted by ASTERISC are particles that are too small to become meteors. Unlike larger dusts, dusts of this size likely do not burn up when they enter in Earth's atmosphere, and some scientist hypothesize that these dusts may be able to bring organic molecules from space.

On the engineering side, ASTERISC will test a new type of film-based dust sensor. The CubeSat's primary instrument is a deployable dust sensor covered in polyimide. When minute particles impact the polyimide film (10 x 30 cm), it will create elastic waves, which will then be measured by numerous piezoelectric devices attached to the polyimide film. ASTERISC will detect particles impacts as electric signals generated by the piezoelectric devices. Since this data will be monitored in real time, it may be possible to investigate the distribution of cosmic dust and minuscule space debris in low Earth orbit.

== See also ==
List of CubeSats
