= Mitsuba (satellite) =

Nanosatellite

Mitsuba was a nanosatellite developed by Kyushu Institute of Technology (Kyutech) which would have tested whether products that are not intended for use in space are still usable for satellites. Mitsuba was launched on 12 October 2022 by an Epsilon rocket, but the launch resulted in a failure and the satellite was lost.

== Overview ==
Mitsuba was a 2U-sized CubeSat developed by students in Kyutech. The satellite's bus system was based on the design that was used for Aoba VELOX-III. The satellite took two years to develop. Mitsuba would have been the second satellite from Kyutech to be launched through the Japanese space agency JAXA's Innovative Satellite Technology Demonstration Program, following Aoba VELOX-IV.

== Mission ==
Mitsuba had two major missions. The first mission was to study how semiconductor parts for use on the ground degrade in space. While most of the semiconductor parts typically used in nanosatellites are commercial off-the-shelf products, such products are not certified for radiation resistance. The semiconductor parts are tested on the ground to see whether it can still function after receiving a absorbed dose of around 100 gray of radiation. If it passes the test, the product will be selected to fly to space. Mitsuba would have validated whether 100 gray is too weak or too strong when compared to the amount of radiation the parts will actually receive in space.

The second mission was to test USB devices in space. A general purpose USB device without space-grade modifications would have been brought to orbit to test whether it functioned properly. Mitsuba carried a USB spectrum analyzer inside, and would have experimented whether the device could measure spectrums while in space as it would on Earth.

== See also ==
- Aoba VELOX-IV
- Birds-1
- Birds-2
- KITSUNE
- LEOPARD
