= AQT-D =

Nanosatellite

AQT-D (Aqua Thruster-Demonstrator) was a nanosatellite project of the University of Tokyo (UT) Space Propulsion Laboratory with the purpose of testing water-fueled propulsion. The satellite was a CubeSat of 3U size; 1U was occupied by the propulsion system, while the remaining 2U was for the spacecraft bus. AQT-D was carried to space inside the pressurized section of Kounotori 8, a Japanese resupply vehicle for the International Space Station (ISS). Kounotori 8 was launched on 24 September 2019. After arriving at the ISS, AQT-D was deployed to space on 20 November 2019 using the JEMRMS robotic arm at the space station's Kibō laboratory module.

The AQT-D project was led by Jun Asakawa of the University of Tokyo.

AQT-D reentered the atmosphere on 20 April 2022.

== Spacecraft ==
AQT-D's spacecraft bus was based on Tasuki (TRICOM-1R), a previous satellite developed by the University of Tokyo and launched in 2017. The satellite was equipped with antennas for store and forward communication.

== Propulsion ==
Water thrusters	Unit/performance
Propellant	Water
Thrust	1 of 4 mN
Specific impulse	>70 seconds
Water mass	< 0.4 kg

AQT-D's propulsion system, called AQUARIUS-1U (Aqua Resistojet Propulsion System-1U), consisted of five water thrusters. A single delta-v thruster produced 4.0 mN, and four reaction control thrusters 1.0 mN, for attitude control. The spacecraft carried less than 0.4 kg of water. The delta-v thruster produced a specific impulse (I_{sp}) of 70 seconds, and a maximum 4.0 mN of thrust, which was dependent on available power. AQUARIUS-1U's design was based on the planned deep space probe EQUULEUS's propulsion system. According to the University of Tokyo, AQT-D was the first ISS-deployed satellite to have water-based propulsion. While satellites deployed from the ISS typically have a short lifetime owing to the station's low altitude, satellites equipped with a propulsion system like AQT-D may potentially remain in orbit for an extended period of time.
