= TeikyoSat-3 =

- Mission type: Technology
- Operator: Teikyo University
- COSPAR ID: 2014-009E
- SATCAT no.: 39576
- Website: www.teikyo-u.ac.jp/affiliate/teikyosat/summary.html

Spacecraft properties
- Manufacturer: Teikyo University
- Launch mass: 20 kilograms (44 lb)

Start of mission
- Launch date: 27 February 2014, 18:37 UTC
- Rocket: H-IIA 202
- Launch site: Tanegashima Yoshinobu 1
- Contractor: Mitsubishi

End of mission
- Decay date: 25 October 2014

Orbital parameters
- Reference system: Geocentric
- Regime: Low Earth
- Perigee altitude: 384 kilometers (239 mi)
- Apogee altitude: 393 kilometers (244 mi)
- Inclination: 65 degrees
- Period: 92.32 minutes
- Epoch: 28 February 2014

TeikyoSat-3 was a Japanese technology-demonstration and microbiology microsatellite developed by Teikyo University. Launched on 27 February 2014 aboard an H-IIA rocket, it carried an experiment to study the formation of slime mold fruiting bodies in microgravity and a high-radiation environment. The satellite also tested a thermal control system designed to maintain a stable temperature in its 20 kg spacecraft bus. It re-entered Earth's atmosphere on 25 October 2014.

== Development ==
The satellite is made at Teikyo University (Japan) and has a size of 320x320x370mm. The microsatellite microbiology experimental platform launched on 27 February 2014 is intended to address issues with cost and uncertain future of experiments based on International Space Station. TeikyoSat-3 also transmit its telemetry uncoded at 473.45 MHz, and any amateur radio operator is welcome to share downlink data.

== Experiment ==
The satellite's biological payload was the cellular slime mold Dictyostelium discoideum, a soil-living amoeba. The experiment was designed to observe the formation of its fruiting body in microgravity and in a high-radiation space environment. The species has a relatively short lifespan, which makes it possible to view all the stages of its life cycle. The payload consisted of a growth system for the slime mold and an observation system that photographed its growth and sent the images to the ground. Two types of specimens were carried so that their behavior in the space environment could be compared. The team also wanted to show that biological experiments could be performed on a small satellite, with the aim of applying the technique to microbial experiments beyond slime mold, for biology and medicine.
