= ITF-1 =

Japanese technology demonstration CubeSat

- Mission type: Amateur radio
- Operator: Tsukuba University
- COSPAR ID: 2014-009B
- SATCAT no.: 39573
- Website: yui.kz.tsukuba.ac.jp

Spacecraft properties
- Spacecraft type: 1U CubeSat
- Manufacturer: Tsukuba University
- Launch mass: 1.3 kilograms (2.9 lb)

Start of mission
- Launch date: 27 February 2014, 18:37 UTC
- Rocket: H-IIA 202
- Launch site: Tanegashima Yoshinobu 1
- Contractor: Mitsubishi

End of mission
- Decay date: 29 June 2014

Orbital parameters
- Reference system: Geocentric
- Regime: Low Earth
- Perigee altitude: 382 kilometres (237 mi)
- Apogee altitude: 391 kilometres (243 mi)
- Inclination: 65 degrees
- Period: 92.28 minutes
- Epoch: 28 February 2014

ITF-1, also known as Yui, was an amateur radio cubesat built by Tsukuba University of Japan. The satellite's primary purpose was the raising awareness of space by providing an easily decoded signal to amateur radio receivers. ITF-1's mission was unsuccessful; no signal from the spacecraft was ever received, and it reentered Earth's atmosphere on 29 June 2014.

== History ==
ITF-1 ("Imagine The Future-1") carried the amateur radio callsign JQ1ZLO and a beacon on 437.525 MHz, a frequency coordinated for it by the International Amateur Radio Union's amateur satellite frequency coordination panel. The beacon was to send telemetry as Morse-code audio tones on an FM transmitter with 300 mW of output power. Telemetry data were first compressed into binary data, cut into 5-bit units and converted into 10–15 Morse code characters. The design was meant to let anyone receive the signal with simple equipment, such as a handheld transceiver or scanner.

ITF-1 was built by students at the University of Tsukuba and flew as a secondary payload with the primary payload of the mission, the NASA–JAXA Global Precipitation Measurement core observatory. It launched at 18:37 UTC on 27 February 2014 on the 23rd H-IIA rocket, which was the first Japanese orbital launch of 2014. The satellite was successfully deployed in orbit, but no signals were ever received from it. Its operation ended when it re-entered the atmosphere on 29 June 2014. The university's YUI project, a small-satellite development effort, had built ITF-1 as its first CubeSat, and the university's authors noted that it had passed its safety review before launch despite the lack of signal.

== See also ==
- List of CubeSats
