= Negai (satellite) =

Japanese satellite

Negai☆″
- Mission type: Technology
- Operator: Soka University
- COSPAR ID: 2010-020C
- SATCAT no.: 36575
- Website: web.archive.org/web/20100308000255/http://kuro.t.soka.ac.jp/cube/what/index.html
- Mission duration: 37 days

Spacecraft properties
- Spacecraft type: 1U CubeSat
- Launch mass: 1 kilogram (2.2 lb)
- Dimensions: 10-centimetre (3.9 in) cube

Start of mission
- Launch date: 20 May 2010, 21:58:22 UTC
- Rocket: H-IIA 202
- Launch site: Tanegashima Yoshinobu 1
- Contractor: Mitsubishi

End of mission
- Decay date: 28 June 2010

Orbital parameters
- Reference system: Geocentric
- Regime: Low Earth
- Perigee altitude: 286 kilometres (178 mi)
- Apogee altitude: 305 kilometres (190 mi)
- Inclination: 29.9 degrees
- Period: 90.42 minutes
- Epoch: 23 May 2010

Negai☆″ ("Wish"), also known as Negai*, was a Japanese satellite which launched in May 2010. It was a student-built spacecraft operated by Soka University and was intended to be a technology demonstration. The satellite was a single unit CubeSat, and was used to test a commercial field programmable gate array in orbit. As part of an outreach programme, it carried the names of selected children involved in the program, along with wishes they have made. The satellite would return images of the Earth, which were given to the participants.

The launch was conducted by Mitsubishi Heavy Industries under contract to the Japan Aerospace Exploration Agency. In preparation for a planned launch on 17 May, the H-IIA rocket was rolled out to Pad 1 of the Yoshinobu Launch Complex at the Tanegashima Space Centre on 16 May 2010. It departed the assembly building at 21:01 UTC and arriving at the launch pad 24 minutes later at 21:25 UTC. The terminal countdown began at 11:30 UTC on 17 May and by 15:28, the loading of cryogenic propellant into the rocket's first and second stages had been completed. The launch attempt was scrubbed a few minutes before liftoff due to bad weather, but took place successfully at 21:58:22 UTC on 20 May 2010.

Negai was deployed from a JAXA Picosatellite Deployer attached to the second stage of the H-IIA 202 rocket used in the launch of the Akatsuki spacecraft towards Venus. Negai shared its dispenser with the K-Sat satellite, whilst a second dispenser contained Waseda-SAT2. The three CubeSats separated into low Earth orbit (LEO) during a coast phase of the launch, between the first and second burns of the second stage. The rocket then continued to Heliocentric orbit, where it deployed Akatsuki, along with the IKAROS and UNITEC-1 spacecraft.

Negai’s orbit decayed on June 28th, 2010.

== See also ==
- List of CubeSats
