= Epsilon (rocket) =

JAXA small-lift rocket family

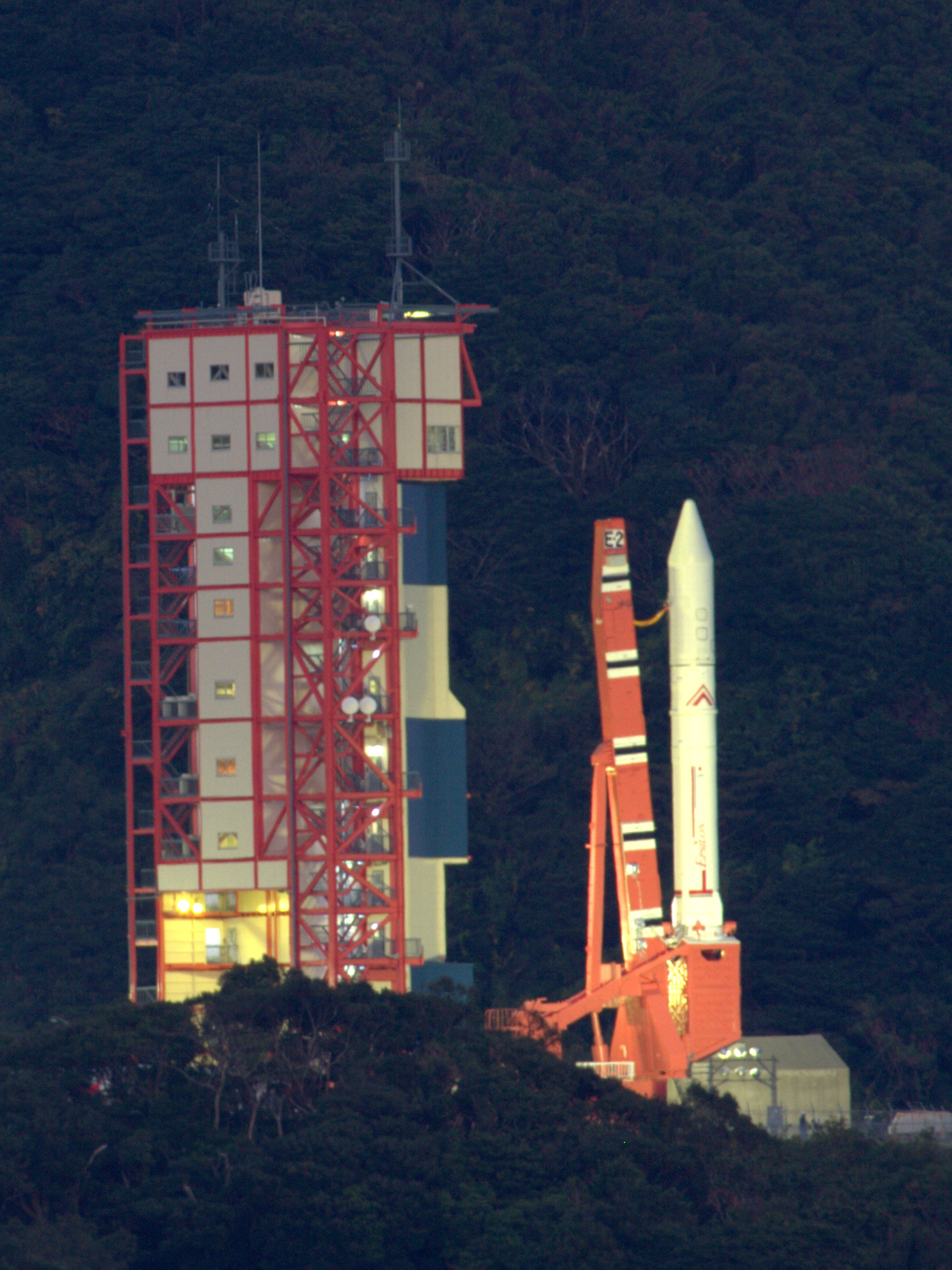
- Epsilon flight F2 before launch in December 2016
- Function: Launch vehicle
- Manufacturer: IHI Corporation
- Country of origin: Japan
- Cost per launch: US$39 million

Size
- Height: 24.4 m (E-X); 26 m (Enhanced); 26.8 m (Epsilon S Block1); 27.2 m (Epsilon S)
- Diameter: 2.5 m
- Mass: 91 t (E-X); 95.4 t (Enhanced); ~100 t (Epsilon S)
- Stages: 3–4

Capacity

Payload to LEO (Epsilon 3 stage)
- Altitude: 250 km × 500 km (160 mi × 310 mi)
- Mass: 1,500 kg (3,300 lb)

Payload to LEO (Epsilon 4 stage)
- Altitude: 500 km (310 mi)
- Mass: 700 kg (1,500 lb)

Payload to SSO (Epsilon 4 stage)
- Altitude: 500 km (310 mi)
- Mass: 590 kg (1,300 lb)

Payload to LEO (Epsilon S)
- Altitude: 500 km (310 mi)
- Mass: 1,400 kg (3,100 lb)

Payload to SSO (Epsilon S)
- Altitude: 700 km (430 mi)
- Mass: 600 kg (1,300 lb)

Associated rockets
- Comparable: Firefly Alpha

Launch history
- Status: Active
- Launch sites: Uchinoura
- Total launches: 6
- Success(es): 5
- Failure: 1
- First flight: 14 September 2013
- Last flight: 12 October 2022

First stage (E-X/Enhanced) – SRB-A3
- Propellant mass: 65.9 t (145,000 lb)
- Maximum thrust: 2,271 kN (511,000 lb_{f})
- Specific impulse: 284 s (2.79 km/s)
- Burn time: 116 seconds

First stage (Epsilon S) – SRB-3
- Propellant mass: 66.8 t (147,000 lb)
- Maximum thrust: 2,158 kN (485,000 lb_{f})
- Specific impulse: 283.6 s (2.781 km/s)
- Burn time: 105 seconds

Second stage (E-X) – M-34c
- Maximum thrust: 371.5 kN (83,500 lb_{f})
- Specific impulse: 300 s (2.9 km/s)
- Burn time: 105 seconds

Second stage (Enhanced/Epsilon S Block 1) – M-35
- Maximum thrust: 445 kN (100,000 lb_{f})
- Specific impulse: 295 s (2.89 km/s)
- Burn time: 129 seconds

Second stage (Epsilon S) – E-21
- Maximum thrust: 610 kN (140,000 lb_{f})
- Specific impulse: 294.5 s (2.888 km/s)
- Burn time: 120 seconds

Third stage (E-X) – KM-V2b
- Maximum thrust: 99.8 kN (22,400 lb_{f})
- Specific impulse: 301 s (2.95 km/s)
- Burn time: 90 seconds

Third stage (Enhanced) – KM-V2c
- Propellant mass: 2.5 t (5,500 lb)
- Maximum thrust: 99.6 kN (22,400 lb_{f})
- Specific impulse: 299 s (2.93 km/s)
- Burn time: 91 seconds

Third stage (Epsilon S) – E-31
- Propellant mass: 5 t (11,000 lb)
- Maximum thrust: 135 kN (30,000 lb_{f})
- Specific impulse: ~295 s (2.89 km/s)
- Burn time: 108 seconds

Fourth stage (Optional) – PBS
- Maximum thrust: 40.8 N (9.2 lb_{f})
- Specific impulse: 215 s (2.11 km/s)
- Burn time: 1,100 seconds (maximum)
- Propellant: Hydrazine

The Epsilon Launch Vehicle, or Epsilon rocket (イプシロンロケット, Ipushiron roketto) (formerly Advanced Solid Rocket), is a Japanese solid-fuel rocket designed to launch scientific satellites. It is a follow-on project to the larger and more expensive M-V rocket which was retired in 2006. The Japan Aerospace Exploration Agency (JAXA) began developing the Epsilon in 2007. It is capable of placing a 590 kg payload into Sun-synchronous orbit.

== Vehicle description ==
=== E-X ===
The development aim is to reduce the US$70 million launch cost of a M-V; the Epsilon costs US$38 million per launch. Development expenditures by JAXA exceeded US$200 million.

To reduce the cost per launch the Epsilon uses the existing SRB-A3, a solid rocket booster on the H-IIA rocket, as its first stage. Existing M-V upper stages will be used for the second and third stages, with an optional fourth stage available for launches to higher orbits. The J-I rocket, which was developed during the 1990s but abandoned after just one launch, used a similar design concept, with an H-II booster and Mu-3S-II upper stages.

The Epsilon is expected to have a shorter launch preparation time than its predecessors; a function called "mobile launch control" greatly shortens the launch preparation time, and needs only eight people at the launch site, compared with 150 people for earlier systems.

The rocket has a mass of 91 t (90 long tons; 100 short tons) and is 24.4 m (80 ft) tall and 2.5 m (8 ft 2 in) in diameter.

=== Enhanced Epsilon ===
After the successful launch of the Epsilon first flight (demonstration flight), the improvement plan was decided to handle the planned payloads (ERG and ASNARO-2).

Requirements for the improvement:

- Apogee ≧ 28700 km (summer launch), ≧ 31100 km (winter launch) of a 365 kg payload
- Sun-synchronous orbit (500 km) of a ≧ 590 kg payload
- Larger fairing

Planned characteristics:

- Height: 26.0 m
- Diameter: 2.5 m
- Mass: 95.1 t (Standard) / 95.4 t (Optional 4th stage (Post Boost Stage))

Catalog performance according to IHI Aerospace:

- Low Earth orbit 250 km × 500 km for 1.5 t
- Sun-synchronous orbit 500 km × 500 km for 0.6 t

Final characteristics:

- Height: 26.0 m
- Diameter: 2.6 m (max), 2.5 m (fairing)
- Mass: 95.4 t (standard) / 95.7 t (optional)

=== Epsilon S Block 1 ===
The Epsilon rocket's first stage has a common design with the SRB-A3, the solid rocket booster of H-IIA/B. As the H-IIA family has retired in 2025, continuing the production of SRB-A3 solely for Epsilon would lead to a significant rise in production cost. Thus a new Epsilon variant, the Epsilon S Block 1 which incorporates commonized parts with the H3, the H-IIA's successor, has been in development. The Epsilon S Block 1's first stage will have a common design with SRB-3, the H3's solid rocket booster.

Major changes from Enhanced Epsilon to Epsilon S Block 1 are:

- The first stage is based on SRB-3, the strap-on solid rocket booster of H3.
- The third stage designated the E-31 is a new design, whereas Enhanced Epsilon's third stage was based on the M-V's third stage. New third stage is three-axis stabilized, whereas Epsilon's third stage was spin-stabilized. Also the third stage is outside the fairing, whereas Enhanced Epsilon's fairing covered the third stage.
- The Epsilon S Block 1's fourth stage, the Post Boost Stage (PBS) is mandatory, whereas Enhanced Epsilon's PBS was optional.
- Epsilon S Block 1's second stage, the M-35a will have the same performance as Enhanced Epsilon's M-35, but with changes in propellant and insulation.

In June 2023, a ground test of the E-31 was conducted at JAXA's Noshiro Rocket Testing Center. Ground testing of the M-35a is scheduled to be conducted in 2026 at the Tanegashima Space Center.

=== Epsilon S ===
In order to further increase the payload capacity of Epsilon, the Epsilon S Block 1's second stage M-35a is planned to be replaced with a larger solid-rocket motor designated E-21.

Initially, the E-21 was to be introduced simultaniously with the SRB-3 first stage and E-31 third stage. However, on 14 July 2023, a test firing of the E-21 failed. The root cause was determined to be the "melting and scattering of a metal part from the ignition device", which damaged the propellant and insulation. Corrective measures were implemented and the rocket motor was tested again on 26 November 26 2024; however, the second test also resulted in a failure 49 seconds after ignition.

In July 2025, NHK reported that JAXA was reviewing its development plans for the Epsilon S. In order to move up plans for a return to flight, the decision was made to defer planned improvements to the second stage and revert to using the proven, existing design of Enhanced Epsilon. While this would entail performance being lower than originally planned, it could enable a launch as early as late 2026.

== Launch statistics ==
=== Launch outcomes ===
- Failure
- Partial failure
- Success
- Planned

== Launch history ==
Epsilon launch vehicles are launched from a pad at the Uchinoura Space Center previously used by Mu rockets. The first flight, carrying the SPRINT-A scientific satellite, lifted off at 05:00 UTC (14:00 JST) on 14 September 2013. The launch was conducted at a cost of US$38 million.

On 27 August 2013, the first planned launch of the launch vehicle had to be aborted 19 seconds before liftoff because of a botched data transmission. A ground-based computer had tried to receive data from the launch vehicle 0.07 seconds before the information was actually transmitted.

The initial version of Epsilon, E-X had a payload capacity to low Earth orbit of up to 500 kilograms, with the Enhanced Epsilon expected to be able to place 1,200 kg (2,600 lb) into a 250 by 500 km (160 by 310 mi) orbit, or 700 kg (1,500 lb) to a circular orbit at 500 km (310 mi) with the aid of a hydrazine fueled stage.

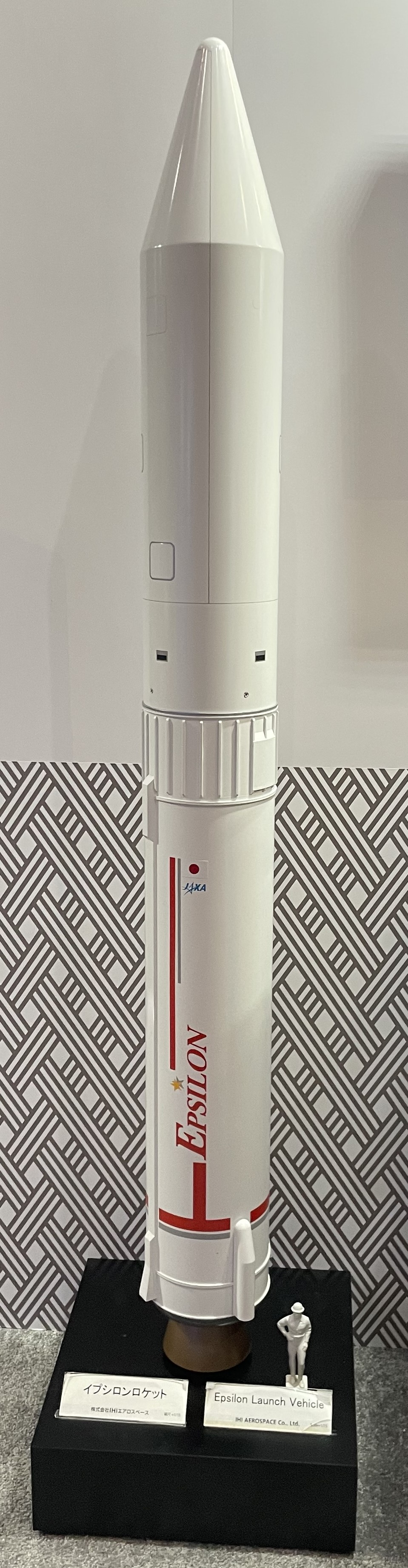
Mockup of Epsilon

Flight No.	Date / time (UTC)	Configuration	Payload	Payload mass	Orbit	Customer	Outcome
1	14 September 2013; 05:00:00	E-X, 4 stage	SPRINT-A (HISAKI)	340 kg	LEO	JAXA	Success
1	Demonstration Flight						
2	20 December 2016; 11:00:00	Enhanced, 3 stage	ERG (ARASE)	350 kg	Geocentric	JAXA	Success
3	17 January 2018; 21:06:11	Enhanced, 4 stage	ASNARO-2	570 kg	SSO	Japan Space Systems	Success
4	18 January 2019; 00:50:20	Enhanced, 4 stage	RAPIS-1; MicroDragon; RISESAT; ALE-1; OrigamiSat-1; AOBA-VELOX-IV; NEXUS	200 kg	SSO	JAXA	Success
4	Innovative Satellite Technology Demonstration-1; component demonstration and technology validation. A new Guidance and Control system was developed for multiple payload deployment capability.						
5	9 November 2021; 00:55:16	Enhanced, 4 stage	RAISE-2; HIBARI; Z-Sat; DRUMS; TeikyoSat-4; ASTERISC; ARICA; NanoDragon; KOSEN-1	110 kg	SSO	JAXA	Success
5	Innovative Satellite Technology Demonstration-2.						
6	12 October 2022; 00:50:00	Enhanced, 4 stage	RAISE-3; QPS-SAR 3 QPS-SAR 4 MAGNARO; MITSUBA; KOSEN-2; WASEDA-SAT-ZERO; FSI-SAT	110 kg	SSO	JAXA, iQPS	Failure
6	RAISE-3 and the six CubeSats were part of Innovative Satellite Technology Demonstration-3. QPS-SAR 3/4 were Epsilon's first commercial satellites launch contracts. Vehicle was destroyed by flight termination system shortly after second stage cutoff due to an attitude control fault. A report regarding the cause has been published and is available for viewing, although it is in Japanese.						

== Planned launches ==
Launch (UTC)	Configuration	Payload	Orbit	Customer
JFY2026	Epsilon S Block 1	Performance evaluation payload	SSO	JAXA
TBD	Epsilon S Block 1	LIDAR Altimeter Satellite	SSO	JAXA
TBD	Epsilon S Block 1	TBD (JAXA-STEPS rideshare)	TBD	JAXA
TBD	Epsilon S Block 1	LOTUSat-1	SSO	VNSC
July 2028	Epsilon S	Solar-C	SSO	JAXA
November 2028	Epsilon S with Kick Stage	OPENS-0	TBD	JAXA
2032	Epsilon S	JASMINE	SSO	JAXA

Sources: Cabinet Office of Japan

== Internet data leak ==
In November 2012, JAXA reported that there had been a possible leak of rocket data due to a computer virus. JAXA had previously been a victim of cyber-attacks, possibly for espionage purposes. Solid-fuel rocket data potentially has military value, and Epsilon is considered as potentially adaptable to an intercontinental ballistic missile. The Japan Aerospace Exploration Agency removed the infected computer from its network, and said its M-V rocket and H-IIA and H-IIB rockets may have been compromised.

== See also ==
- Comparison of orbital launchers families
- Comparison of orbital launch systems
