= Waseda-SAT2 =

Japanese satellite

- Mission type: Technology; Remote sensing
- Operator: Waseda University
- COSPAR ID: 2010-020B
- SATCAT no.: 36574
- Website: www.miyashita.mmech.waseda.ac.jp/Waseda-Sat2/index.htm
- Mission duration: 53 days

Spacecraft properties
- Spacecraft type: 1U CubeSat
- Launch mass: 1.2 kilograms (2.6 lb)
- Dimensions: 10-centimetre (3.9 in) cube

Start of mission
- Launch date: 20 May 2010, 21:58:22 UTC
- Rocket: H-IIA 202
- Launch site: Tanegashima Yoshinobu 1
- Contractor: Mitsubishi

End of mission
- Decay date: 12 July 2010

Orbital parameters
- Reference system: Geocentric
- Regime: Low Earth
- Perigee altitude: 290 kilometres (180 mi)
- Apogee altitude: 303 kilometres (188 mi)
- Inclination: 29.9 degrees
- Period: 90.44 minutes
- Epoch: 23 May 2010

Waseda-SAT2 was a Japanese satellite which launched in May 2010. A student-built spacecraft, it was planned to be operated by Waseda University, intended for Earth observation and technology demonstration. It was planned to test the use of extendible paddles to provide attitude control. The satellite was a single unit CubeSat.

The launch was conducted by Mitsubishi Heavy Industries under contract to the Japan Aerospace Exploration Agency. In preparation for a planned launch on 17 May, the H-IIA rocket was rolled out to Pad 1 of the Yoshinobu Launch Complex at the Tanegashima Space Centre on 16 May 2010. It departed the assembly building at 21:01 UTC, arriving at the launch pad 24 minutes later at 21:25 UTC. The terminal countdown began at 11:30 UTC on 17 May and by 15:28, the loading of cryogenic propellant into the rocket's first and second stages had been completed. The launch attempt was scrubbed a few minutes before liftoff due to bad weather, but took place successfully at 21:58:22 UTC on 20 May 2010.

Waseda was deployed from a JAXA Picosatellite Deployer attached to the second stage of the H-IIA 202 rocket used in the launch of the Akatsuki spacecraft towards Venus. A second dispenser contained K-Sat and the Negai ☆ satellite. The three CubeSats separated into low Earth orbit during a coast phase of the launch, between the first and second burns of the second stage. The rocket then continued to Heliocentric orbit, where it deployed Akatsuki, along with the IKAROS and UNITEC-1 spacecraft.

Contact with the satellite was not established after launch. It re-entered the atmosphere just two months after launch, on the 20 July 2010.

== See also ==
- WASEDA-SAT-ZERO
- List of CubeSats
