= INVADER =

Artificial satellite for artistic experiments in space

- Mission type: Amateur radio Artistic
- Operator: ARTSAT
- COSPAR ID: 2014-009F
- SATCAT no.: 39577
- Website: artsat.jp

Spacecraft properties
- Spacecraft type: 1U CubeSat
- Launch mass: 1.5 kilograms (3.3 lb)

Start of mission
- Launch date: 27 February 2014, 18:37 UTC
- Rocket: H-IIA 202
- Launch site: Tanegashima Yoshinobu 1
- Contractor: Mitsubishi

End of mission
- Decay date: 2 September 2014

Orbital parameters
- Reference system: Geocentric
- Regime: Low Earth
- Perigee altitude: 384 kilometres (239 mi)
- Apogee altitude: 396 kilometres (246 mi)
- Inclination: 65 degrees
- Period: 92.35 minutes
- Epoch: 28 February 2014

The INVADER was a Japanese CubeSat art satellite developed as part of the ARTSAT project by the University of Tokyo and Tama Art University. Described as the world's first CubeSat art satellite. Launched in 27 February 2014, it used an onboard computer to run and reprogram artistic applications in orbit. The project explored the use of satellite-generated data to create interactive media artworks and aimed to promote interest in satellites and amateur radio.

== Design ==
Launched in 27 February 2014, INVADER was described as the world's first CubeSat art satellite. Its aluminum frame housed an Arduino-compatible onboard computer, the "Mission OBC," which made it possible to run and reprogram the satellite's artistic programs while it was in orbit. Data for artworks were distributed through an ARTSAT API from a server at the ground station at Tama Art University, and artists could also use data received directly by radio from the satellite. The project aimed to explore new possibilities in media art by building interactive works from the small amount of data a satellite produces. The first ARTSAT mission was designed to use the satellite's temperature data to control lighting equipment that changes color, to draw more people to satellites and amateur radio.

== Operation ==
INVADER was launched on 28 February 2014 (JST) as a piggyback payload on the H-IIA F23 rocket and entered a non-sun-synchronous orbit at an altitude of 378 km and an inclination of 65°. It was operated by commands sent from the main ground station at Tama Art University. Under the callsign JQ1ZKK, it transmitted a 100 mW Morse-code beacon on 437.325 MHz and, on 437.200 MHz, either 1200 bps AFSK AX.25 packets or FM voice from its Digitalker at 800 mW, using half-wave dipole antennas. The ARTSAT team asked radio amateurs to submit reception reports through an online form.

== See also ==
- List of CubeSats
