= Shin'en (spacecraft) =

Japanese interplanetary spacecraft

- Mission type: Technology
- Operator: UNISEC
- COSPAR ID: 2010-020F
- SATCAT no.: 36578
- Website: UNITEC-1
- Mission duration: 1 day (expected: at least 6–7 months)

Spacecraft properties
- Manufacturer: UNISEC
- Launch mass: 20 kilograms (44 lb)
- Dimensions: 35 cm × 30 cm × 30 cm
- Power: 25 W from Solar cells

Start of mission
- Launch date: 20 May 2010, 21:58:22
- Rocket: H-IIA 202
- Launch site: Tanegashima LA-Y

End of mission
- Last contact: 21 May 2010

Orbital parameters
- Reference system: Heliocentric orbit
- Perihelion altitude: 0.915 AU
- Aphelion altitude: 1.089 AU
- Inclination: 6.8°

Flyby of Venus
- Closest approach: Intended: December 2010
Instruments
- Instrument 1: Geiger counter
- Instrument 2: Mission Camera

Shin'en, known before launch as UNITEC-1 or UNISEC Technology Experiment Carrier 1, is a Japanese student spacecraft which was intended to make a flyby of Venus in order to study the effects of interplanetary spaceflight on spacecraft computers. In doing so, it was intended to become the first student-built spacecraft to operate beyond geocentric orbit. It was operated by University Space Engineering Consortium (UNISEC), a collaboration between several Japanese universities.

It was launched on 20 May 2010 and contact was lost shortly after.

== Spacecraft ==
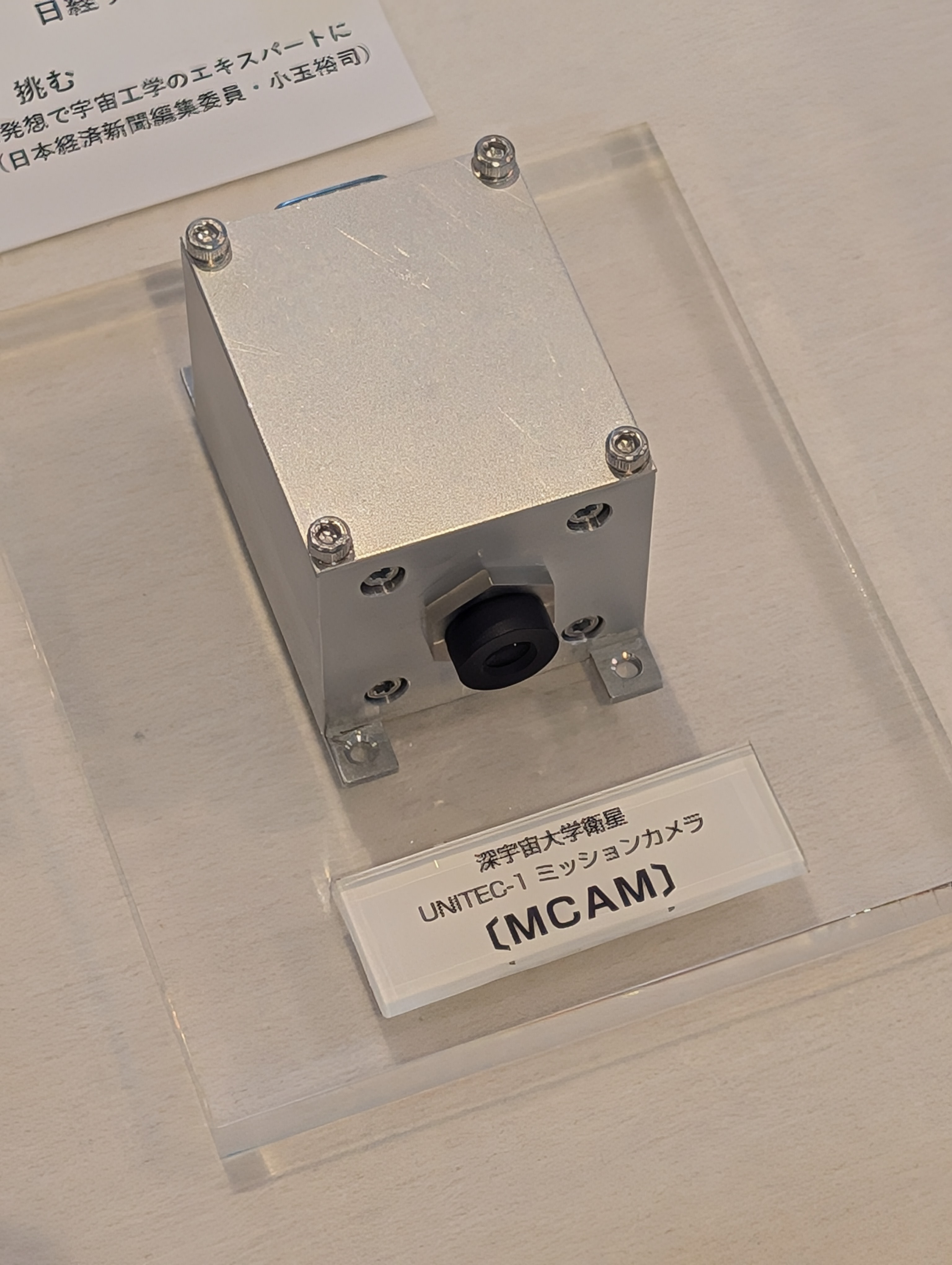
Camera on board UNITEC-1

Shin'en measures 30 by 35 centimetres (12 by 14 in), and has a mass of 20 kilograms (44 lb). It has no attitude control or stabilisation system. Power was to be provided by solar cells attached to the outside of the spacecraft, which were to produce around 25 watts of electricity.

The primary payload of Shin'en consists of six university-built computers, which were to be tested in interplanetary space for robustness against the radiation and extremes of temperature. The spacecraft also carries a camera, and a radiation counter. In order to simplify the system and reduce cost, a low power communications system was used. It was to broadcast a continuous wave with a data transfer rate of one bit per second. UNISEC has invited amateur radio operators to assist in collecting data from the spacecraft.

== Launch ==
Shin'en was successfully launched from Pad 1 of the Yoshinobu Launch Complex at the Tanegashima Space Centre, at 21:58:22 UTC on 20 May 2010. It was being launched as a secondary payload aboard an H-IIA 202 rocket, with the primary payload being the Akatsuki spacecraft bound for Venus. The IKAROS solar sail experiment was also deployed from the same rocket on a trajectory towards Venus. Three other student spacecraft; Waseda-SAT2, K-Sat and Negai ☆ were also launched, however they separated from the rocket whilst it was still orbiting the Earth. Shin'en was the last spacecraft to separate from the rocket. The launch was conducted by Mitsubishi Heavy Industries on behalf of the Japan Aerospace Exploration Agency.

The H-IIA rocket was rolled out to the launch pad on 16 May 2010, departing the assembly building at 21:01 UTC and arriving at the launch pad 24 minutes later at 21:25 UTC, in preparation for a launch scheduled at 21:44:14 UTC on 17 May. The terminal countdown began at 11:30 UTC on 17 May and by 15:28, the loading of cryogenic propellant into the rocket's first and second stages had been completed. This launch attempt was scrubbed a few minutes before the scheduled launch time due to bad weather.

Following launch, Shin'en separated from the carrier rocket into a heliocentric orbit. It was planned to fly past Venus six or seven months into its mission.

Signals from the craft were briefly detected after launch, but contact was then lost. The last signals were received at 15:43 UTC on 21 May 2010, when the spacecraft was 320,000 kilometres (200,000 mi) from Earth. UNISEC explained that Shin'en is the first student spacecraft to pass over the Van Allen radiation belt. Shin'en was expected to be near Venus as of December 2010.

== See also ==
- List of missions to Venus
