= Colleges of technology in Japan =

A "KOSEN (National Institute of Technology, Japan)" is the translated Japanese word used to describe the kōsen educational Japanese college system, a variety of programmes of 5 years of study at a collegiate level. The kōtō-senmon-gakkō (高等専門学校), often abbreviated to "KOSEN" (高専) are attended by students 15 years old or older.

There are 63 kōsen institutions in Japan; most were established by the national government. Most of the institutions are technical schools, each with an enrollment of about 200 students per grade, focusing on engineering and mercantile marine studies.

== Statistics ==
There are a total of 63 colleges of technology in Japan, of which 55 are national, five are public (established by local government) and three are private. Of the 63 institutions, five focus on marine mercantile studies while the rest are engineering schools.

In 2016, there were a total of 57 colleges of technology in Japan, of which 51 were national, three are public and three are private.

Approximately 60,000 students attend the colleges, including roughly 3,000 students in advanced programmes that follow completion of the initial 5-year programme. About 10,000 students graduate annually. The number is approximately 10% of the 4-year university graduates in engineering. Typically, one college has roughly 500–800 students, distributed in several departments.

The 55 national public colleges are united under one governing body, the National Institute of Technology. However, each college have a certain level of autonomy and led by its own president. The official name of each college is "National Institute of Technology, XXXX College", with "XXXX" representing the name of the place where the college is situated.

== Establishment and programmes ==
The colleges of technology were established starting in 1962 to respond to a need for well-trained manpower in the rapidly growing industrial sector. The colleges are distributed throughout Japan and many are in comparatively small population centres. Most of the national colleges were established by 1974 but the Okinawa college was only established in 2002 (accepting its first students in 2004).

Students usually enter the colleges after lower secondary school (grade nine in the North American system or year ten in the British system). Therefore, students follow a 6-3-5 pattern of study (six years of elementary, three years of lower secondary and five years of college) rather than the more typical 6-3-3-4 system more commonly found in Japan. Entrance is by examination though some students may be accepted by recommendation. A few students are accepted after secondary school into the fourth year of the programme. The engineering programmes are 5 years in length while the marine mercantile programmes are 5.5 years duration. At the end of the programme, students are awarded an “Associate” credential.

Within the engineering programmes, students may choose from a variety of sub-areas. These include chemical engineering, biotechnology, electrical and electronic engineering, civil engineering, information systems and control technologies.

While many graduates enter the work force, around 40% go on to further post-secondary education. Graduates of the colleges are in high demand both by companies and by prestigious universities such as the University of Tokyo.

Several colleges of technology have developed their own advanced programmes (専攻科) which are one to two years in length. Upon completion of these programmes, graduates may be awarded degrees by application to the National Institution for Academic Degrees and University Evaluation. Some colleges, such as the Wakayama College, received special permit from the Ministry of Education, Culture, Science, and Technology of Japan, to confer a BS in Engineering degree at the end of the advanced programme, and thus graduates do not have to apply to the National Institution for Academic Degrees and University Evaluation in order to receive their bachelor's degree.

In 2002, the Committee on the Future of National Colleges of Technology was established. Following the Committee's 2003 final report, a Law concerning the Institute of National Colleges of Technology, Japan was enacted with the Institute coming into operation in 2004.

== See also ==
- Higher education in Japan
- Institute of technology
- Technical education in Japan
