= Hayato (satellite) =

Japanese satellite launched in 2010

- Names: KSAT; Kagoshima Satellite
- Mission type: Technology demonstration Atmospheric research
- Operator: Kagoshima University
- COSPAR ID: 2010-020A
- SATCAT no.: 36573
- Mission duration: 55 days (achieved)

Spacecraft properties
- Spacecraft: CubeSat
- Bus: 1U CubeSat
- Manufacturer: Kagoshima University
- Launch mass: 1.43 kg (3.2 lb)
- Dimensions: 10 cm × 10 cm × 10 cm (3.9 in × 3.9 in × 3.9 in)
- Power: 2 deployable fixed solar panels, solar cells and batteries

Start of mission
- Launch date: 20 May 2010, 21:58:22 UTC
- Rocket: H-IIA (202) (# 17)
- Launch site: Tanegashima, Yoshinobu 1
- Contractor: Mitsubishi Heavy Industries

End of mission
- Last contact: 1 June 2010
- Decay date: 14 July 2010

Orbital parameters
- Reference system: Geocentric orbit
- Regime: Low Earth orbit
- Perigee altitude: 299.1 km (185.9 mi)
- Apogee altitude: 299.6 km (186.2 mi)
- Inclination: 30.0°
- Period: 90.5 minutes

Hayato, known before launch as KSAT, or the Kagoshima Satellite, is a Japanese satellite which was launched on 20 May 2010. It is a student-built spacecraft, which is operated by Kagoshima University, and is being used for technology demonstration and atmospheric research. The satellite is a single unit CubeSat, and carries equipment to study water vapour in the Earth's atmosphere, microwave imagery and spacecraft communication.

== Launch ==
The launch was conducted by Mitsubishi Heavy Industries under contract to the Japan Aerospace Exploration Agency (JAXA). In preparation for a planned launch on 17 May 2010, the H-IIA launch vehicle was rolled out to Pad 1 of the Yoshinobu Launch Complex at the Tanegashima Space Center on 16 May 2010. It departed the assembly building at 21:01 UTC and arriving at the launch pad 24 minutes later at 21:25 UTC. The terminal countdown began at 11:30 UTC on 17 May 2010 and by 15:28 UTC, the loading of cryogenic propellant into the rocket's first and second stages had been completed. The launch attempt was scrubbed a few minutes before liftoff due to bad weather, but took place successfully at 21:58:22 UTC on 20 May 2010.

== Mission ==
Hayato was deployed from a JAXA Picosatellite Deployer attached to the second stage of the H-IIA launch vehicle used in the launch of the Akatsuki spacecraft towards Venus. KSAT shared its dispenser with the Negai satellite, whilst a second dispenser contained Waseda-SAT2. The three CubeSats separated into low Earth orbit during a coast phase of the launch, between the first and second burns of the second stage. The launch vehicle then continued to heliocentric orbit, where it deployed Akatsuki, along with the IKAROS and UNITEC-1 spacecraft. Contact with the satellite was established for 12 days only.

== See also ==
- List of CubeSats
