= MDS-1 =

Japanese technology demonstration satellite

Mission Demonstration Satellite 1 (MDS-1) or Tsubasa (COSPAR 2002-003A, SATCAT 27367) was a Japanese technology test mission. It was launched by the second H-2A on February 4, 2002 from the Tanegashima Space Center. After the launch, MDS-1 was renamed Tsubasa, meaning wings in Japanese. Tsubasa was placed in a geostationary transfer orbit (GTO). It ended its operational phase on 26 February 2003. A similar mission, MDS-2, was cancelled.

The purpose of the mission was to test the performance of commercial off-the-shelf components, including solar batteries, semiconductors and computers. MDS-1 also carried instrumentation to observe how changes in the environment as the satellite passed through the Van Allen radiation belts affected the performance of each component. Among these instruments were a dosimeter using radiation-sensitive field effect transistors, a magnetometer, and a device for tracking heavy ions. During the mission, MDS-1 tracked the occurrence of single event upsets (SEU), finding the majority occurred while passing the inner belt during solar maximum and were likely caused by high energy protons. The whole weight of the satellite was 480 kg.
