= List of H-II series launches =

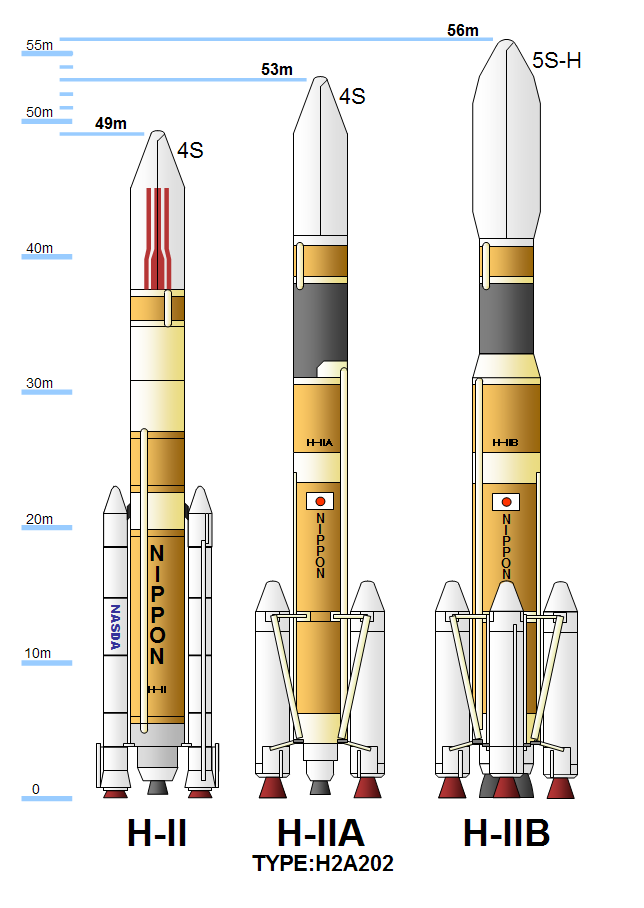
Comparison of H-II series of rockets. From left: H‑II, H‑IIA 202, and H‑IIB

This is a list of launches made by JAXA using H-II series of rockets which also includes the H-IIA and H-IIB. The H-II series was Japan's first medium-lift, liquid-propellant rockets produced using only technologies developed domestically.

== Launch statistics ==
=== Rocket configurations ===
- H-II
- H-IIA
- H-IIB

=== Launch sites ===
- LA-Y1
- LA-Y2

=== Launch outcomes ===
- Success
- Partial failure
- Failure
- Planned

== Launch history ==
=== 1994-1999 ===
Flight	Launch (UTC)	Version	Launch site	Payload(s)	Payload mass	Orbit	Customer	Outcome
TF1	3 February 1994; 22:20	H-II	Tanegashima, LA-Y1	VEP-1 / OREX		LEO / GTO		Success
TF1	Carried Vehicle Evaluation Payload 1 (VEP-1), a mass simulator nicknamed Myōjō and the Orbital Re-Entry EXperiment (OREX), nicknamed Ryūse.							
TF2	28 August 1994; 07:50	H-II	Tanegashima, LA-Y1	ETS-VI		GEO		Success
TF2	Carried Engineering Test Satellite-VI (ETS-VI), nicknamed Kiku 6.							
TF3	18 March 1995; 08:01	H-II	Tanegashima, LA-Y1	Geostationary Meteorological Satellite-5 (GMS-5) / Space Flyer Unit (SFU)		GEO / LEO		Success
TF3	Himawari 5							
F4	17 August 1996; 01:53	H-II	Tanegashima, LA-Y1	ADEOS I (Advanced Earth Observing Satellite) / Fuji-OSCAR 29, JAS-2		LEO		Success
F4	Midori and Fuji 3							
F6	27 November 1997; 21:27	H-II	Tanegashima, LA-Y1	TRMM (Tropical Rainfall Measuring Mission) / ETS-VII (Engineering Test Satellite-VII)		LEO		Success
F6	Orihime and Kiku 7 (Hikoboshi)							
F5	21 February 1998; 07:55	H-II	Tanegashima, LA-Y1	COMETS (Communications and Broadcasting Engineering Test Satellites)		GEO		Partial failure
F5	Kakehashi, Faulty brazing in second-stage engine cooling system caused engine burn through and cable damage resulting in shutdown midway through the upper stage's second burn, leaving spacecraft in elliptical LEO instead of GTO. Spacecraft thrusters raised orbit enough to complete some communications experiments.							
F8	15 November 1999; 07:29	H-II	Tanegashima, LA-Y1	MTSAT (Multi-functional Transport Satellite)		GEO		Failure
F8	Cavitation in the first stage hydrogen turbopump impeller caused an impeller blade to fracture, resulting in loss of fuel and rapid shutdown of the engine at T+239 seconds. The vehicle impacted the ocean 380 km at the northwest of Chichijima.							
=== 2001–2003 ===
Flight	Launch (UTC)	Version	Launch site	Payload(s)	Payload mass	Orbit	Customer	Outcome
TF1	29 August 2001; 07:00:00	H-IIA 202	Tanegashima, LA-Y1	VEP-2 (mass simulator)				Success
TF1	Vehicle Evaluation Payload 2 / LRE							
TF2	4 February 2002; 02:45:00	H-IIA 2024	Tanegashima, LA-Y1	VEP-3 (mass simulator) / MDS-1				Success
TF2	Vehicle Evaluation Payload 3 / Mission Demonstration Satellite 1 (Tsubasa) / DASH							
F3	10 September 2002; 08:20:00	H-IIA 2024	Tanegashima, LA-Y1	USERS / DRTS (Kodama)				Success
F4	14 December 2002; 01:31:00	H-IIA 202	Tanegashima, LA-Y1	ADEOS II (Midori 2) / WEOS (Kanta-kun) / FedSat 1 / Micro LabSat 1				Success
F5	28 March 2003; 01:27:00	H-IIA 2024	Tanegashima, LA-Y1	IGS-Optical 1 / IGS-Radar 1				Success
F6	29 November 2003; 04:33:00	H-IIA 2024	Tanegashima, LA-Y1	IGS-Optical 2 / IGS-Radar 2				Failure
F6	A hot gas leak from one SRB-A motor destroyed its separation system. The strap-on did not separate as planned, and the weight of the spent motor prevented the vehicle from achieving its planned height.							
=== 2005–2009 ===
Flight	Launch (UTC)	Version	Launch site	Payload(s)	Payload mass	Orbit	Customer	Outcome
F7	26 February 2005; 09:25:00	H-IIA 2022	Tanegashima, LA-Y1	MTSAT-1R (Himawari 6)				Success
F8	24 January 2006; 01:33:00	H-IIA 2022	Tanegashima, LA-Y1	ALOS (Daichi)				Success
F9	18 February 2006; 06:27:00	H-IIA 2024	Tanegashima, LA-Y1	MTSAT-2 (Himawari 7)				Success
F10	11 September 2006; 04:35:00	H-IIA 202	Tanegashima, LA-Y1	IGS-Optical 2				Success
F11	18 December 2006; 06:32:00	H-IIA 204	Tanegashima, LA-Y1	ETS-VIII (Kiku 8)		GTO		Success
F12	24 February 2007; 04:41:00	H-IIA 2024	Tanegashima, LA-Y1	IGS-Radar 2 / IGS-Optical 3V				Success
F13	14 September 2007; 01:31:01	H-IIA 2022	Tanegashima, LA-Y1	SELENE (Kaguya)				Success
F14	23 February 2008; 08:55:00	H-IIA 2024	Tanegashima, LA-Y1	WINDS (Kizuna)				Success
F15	23 January 2009; 03:54:00	H-IIA 202	Tanegashima, LA-Y1	GOSAT (Ibuki) / SDS-1 / STARS (Space Tethered Autonomous Robotic Satellite) (Kūkai) / KKS-1 (Kiseki) / PRISM (Hitomi) / Sohla-1 (Maido 1) / SORUNSAT-1 (Kagayaki) / SPRITE-SAT (Raijin)				Success
F1	10 September 2009; 17:01:46	H-IIB	Tanegashima, LA-Y2	HTV-1				Success
F1	First flight of H-IIB							
F16	28 November 2009; 01:21:00	H-IIA 202	Tanegashima, LA-Y1	IGS-Optical 3				Success
=== 2010–2014 ===
Flight	Launch (UTC)	Version	Launch site	Payload(s)	Payload mass	Orbit	Customer	Outcome
F17	20 May 2010; 21:58:22	H-IIA 202	Tanegashima, LA-Y1	PLANET-C (Akatsuki) / IKAROS / UNITEC-1 (Shin'en) / Waseda-SAT2 / K-Sat (Hayato) / Negai☆″				Success
F18	11 September 2010; 11:17:00	H-IIA 202	Tanegashima, LA-Y1	QZS-1 (Michibiki)				Success
F2	22 January 2011; 05:37:57	H-IIB	Tanegashima, LA-Y2	Kounotori 2 (HTV-2)				Success
F19	23 September 2011; 04:36:50	H-IIA 202	Tanegashima, LA-Y1	IGS-Optical 4				Success
F20	12 December 2011; 01:21:00	H-IIA 202	Tanegashima, LA-Y1	IGS-Radar 3				Success
F21	17 May 2012; 16:39:00	H-IIA 202	Tanegashima, LA-Y1	GCOM-W1 (Shizuku) / KOMPSAT-3 (Arirang 3) / SDS-4 / HORYU-2				Success
F3	21 July 2012; 02:06:18	H-IIB	Tanegashima, LA-Y2	Kounotori 3 (HTV-3) / Raiko / We Wish / Niwaka / TechEdSat / F-1				Success
F3	CubeSats carried aboard Kounotori 3, deployed on 4 October 2012 from the ISS.							
F22	27 January 2013; 04:40:00	H-IIA 202	Tanegashima, LA-Y1	IGS-Radar 4 / IGS-Optical 5V				Success
F4	3 August 2013; 19:48:46	H-IIB	Tanegashima, LA-Y2	Kounotori 4 (HTV-4) / PicoDragon / ArduSat-1 / ArduSat-X / TechEdSat-3				Success
F4	CubeSats carried aboard Kounotori 4 for deployment from the ISS.							
F23	27 February 2014; 18:37:00	H-IIA 202	Tanegashima, LA-Y1	GPM-Core / SindaiSat (Ginrei) / STARS-II (Gennai) / TeikyoSat-3 / ITF-1 (Yui) / OPUSAT (CosMoz) / INVADER / KSAT2				Success
F24	24 May 2014; 03:05:14	H-IIA 202	Tanegashima, LA-Y1	ALOS-2 (Daichi 2) / Raijin-2 (Rising-2) / UNIFORM-1 / SOCRATES / SPROUT				Success
F25	7 October 2014; 05:16:00	H-IIA 202	Tanegashima, LA-Y1	Himawari 8				Success
F26	3 December 2014; 04:22:04	H-IIA 202	Tanegashima, LA-Y1	Hayabusa 2 / Shin'en 2 / ARTSAT2-DESPATCH / PROCYON				Success
=== 2015–2019 ===
Flight	Launch (UTC)	Version	Launch site	Payload(s)	Payload mass	Orbit	Customer	Outcome
F27	1 February 2015; 01:21:00	H-IIA 202	Tanegashima, LA-Y1	IGS-Radar Spare				Success
F28	26 March 2015; 01:21:00	H-IIA 202	Tanegashima, LA-Y1	IGS-Optical 5				Success
F5	19 August 2015; 11:50:49	H-IIB	Tanegashima, LA-Y2	Kounotori 5 (HTV-5) / SERPENS / S-CUBE / Flock-2b x 14 / GOMX-3 / AAUSAT5		LEO (ISS)		Success
F5	CubeSats carried aboard Kounotori 5 for deployment from the ISS.							
F29	24 November 2015; 06:50:00	H-IIA 204	Tanegashima, LA-Y1	Telstar 12 Vantage		GTO		Success
F30	17 February 2016; 08:45:00	H-IIA 202	Tanegashima, LA-Y1	ASTRO-H (Hitomi) / ChubuSat-2 (Kinshachi 2) / ChubuSat-3 (Kinshachi 3) / Horyu-4				Success
F30	The Hitomi telescope broke apart 37 days after launch.							
F31	2 November 2016; 06:20:00	H-IIA 202	Tanegashima, LA-Y1	Himawari 9				Success
F6	9 December 2016; 13:26:47	H-IIB	Tanegashima, LA-Y2	Kounotori 6 (HTV-6) / AOBA-Velox III / TuPOD / EGG / ITF-2 / STARS-C / FREEDOM / WASEDA-SAT3		LEO (ISS)		Success
F6	CubeSats carried aboard Kounotori 6 for deployment from the ISS.							
F32	24 January 2017; 07:44:00	H-IIA 204	Tanegashima, LA-Y1	DSN-2 (Kirameki 2)		GTO		Success
F33	17 March 2017; 01:20:00	H-IIA 202	Tanegashima, LA-Y1	IGS-Radar 5				Success
F34	1 June 2017; 00:17:46	H-IIA 202	Tanegashima, LA-Y1	QZS-2 (Michibiki 2)				Success
F35	19 August 2017; 05:29:00	H-IIA 204	Tanegashima, LA-Y1	QZS-3 (Michibiki 3)		GTO		Success
F36	9 October 2017; 22:01:37	H-IIA 202	Tanegashima, LA-Y1	QZS-4 (Michibiki 4)				Success
F37	23 December 2017; 01:26:22	H-IIA 202	Tanegashima, LA-Y1	GCOM-C (Shikisai) / SLATS (Tsubame)				Success
F38	27 February 2018; 04:34:00	H-IIA 202	Tanegashima, LA-Y1	IGS-Optical 6				Success
F39	12 June 2018; 04:20:00	H-IIA 202	Tanegashima, LA-Y1	IGS-Radar 6				Success
F7	22 September 2018; 17:52:27	H-IIB	Tanegashima, LA-Y2	Kounotori 7 (HTV-7) / SPATIUM-I / RSP-00 / STARS-Me		LEO (ISS)		Success
F7	CubeSats carried aboard Kounotori 7 for deployment from the ISS.							
F40	29 October 2018; 04:08:00	H-IIA 202	Tanegashima, LA-Y1	GOSAT-2 (Ibuki-2) / KhalifaSat / Ten-Koh / Diwata-2B / Stars-AO (Aoi) / AUTcube2 (GamaCube)				Success
F8	24 September 2019; 16:05:05	H-IIB	Tanegashima, LA-Y2	Kounotori 8 (HTV-8) / NARSSCube-1 / AQT-D / RWASAT-1		LEO (ISS)		Success
F8	CubeSats carried aboard of Kounotori 8 for deployment from the ISS.							
=== 2020–2025 ===
Flight	Launch (UTC)	Version	Launch site	Payload(s)	Payload mass	Orbit	Customer	Outcome
F41	9 February 2020; 01:34:00	H-IIA 202	Tanegashima, LA-Y1	IGS-Optical 7				Success
F9	20 May 2020; 17:31:00	H-IIB	Tanegashima, LA-Y2	Kounotori 9 (HTV-9)		LEO (ISS)		Success
F9	Kounotori 9 launch to the ISS. The last launch of both the launch vehicle and vehicle, awaiting new fleet of HTV-X and H3.							
F42	19 July 2020; 21:58:14	H-IIA 202	Tanegashima, LA-Y1	Emirates Mars Mission	1350 kg	Heliocentric	Mohammed bin Rashid Space Centre	Success
F42	Emirates Mars Mission launched to planet Mars.							
F43	29 November 2020; 07:25:00	H-IIA 202	Tanegashima, LA-Y1	JDRS/LUCAS		GTO		Success
F44	26 October 2021; 02:19:37	H-IIA 202	Tanegashima, LA-Y1	QZS-1R	about 4t	IGSO	Cabinet Office	Success
F44	Replacement for QZS-1 (Michibiki-1).							
F45	22 December 2021; 15:32:00	H-IIA 204	Tanegashima, LA-Y1	Inmarsat-6 F1	5,470 kg	GTO (supersynchronous)	Inmarsat	Success
F45	Final flight of H-IIA 204.							
F46	26 January 2023; 01:50:21	H-IIA 202	Tanegashima, LA-Y1	IGS-Radar 7		SSO	CIRO	Success
F47	6 September 2023; 23:42:11	H-IIA 202	Tanegashima, LA-Y1	XRISM / SLIM	3,015 kg	LEO / Selenocentric	JAXA / NASA	Success
F48	12 January 2024; 04:44:26	H-IIA 202	Tanegashima, LA-Y1	IGS-Optical 8		SSO	CIRO	Success
F49	26 September 2024; 05:24:20	H-IIA 202	Tanegashima, LA-Y1	IGS-Radar 8		SSO	CIRO	Success
F50	28 June 2025; 16:33	H-IIA 202	Tanegashima, LA-Y1	GOSAT-GW	2,600 kg	SSO	JAXA	Success
F50	Final flight of H-IIA 202, and H-II family as a whole.							
