= DS2000 =

Geostationary communications satellite bus

- Manufacturer: MELCO
- Country of origin: Japan
- Applications: Communications

Specifications
- Spacecraft type: Geostationary Communications satellite
- Launch mass: 3 t (3.3 tons) to 5 t (5.5 tons)
- Power: Up to 15 kW
- Batteries: Li-ion
- Regime: Geostationary
- Design life: At least 15 years

Production
- Status: In production
- On order: 16
- Built: 16
- Launched: 16
- Maiden launch: DRTS (Kodama), September 10, 2002
- Last launch: Es'hail 2, November 15, 2018

The DS2000 is a geostationary communications satellite bus designed and manufactured by Mitsubishi Electric of Japan. Designed to carry payloads between 3 t (3.3 tons) and 5 t (5.5 tons), with power requirements of up to 15 kW. It is compatible with Ariane 5, Proton-M, Zenit-3SL, Atlas V, Falcon 9 and H-IIA.

According to Moog-ISP, the DS2000 platform uses its bipropellant thrusters.

== List of satellites ==
Satellites using the DS2000 platform.

Satellite	Order	Launch	Launch vehicle	Launch mass	Launch result
DRTS (Kodama)	—N/a	2002-09-10	H2A 2024	2,800 kg (6,200 lb)	Success
ETS-VIII (Kiku 8)	—N/a	2006-12-18	H2A 204	5,800 kg (12,800 lb)	Success
MTSAT-2 (Himawari 7)	2000	2006-02-18	H2A 2024	4,650 kg (10,250 lb)	Success
Superbird-7 (Superbird-C2)	2005	2008-08-14	Ariane 5 ECA	4,820 kg (10,630 lb)	Success
QZS-1 (Michibiki 1)	—N/a	2010-09-11	H2A 202	4,100 kg (9,000 lb)	Success
ST-2	2008	2011-05-20	Ariane 5 ECA	5,090 kg (11,220 lb)	Success
Himawari 8	2009	2014-10-07	H2A 202	3,500 kg (7,700 lb)	Success
Türksat 4A	2011	2014-02-14	Proton-M/Briz-M	4,850 kg (10,690 lb)	Success
Türksat 4B	2011	2015-10-16	Proton-M/Briz-M	4,924 kg (10,856 lb)	Success
Himawari 9	2009	2016-11-02	H2A 202	3,500 kg (7,700 lb)	Success
DSN-2 (Kirameki 2)		2017-01-24	H2A 204		Success
QZS-2 (Michibiki 2)	2013	2017-06-01	H2A 202	4,100 kg (9,000 lb)	Success
QZS-3 (Michibiki 3)	2013	2017-08-19	H2A 204	4,100 kg (9,000 lb)	Success
QZS-4 (Michibiki 4)	2013	2017-10-09	H2A 202	4,100 kg (9,000 lb)	Success
Superbird-8 / DSN-1 (Kirameki 1)	2014	2018-04-05	Ariane 5 ECA		Success
Es'hail 2	2014	2018-11-15	Falcon 9 Block 5	5,300 kg (11,700 lb)	Success

== See also ==
- A2100 – Similar satellite bus made by Lockheed Martin Space Systems and popular with Japanese satellite operators
- NEXTAR - NEC's standard satellite bus
- SSL 1300 – Another comparable satellite bus used by Japanese satellite operators and made by SSL
