= SDS-4 =

Small satellite

- Mission type: Technology
- Operator: JAXA
- COSPAR ID: 2012-025C
- SATCAT no.: 38339

Spacecraft properties
- Spacecraft type: SDS
- Launch mass: 50 kilograms (110 lb)

Start of mission
- Launch date: 17 May 2012, 16:39 UTC
- Rocket: H-IIA 202
- Launch site: Tanegashima Yoshinobu 1
- Contractor: Mitsubishi

End of mission
- Deactivated: 1 July 2021

Orbital parameters
- Reference system: Geocentric
- Regime: Low Earth
- Perigee altitude: 666 kilometres (414 mi)
- Apogee altitude: 678 kilometres (421 mi)
- Inclination: 98.23 degrees
- Period: 98.05 minutes
- Epoch: 30 October 2013, 08:31:20 UTC

SDS-4 (Small Demonstration Satellite 4) is a small satellite (50 cm cube with mass of 50 kg) developed by JAXA. It was launched as a secondary payload on the Shizuku mission on 17 May 2012 UTC. SDS-4 was the second satellite of JAXA's Small Demonstration Satellite programme, after SDS-1, and it aimed to demonstrate microsatellite bus components as well as its four main experiments. These included the on-board computer (OBC), power control unit (PCU), transceiver (TRX), a small MEMS rate sensor and QPSK communication technology. Its first-flight results were reported by JAXA engineers in 2012. In 2019, its ownership was transferred to the SKY Perfect JSAT Corporation (JSAT). Operation was terminated by the end of June 2021.

== Equipment ==
SPAISE (SPace-based Automatic Identification SystEm) - test on-orbit a receiver for picking up signals from Automatic Identification System transmitters on ships well out to sea, and determine how space-based reception is affected by interference between nearby transmitters and by environmental conditions. FOX (Flat heat-pipe on-orbit experiment) - to test whether flat heat pipes work in space in accordance with theoretical models and with tests on Earth IST (In-flight experiment of Solar absorption rate with THERME) - to acquire information about the effect of sunlight in space on thermal coatings, re-flying the THERME instrument developed by CNES for testing different thermal coatings. QCM (Quartz Crystal Microbalance) - to test whether a Japanese-manufactured quartz microbalance works well in monitoring contamination of the satellite from assembly to on-orbit operation.
