= MARK IVB Meteorological Data Station AN/UMQ-13 =

US Air Force meteorological data station

The AN/UMQ-13(V) system or MARK IV-B, is a meteorological data station that is owned and operated by the United States Space Force. This system allows meteorologists from around the globe to analyze and forecast meteorological data from polar orbiting satellites belonging to, National Oceanic and Atmospheric Administration (NOAA), Defense Meteorological Satellite Program (DMSP). The MARK IVB also uses geostationary orbiting satellites to include Geostationary Operational Environmental Satellites (GOES), Japan's Geostationary Meteorological Satellite (GMS), and Meteosat which is operated in cooperation between EUMETSAT and the European Space Agency.

There are nine operational MARK IVB terminals world-wide to provide operational missions with tactical meteorological information for a specific location. With the rapid changes in technology, the MARK IVB operates a Windows based software allowing for the rapid analyzing of meteorological images. Older models of this system were unable to process microwave data which resulted in new techniques and upgraded to both the satellites and the MARK IVB terminals. The upgrades to satellite sensors enable the ability for both satellites and meteorologists to detect weather conditions such as thunderstorms, lightning, volcanic ash, and fog. Both commercial and military aircraft can be severely affected by these weather conditions.
