= Stars-AO =

Japanese scientific micro satellite

Stars-AO Aoi
- Mission type: Optical
- Operator: Shizuoka University
- COSPAR ID: 2018-084
- SATCAT no.: 43679
- Website: https://stars-ao.info/

Spacecraft properties
- Manufacturer: Shizuoka University
- Payload mass: 1 kg (2 lb)
- Dimensions: 10cm x 10cm x 10cm

Start of mission
- Launch date: October 29, 2018 04:08:00 UTC
- Rocket: H-IIA-202
- Launch site: Tanegashima Yoshinobu 1
- Contractor: MHI

Orbital parameters
- Reference system: Geocentric
- Regime: Sun-synchronous orbit
- Perigee altitude: 591.7 kilometres (367.7 mi)
- Apogee altitude: 606.4 kilometres (376.8 mi)
- Inclination: 97.8 degrees
- Period: 96.5 minutes

Main camera
- Wavelengths: visible

Stars-AO, also known as Aoi, is an experimental CubeSat carrying a small telescope for astronomical observation. Developed by Shizuoka University, it uses amateur radio frequencies to communicate with the ground.

== Overview ==
STARS-AO (Astronomical Observation), also known as Aoi, is a 1U CubeSat developed at Shizuoka University as part of its STARS satellite series. The aim of the mission was to demonstrate a compact, high-sensitivity telescope for astronomical observations from orbit, sending the images down to Earth via amateur radio. It was launched on 29 October 2018 from Tanegashima aboard an H-IIA rocket as a secondary payload and was placed into a sun-synchronous orbit at an altitude of approximately 590–606 km. Transmission from the satellite stopped about 10 May 2019, a circumstance which the project team explained was due to a decrease in onboard power.
