= Information Gathering Satellite =

Japanese spy satellites

Information Gathering Satellite (情報収集衛星, Jōhō Shūshū Eisei) are the satellites of the Japanese spy satellite program. It was started as a response to the 1998 North Korean missile test over Japan. The satellite program's main mission is to provide early warning of impending hostile launches in the region. This program is under the direct control of the cabinet. All Information Gathering Satellites have been launched by H-IIA rockets from the Tanegashima Space Center.

== History ==
On 28 March 2003, presumably partly in response to North Korea's launch of a Taepodong-1 missile over Japan in 1998, and partly to provide a source of satellite images other than through cooperation with the US, where the US charged roughly US$10,000 for each satellite image, Japan launched a radar and an optical spy satellite, officially known as IGS 1A and IGS 1B. These satellites follow one another at 37-minute separation in a 492 km orbit, which passes over Pyongyang at 11:22 each day, according to observations collected on the satellite watching mailing list.

The program suffered a setback when Japan lost the second pair of satellites because of an H-IIA launch failure on 29 November 2003.

Except the satellite which failed in launching, a second optical surveillance satellite IGS 3A was launched on 11 September 2006.

A third optical satellite IGS 4A and a second radar satellite IGS 4B were launched on 24 February 2007. IGS 4A is a more advanced and experimental optical satellite.

A fourth optical satellite IGS 5A was launched on 28 November 2009. This satellite has a higher resolution than the previous generations.

Late March 2007, the first SAR satellite in the series, IGS 1B, suffered a critical power failure. The satellite has since been observed to steadily come down and was clearly no longer under control. An uncontrolled re-entry of this satellite occurred on 26 July 2012. Since summer 2010, another of the SAR satellites, IGS 4B has also been unable to carry out its monitoring functions.

On 9 February 2020, Japan launched IGS-Optical 7 reconnaissance satellite from the Tanegashima Space Center aboard an H-2A rocket. The launch had been delayed by 12 days due to a nitrogen leak, located within a system that provided conditioned air to the rocket, which was discovered sometime before the countdown to launch was aborted on 27 January. Following the discovery of the leak, the rocket was returned to its vertical assembly building, where it underwent repairs. Following the completion of the repairs, the rocket was rolled back out to Launch Pad No. 1 on 7 February, before the scheduled second launch attempt.

== List of launches ==
Launch Date (UTC)	NORAD Designation	Japanese Government Designation	Sensor Type	NORAD ID	International code	Status	Generation	Believed Resolution	Initial Orbital Parameter	Vehicle	Result
28 March 2003	IGS 1A	IGS-Optical 1	Optical	27698	2003-009A	Retired	1st generation of optical	Panchromatic sensor: About 1 m (mono); Multi-spectral sensor: About 5 m (color)	486–491 km, 97.3°, 94.4 min	H2A 2024	Success
28 March 2003	IGS 1B	IGS-Radar 1	SAR	27699	2003-009B	Retired	1st generation of SAR	About 1~3 m	486–491 km, 97.3°, 94.4 min	H2A 2024	Success
29 November 2003	N/A	Nameless for launching failure	Optical	N/A	N/A	N/A	1st generation of optical	Panchromatic sensor: About 1 m (mono); Multi-spectral sensor: About 5 m (color)	N/A	H2A 2024	Failure
29 November 2003	N/A	Nameless for launching failure	SAR	N/A	N/A	N/A	1st generation of SAR	About 1~3 m	N/A	H2A 2024	Failure
11 September 2006	IGS 3A	IGS-Optical 2	Optical	29393	2006-037A	Retired	2nd generation of optical (Improved type)	1 m	478–479 km, 97.4°, 94.2 min	H2A 202	Success
24 February 2007	IGS 4A	IGS-Optical 3V	Optical	30586	2007-005A	Retired	3rd generation of optical (Largely improved type)	About 60 cm	481–494 km, 97.2°, 94.4 min	H2A 2024	Success
24 February 2007	IGS 4B	IGS-Radar 2	SAR	30587	2007-005B	Retired	2nd generation of SAR (Improved type)	1 m	481–494 km, 97.2°, 94.4 min	H2A 2024	Success
28 November 2009	IGS 5A	IGS-Optical 3	Optical	36104	2009-066A	Retired	3rd generation of optical (Largely improved type)	About 60 cm	Unknown	H2A 202	Success
22 September 2011	IGS 6A	IGS-Optical 4	Optical	37813	2011-050A	Retired	4th generation of optical	About 60 cm	Unknown	H2A 202	Success
12 December 2011	IGS 7A	IGS-Radar 3	SAR	37954	2011-075A	Operational	3rd generation of SAR	About 1 m	Unknown	H2A 202	Success
27 January 2013	IGS 8A	IGS-Radar 4	SAR	39061	2013-002A	Operational	3rd generation of SAR	About 1 m	Unknown	H2A 202	Success
27 January 2013	IGS 8B	IGS-Optical 5V	Optical	39062	2013-002B	Retired	5th generation of optical	40 cm	Unknown	H2A 202	Success
1 February 2015	IGS 9A	IGS-Radar Spare	SAR	40381	2015-004A	Operational	3rd generation of SAR	About 1 m	Unknown	H2A 202	Success
26 March 2015	IGS O-5	IGS-Optical 5	Optical	40538	2015-015A	Operational	5th generation of optical	30 cm or 40 cm	Unknown	H2A 202	Success
17 March 2017	IGS R-5	IGS-Radar 5	SAR	42072	2017-015A	Operational	4th generation of SAR	50 cm	Unknown	H2A 202	Success
27 February 2018	IGS O-6	IGS-Optical 6	Optical	43223	2018-021A	Operational		30 cm	Unknown	H2A 202	Success
12 June 2018	IGS R-6	IGS-Radar 6	SAR	43495	2018-052A	Operational		50 cm	Unknown	H2A 202	Success
9 February 2020	IGS O-7	IGS-Optical 7	Optical	45165	2020-009A	Operational		Higher performance than 30 cm	Unknown	H2A 202	Success
26 January 2023	IGS R-7	IGS-Radar 7	SAR	55329	2023-012A	Operational		Higher performance than IGS R-6	Unknown	H2A 202	Success
12 January 2024	IGS O-8	IGS-Optical 8	Optical	58762	2024-010A	Operational		Higher performance than 25 cm	Unknown	H2A 202	Success
26 September 2024	IGS R-8	IGS-Radar 8	SAR	61439	2024-176A	Testing			Unknown	H2A 202	Success
