= SDS-1 =

Japanese demonstration spacecraft

- Mission type: Technology
- Operator: JAXA
- COSPAR ID: 2009-002F
- SATCAT no.: 33497
- Mission duration: 18 months

Spacecraft properties
- Spacecraft type: SDS
- Launch mass: 100 kilograms (220 lb)

Start of mission
- Launch date: 23 January 2009, 03:54 UTC
- Rocket: H-IIA 202
- Launch site: Tanegashima Yoshinobu 1
- Contractor: Mitsubishi

End of mission
- Disposal: Decommissioned
- Deactivated: 8 September 2010

Orbital parameters
- Reference system: Geocentric
- Regime: low Earth
- Perigee altitude: 671 kilometres (417 mi)
- Apogee altitude: 671 kilometres (417 mi)
- Inclination: 98.13 degrees
- Period: 98.03 minutes
- Epoch: 2 January 2014, 04:04:20 UTC

The Small Demonstration Satellite (SDS) is a spacecraft or satellite which is built as part of a JAXA programme to develop and demonstrate technology for and through small satellites. One of the mid-term goals is also to demonstrate formation flying. SDS-1 launched aboard an H-IIA rocket on 23 January 2009, as a secondary payload to GOSAT. The operation finished successfully on September 8, 2010. The programme started in spring 2006, and continues on from the MicroLabSat spacecraft, which was launched on 14 December 2002, and ceased operations on 27 September 2006.

== History ==
The SDS programme was started in spring 2006 to demonstrate new technologies on small platforms within JAXA's Space-technology Demonstration Research Center. The satellites are developed through collaboration between JAXA and small and medium-sized space companies, with JAXA keeping design authority and choosing the technologies to be demonstrated. SDS-1 was designed and developed at JAXA's Institute of Aerospace Technology. The satellite body is box-shaped, with two solar panels deployed in orbit, and it carries batteries.

Reported experiment results were positive. The multi-mode transponder (MTP) worked very well throughout the mission, and the device was planned for use in JAXA's future "King-size" satellites. The AMI microprocessor experiment was reported as working well, as were the GPSR, MSS and ACMR equipment. The thin-film solar cell experiment compared the degradation of silicon cells, used as a reference, with that of thin-film cells. The dosimeter measured the radiation dose absorbed in orbit and provided the data.
