= DSN-2 =

Japanese communications satellite

- Names: Kirameki-2
- Mission type: Communications
- Operator: DSN Corporation
- COSPAR ID: 2017-005A
- SATCAT no.: 41940
- Mission duration: 15 years (planned)

Spacecraft properties
- Spacecraft: Kirameki-2
- Spacecraft type: DSN
- Bus: DS-2000
- Manufacturer: Mitsubishi Electric

Start of mission
- Launch date: 24 January 2017, 07:44:00 UTC
- Rocket: H-IIA 204
- Launch site: Tanegashima, LA-Y
- Contractor: Mitsubishi Heavy Industries
- Entered service: March 2017

Orbital parameters
- Reference system: Geocentric orbit
- Regime: Geostationary orbit

Transponders
- Band: X-band
- Coverage area: Japan

DSN-2, also known as Kirameki-2 (きらめき), is a geostationary communications satellite operated by DSN Corporation, a subsidiary of SKY Perfect JSAT Group. Its payload is a pure X-band transceiver and is used for military communications by the Japanese military. It was launched and successfully deployed on 24 January 2017 using a H-IIA rocket flying in its heaviest configuration, the H-IIA 204. It is Japan's first dedicated military communication satellite and is designed for at least fifteen years of service.

== History ==
JSAT, along with NEC, NTT Communications and Maeda Corporation formed a joint venture called DSN Corporation. On 15 January 2013, DSN Corporation announced that it had closed a contract with the Ministry of Defense to execute the "Program to Upgrade and Operate X-Band Satellite Communications Functions, etc". The contract is a private finance initiative, where private funds, management and technical capabilities are used to upgrade and operate the Japanese military X-band satellite network.

Based on this program, DSN Corporation will manufacture and launch two satellites plus perform the necessary upgrades to ground control stations. It will also operate, manage and maintain the facilities and equipment through fiscal years 2015 to 2030. The total program cost was estimated at ¥122,074,026,613.

The plan called for the launch of the first satellite, DSN-1, in December 2015, with a start of operations in March 2016 and a termination of operations in April 2030. The second satellite, DSN-2, launched in January 2017, starting operations in March 2017. The program and the operations of the second satellite were expected to last until March 2031.

JSAT's role is the procurement and general management of the satellites. The first satellite, DSN-1, is actually an additional payload on one of JSAT's own satellites, Superbird-8. The second satellite, DSN-2 is a dedicated spacecraft built by Mitsubishi Electric.

== See also ==
- GSAT-7
- 2017 in spaceflight
