= UNIFORM-1 =

Japanese micro-satellite

- Mission type: Earth observation satellite
- Operator: Wakayama University
- COSPAR ID: 2014-029B
- SATCAT no.: 39767
- Website: UNIFORM-1 Page

Spacecraft properties
- Launch mass: 50 kg (110 lb)
- Dimensions: 50 cm × 50 cm × 50 cm (20 in × 20 in × 20 in)
- Power: 140W

Start of mission
- Launch date: 03:05, 24 May 2014 (UTC)
- Rocket: H-IIA 202
- Launch site: Tanegashima, LA-Y

Orbital parameters
- Reference system: Geocentric
- Regime: Sun Synchronous
- Eccentricity: 0.0013
- Perigee altitude: 629.8 km
- Apogee altitude: 647.4 km
- Inclination: 97.9
- Period: 97.5 min

Transponders
- Band: S band and X band

UNIFORM-1 or University International Formation Mission is a Japanese micro-satellite launched in 2014. The satellite is built around a wildfire detection camera and features the following instruments:

- Microbolometer infrared camera with resolution 200m and swath width 100 km.
- visible-light camera to assist in wildfire detection

All instruments are powered by solar cells mounted on the spacecraft body and stub wings, with estimated electrical power of over 100W.

== Launch ==
UNIFORM-1 was launched from Tanegashima, Japan, on 24 May 2014 at 03:05:00 UTC by an H-IIA 202.

== Mission ==
The satellite is intended for wildfire detection, especially in the south-east Asia region. The satellite has a less accurate infrared sensor compared to other infrared satellites, but an envisioned constellation of UNIFORM satellites would allow for a short revisit time at the fraction of the cost of the Landsat 7 or MODIS satellites. Mission data is down-linked in S-band and X-band, while control up-link is S-band only.

The Wakayama University and JAXA has refused to publish data and/or information which are not officially published.

== See also ==
- 2014 in spaceflight
- Moderate-Resolution Imaging Spectroradiometer
- Advanced Very High Resolution Radiometer
- Advanced Spaceborne Thermal Emission and Reflection Radiometer
- Landsat 7
