= Himawari 9 =

Japanese weather satellite

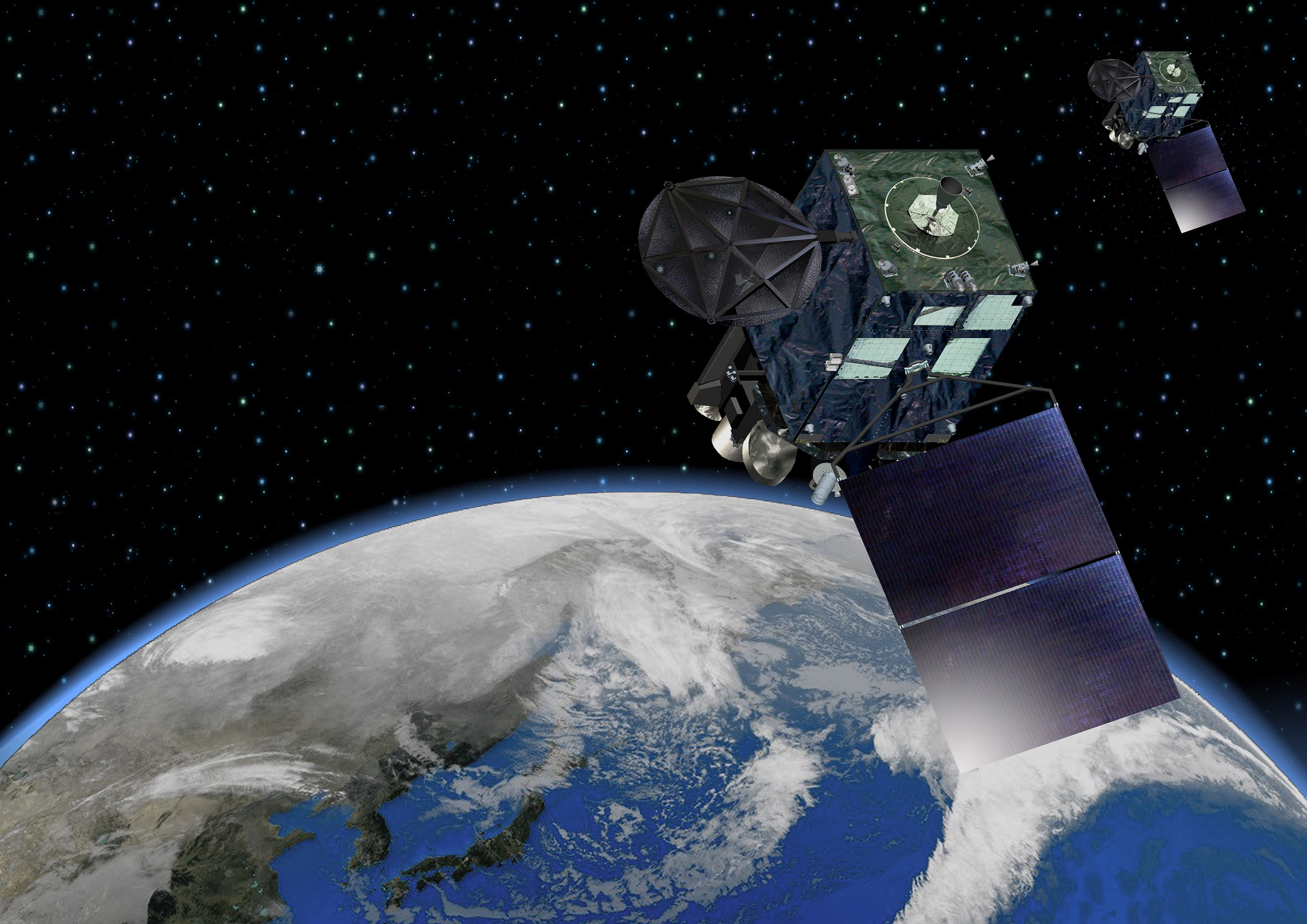
- Artist's rendering of Himawari 8 and 9
- Mission type: Weather satellite
- Operator: JMA
- COSPAR ID: 2016-064A
- SATCAT no.: 41836
- Mission duration: 8 years (planned)

Spacecraft properties
- Bus: DS2000
- Manufacturer: Mitsubishi Electric
- Launch mass: 3500 kg
- Dry mass: 1300 kg
- Power: 2.6 kilowatts from solar array

Start of mission
- Launch date: 06:20, 2 November 2016 (UTC)
- Rocket: H-IIA 202
- Launch site: Tanegashima LA-Y1
- Contractor: Mitsubishi Heavy Industries
- Entered service: 05:00, 13 December 2022 (UTC)

Orbital parameters
- Reference system: Geocentric
- Regime: Geostationary
- Longitude: 140.7° East
- Perigee altitude: 35,783 km (22,235 mi)
- Apogee altitude: 35,791 km (22,239 mi)
- Inclination: ~0.03 degrees
- Epoch: Planned

Himawari 9 (ひまわり9号, Himawari Kyū-gō) is a Japanese weather satellite, the ninth of the Himawari geostationary weather satellite operated by the Japan Meteorological Agency. The spacecraft was constructed by Mitsubishi Electric, and is the second of two similar satellites to be based on the DS-2000 bus.

== Launch ==
Himawari 9 was launched on 2 November 2016, 06:20:00 UTC, atop a H-IIA rocket flying from the Yoshinobu Launch Complex Pad 1 at the Tanegashima Space Center, and by 11 November 2016 it reached its assigned position (140.7°E) in geostationary orbit. After initial function tests, it was put on standby until 05:00 UTC by 13 December 2022, when it succeeded Himawari 8.

The launch was scheduled initially on 1 November 2016, but postponed for one day due to forecasted inclement weather.

At launch, the mass of the satellite is about 3,500 kilograms (7,700 lb). It has a design life of 15 years with 8 years of operational life. Power is supplied by a single gallium arsenide solar panel, which provides up to 2.6 kilowatts of power. The main instrument aboard Himawari 9 is a 16 channel multispectral imager to capture visible light and infrared images of the Asia-Pacific region.

As part of an outreach project organized by the Young Astronauts Club Japan the launch also carried manga artwork drawn by Chūya Koyama, author of the Space Brothers manga.

== Gallery ==
The first true-color image from Himawari 9

The first full disk true-color image from Himawari 9 since being operational

16-Channel Mosaic of the Advanced Himawari Imager (AHI)
