= Himawari (satellites) =

Geostationary meteorological satellite

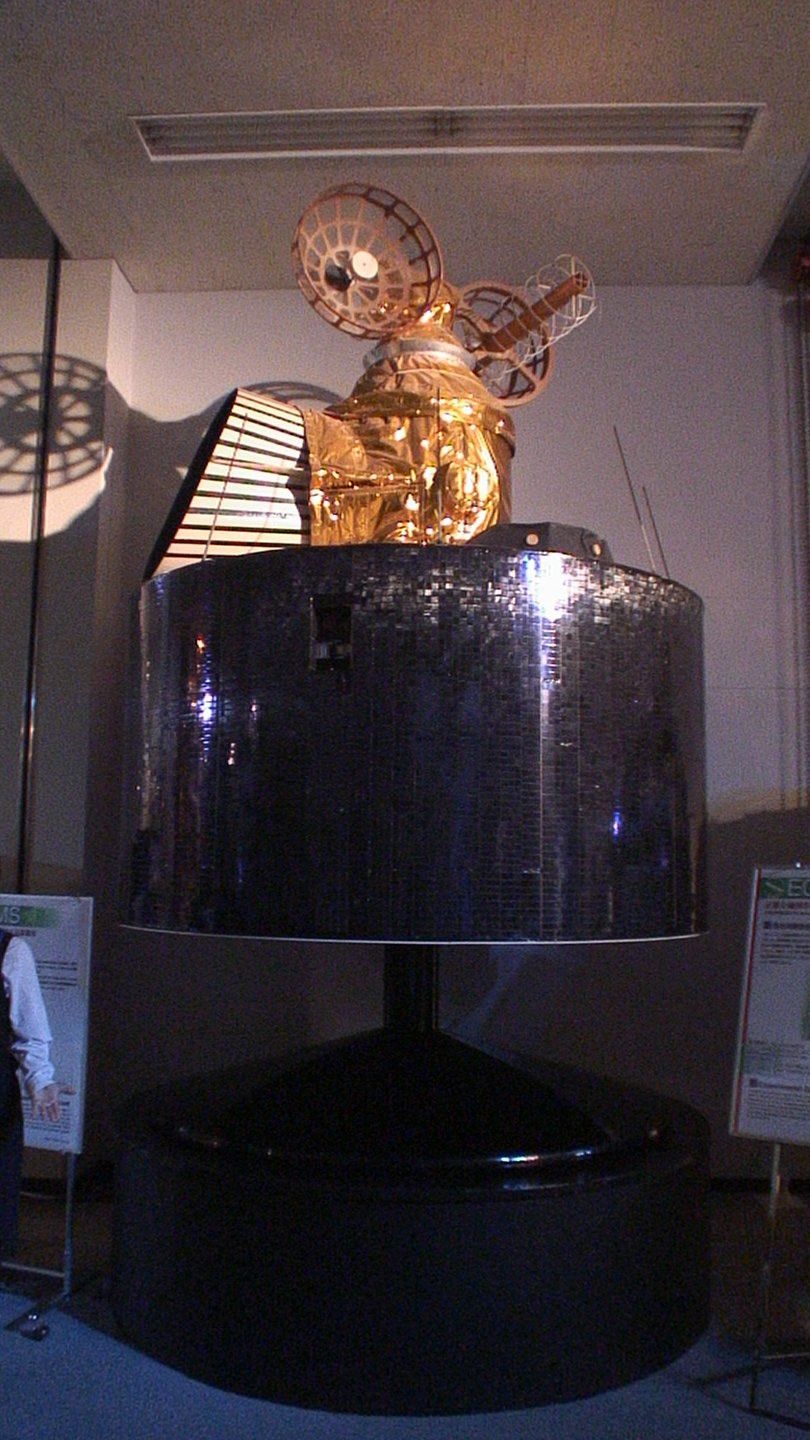
GMS, the first generation of Himawari

The Himawari (ひまわり; 'sunflower') geostationary satellites, operated by the Japan Meteorological Agency (JMA), support weather forecasting, tropical cyclone tracking, and meteorology research. Most meteorological agencies in East Asia, Southeast Asia, Australia and New Zealand use the satellites for their own weather monitoring and forecasting operations.

Originally also named Geostationary Meteorological Satellites (GMS), since the launch of GMS-1 (Himawari 1) in 1977, there have been three generations, including GMS, MTSAT, and Himawari 8/9; Himawari 8/9 satellites are currently available for operational use.

== Status ==
Name	Launch date (UTC)	Retirement	Rocket	Launch site
GMS-1 (Himawari 1)	14 Jul 1977	30 Jun 1989	Delta 2914	Cape Canaveral
GMS-2 (Himawari 2)	11 Aug 1981	20 Nov 1987	N-II (N8F)	Tanegashima
GMS-3 (Himawari 3)	3 Aug 1984	23 Jun 1995	N-II (N13F)	Tanegashima
GMS-4 (Himawari 4)	6 Sep 1989	24 Feb 2000	H-I (H20F)	Tanegashima
GMS-5 (Himawari 5)	18 Mar 1995	21 Jul 2005	H-II (F3)	Tanegashima
MTSAT-1 (Mirai 1)	15 Nov 1999	Launch failure	H-II (F8)	Tanegashima
GOES-9 (Pacific GOES)	23 May 1995	14 Jun 2007	Atlas I (AC-77)	Cape Canaveral
MTSAT-1R (Himawari 6)	26 Feb 2005	4 Dec 2015	H-IIA (F7)	Tanegashima
MTSAT-2 (Himawari 7)	18 Feb 2006	10 Mar 2017	H-IIA (F9)	Tanegashima
Himawari 8	7 Oct 2014	Stand-by	H-IIA (F25)	Tanegashima
Himawari 9	2 Nov 2016	Operational	H-IIA (F31)	Tanegashima
Himawari 10	FY 2030	2045	H3	TBD

== History ==
In March 2023, Mitsubishi Electric announced that they had won the contract to build Himawari 10. Himawari 10 was originally scheduled to be launched in the fiscal year of 2028 (April 2028-March 2029), but has been delayed to the fiscal year of 2030 (April 2030-March 2031) due to development of a satellite component being slower than expected.

== See also ==
- Japan Meteorological Agency (JMA)
