= Super Low Altitude Test Satellite =

Japanese satellite

Super Low Altitude Test Satellite (SLATS)
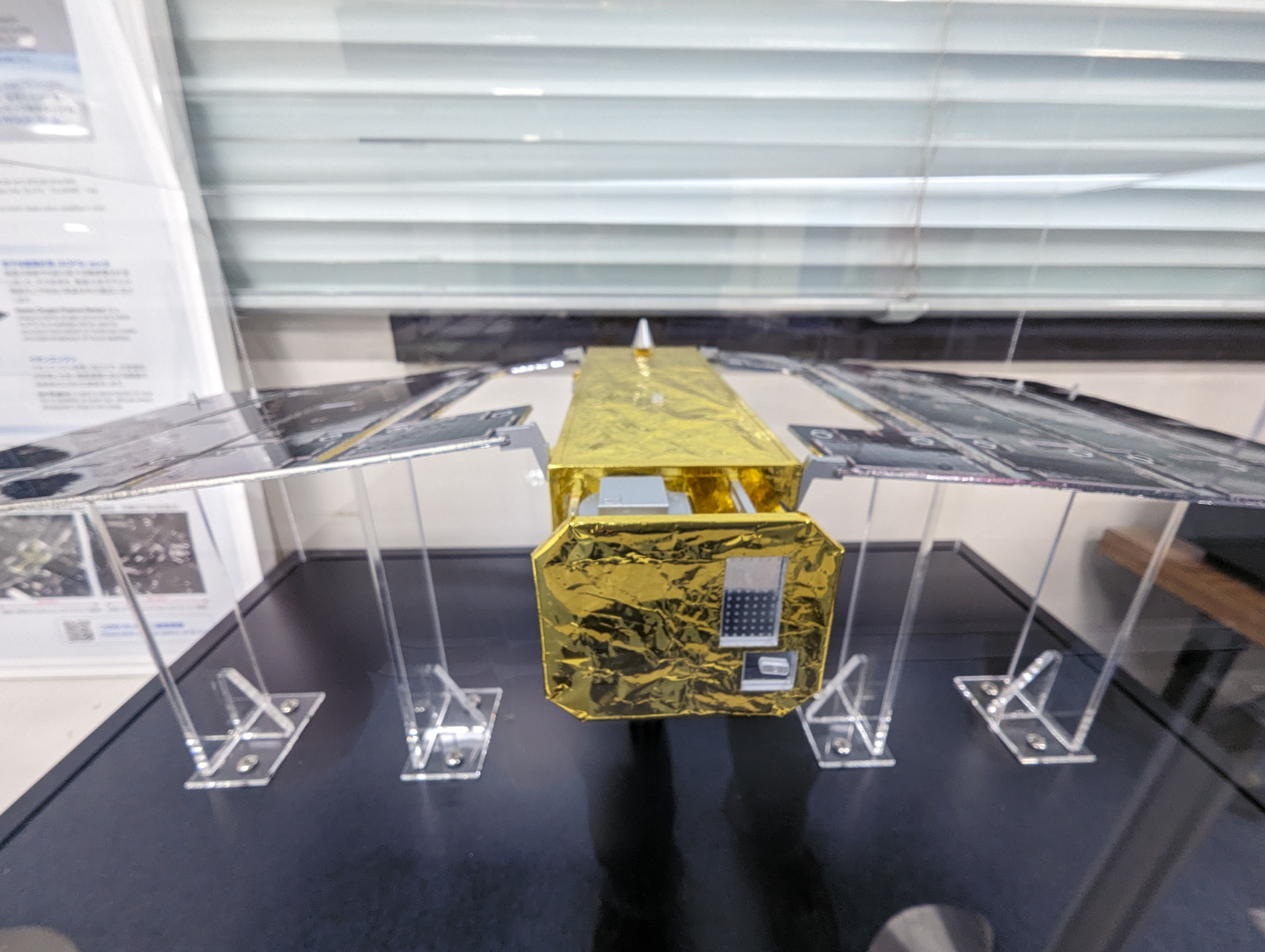
- Scale model of SLATS at the Tsukuba Space Center
- Mission type: Technology demonstration
- Operator: JAXA
- COSPAR ID: 2017-082B
- SATCAT no.: 43066
- Mission duration: 1 year, 9 months and 8 days

Spacecraft properties
- Manufacturer: Mitsubishi Electric Corp.
- Launch mass: 400 kilograms (880 lb)
- Power: Solar panel, 1140 W

Start of mission
- Launch date: 23 December 2017 01:26:22 UTC
- Rocket: H-IIA 202
- Launch site: Tanegashima Yoshinobu 1

End of mission
- Deactivated: 1 October 2019
- Decay date: 1 October 2019

Orbital parameters
- Regime: Low Earth orbit
- Altitude: 180 kilometres (110 miles)-268 kilometres (167 miles); Lowest record - 167.4 kilometres (104.0 miles)

Super Low Altitude Test Satellite (SLATS) or Tsubame was a JAXA satellite intended to demonstrate operations in very low Earth orbit (VLEO, below 200 km), using ion engines to counteract aerodynamic drag from the Earth's atmosphere which is substantial at such lower orbital altitudes. It was launched on 23 December 2017, and decommissioned on 1 October 2019.

Most Earth observation satellites operate at altitudes of 600 to 800 km, while SLATS flew at 167.4 km from 23 to 30 September 2019, the lowest point of its mission, which stood as a Guinness World Record for an Earth observation satellite. At that altitude a satellite faces about a thousand times more atmospheric drag than at higher altitudes, and atomic oxygen present in the thin atmosphere can cause spacecraft to deteriorate quickly. To cope with this, SLATS was built from special oxygen-resistant materials and used an ion engine together with gas-jet thrusters to keep its orbit and the precise positioning needed to capture surface images and measure oxygen concentration.

The spacecraft was equipped with sensors to determine atomic oxygen density, an exposure facility to measure material degradation in the 200 km orbit, and a small camera. Initial designs had conventional, though slightly canted, solar panels (compare to the aerodynamic shape and on-body solar panels of GOCE, which flew in a 255 km orbit). SLATS was equipped with the high resolution optical camera SHIROP (Small and HIgh Resolution Optical Sensor) for conducting Earth observation from VLEO. SLATS's nickname Tsubame is Japanese for barn swallow. According to JAXA the name was chosen because the thin, elongated satellite in super low orbit with its set of solar array wings was reminiscent of a swallow flying low to the ground.

SLATS was launched 23 December 2017 on a H-IIA rocket alongside the GCOM-C (Shikisai) satellite to a 630 km orbit, followed by orbit-lowering manoeuvres by a combination of chemical propulsion and aerobraking, with final operation at an altitude below 180 km. SLATS was operated at 7 altitudes: 271.5 and 216.8 km each for 38 days, and 250, 240, 230, 181.1 and 167.4 km each for 7 days. At 167.4 km the RCS thrusters were used in addition to the ion thruster to maintain altitude.

The operation of the satellite was finished on 30 September 2019, and it was decommissioned in orbit on 1 October 2019 by terminating the communication radio and power. The satellite deorbited 1 October 2019. On 30 December 2019, Guinness World Records recognized Tsubame's achievement, which reached the lowest altitude ever among Earth observation satellites.
