= Himawari 8 =

Japanese weather satellite

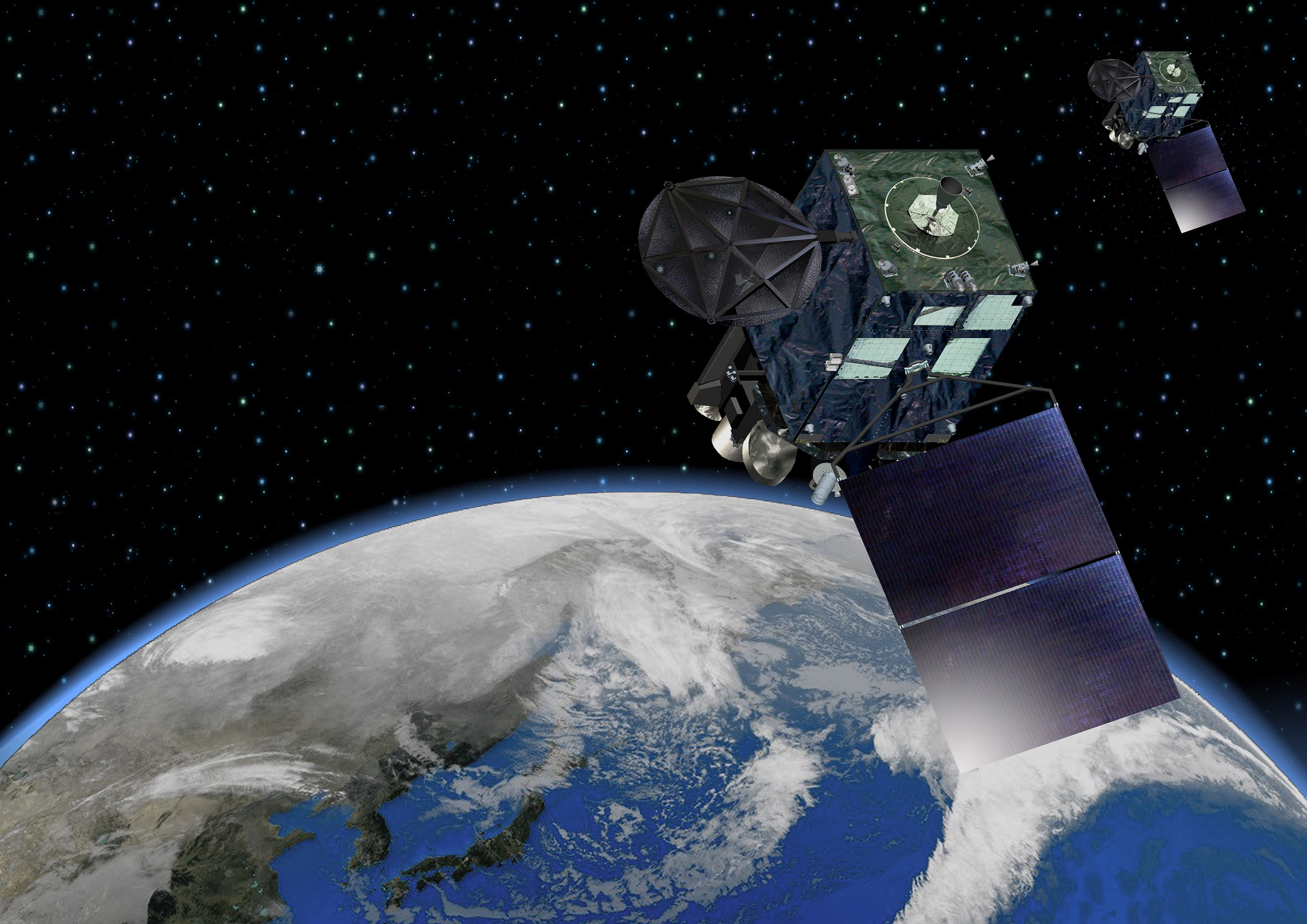
- Rendering of Himawari 8 and 9
- Mission type: Weather satellite
- Operator: JMA
- COSPAR ID: 2014-060A
- SATCAT no.: 40267
- Mission duration: 8 years (planned)

Spacecraft properties
- Bus: DS2000
- Manufacturer: Mitsubishi Electric
- Launch mass: 3500 kg
- Dry mass: 1300 kg
- Power: 2.6 kilowatts from solar array

Start of mission
- Launch date: 7 October 2014, 05:16 UTC
- Rocket: H-IIA 202
- Launch site: Tanegashima LA-Y1
- Contractor: Mitsubishi Heavy Industries
- Entered service: 7 July 2015, 02:00 UTC

Orbital parameters
- Reference system: Geocentric
- Regime: Geostationary
- Longitude: 140.7° East
- Perigee altitude: 35,791 km (22,239 mi)
- Apogee altitude: 35,795 km (22,242 mi)
- Inclination: ~0.03 degrees
- Period: 1436.13 minutes
- Epoch: 22 January 2015, 22:13:28 UTC

Himawari 8 (ひまわり8号; lit. 'sunflower 8') is a Japanese weather satellite, the 8th of the Himawari geostationary weather satellites operated by the Japan Meteorological Agency. The spacecraft was constructed by Mitsubishi Electric with assistance from Boeing, and is the first of two similar satellites to be based on the DS2000 satellite bus. Himawari 8 entered operational service on 7 July 2015 and is the successor to MTSAT-2 (Himawari 7) which was launched in 2006.

== Launch ==
Himawari 8 was launched atop a H-IIA rocket flying from the Yoshinobu Launch Complex Pad 1 at the Tanegashima Space Center. The launch occurred at 05:16 UTC on 7 October 2014 and reached its operational geostationary orbit in October 2014, at 35,786 kilometers and 140.7 degrees East.

Himawari 9, which is identical to Himawari 8, was launched on 2 November 2016 and placed in a stand-by orbit until 05:00 UTC by 13 December 2022, when it succeeded Himawari 8.

== Purpose ==
The role of Himawari 8 is to provide typhoon, rainstorm, weather forecast and other related reports for Japan, East Asia, and Western Pacific region. It is also responsible for ensuring the safety of ships, aviation and observing the environment of the earth.

Its temporal and spatial resolution enables it to observe disastrous events in remote places, such as volcanic eruptions. The Himawari satellite was able to capture the Tianjin explosions in 2015, and the Hunga Tonga–Hunga Ha'apai eruption in 2022.

Data recorded from the Japanese Himawari 8 will be made freely available for use by meteorological agencies in other countries. For example, it is currently in use by the Australian Bureau of Meteorology, providing infrared imaging.

== Design ==
The DS2000 satellite bus has a lifespan of 15 years, however the expected operational lifespan of Himawari 8 is expected to be limited by its instruments which are only designed for 8 years of service. At launch, the mass of the satellite was about 3,500 kilograms (7,700 lb). Power is supplied by a single gallium arsenide solar panel, which provides up to 2.6 kilowatts of power.

=== Instruments ===
==== Advanced Himawari Imager ====
The primary instrument aboard Himawari 8, the Advanced Himawari Imager (AHI), is a 16 channel multispectral imager to capture visible light and infrared images of the Asia-Pacific region. The instrument was designed and built by Exelis Geospatial Systems (now Harris Space & Intelligence Systems) and has similar spectral and spatial characteristics to the Advanced Baseline Imager (ABI) used in the American GOES-16, -17, -T, and -U satellites. The AHI can produce images with a maximum resolution between 500m and 2km (depending on the spectral band) and can provide full disk observations every 10 mins and images of Japan every 2.5 minutes. The Australian Bureau of Meteorology CEO Dr Rob Vertessy stated that Himawari 8 "generates about 50 times more data than the previous satellite". A recent study reported that Himawari-8 had acquired cloud-free observations every 4 days, while capturing the seasonal changes of vegetation in the cloud-prone region of Southeast Asia more accurately than before.

Imager Specifications
Wavelength (μm)	Band number	Spatial resolution at SSP (km)	Central wavelength (μm)
0.47	1	1	0.47063
0.51	2	1	0.51000
0.64	3	0.5	0.63914
0.86	4	1	0.85670
1.6	5	2	1.6101
2.3	6	2	2.2568
3.9	7	2	3.8853
6.2	8	2	6.2429
6.9	9	2	6.9410
7.3	10	2	7.3467
8.6	11	2	8.5926
9.6	12	2	9.6372
10.4	13	2	10.4073
11.2	14	2	11.2395
12.4	15	2	12.3806
13.3	16	2	13.2807

==== Space Environmental Data Acquisition Monitor ====
The Space Environmental Data Acquisition Monitor (SEDA) is the second instrument aboard Himawari 8, and it consists of two sensors: SEDA-e for detecting high energy electrons and SEDA-p for detecting high energy protons. SEDA-e is a single element with 8 stacked charge collecting plates. It has an energy range of 0.2-4.5 MeV and a field of view of ±78.3°. SEDA-p consists of 8 separate proton telescope elements. In total, SEDA-e has an energy range of 15-100 MeV and a field of view of ±39.35°. Both sensors have a time resolution of 10 seconds. The data from this instrument is transmitted to a ground station in Saitama, Japan with a Ka-band signal and is ultimately provided to the National Institute of Information and Communications Technology (NICT) for use monitoring space weather events along the Japanese meridian.

== Gallery ==
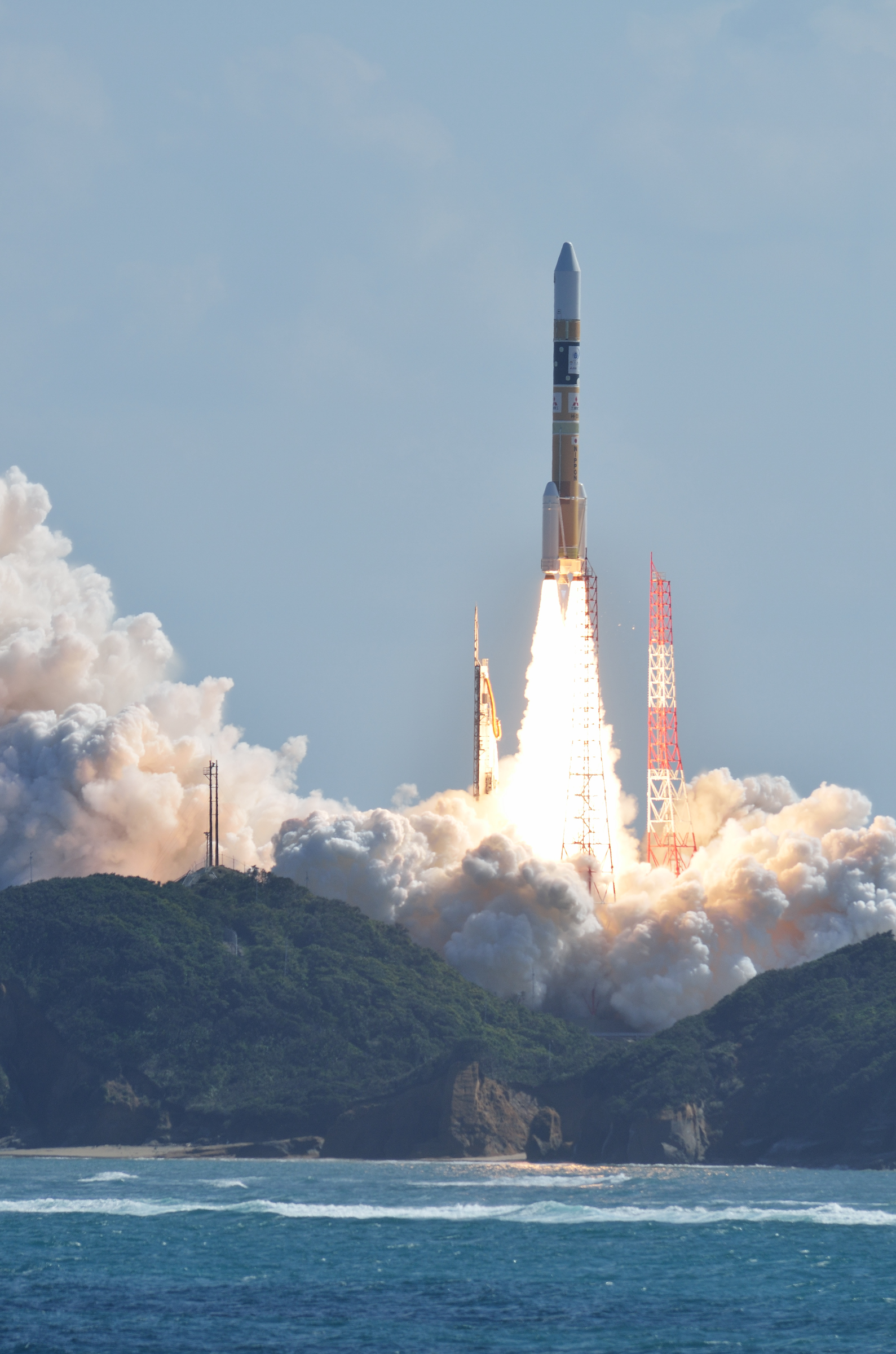
Liftoff of the H-IIA rocket carrying Himawari 8 on 7 October 2014

The first true-color PNG image from Himawari 8 on 25 January 2015

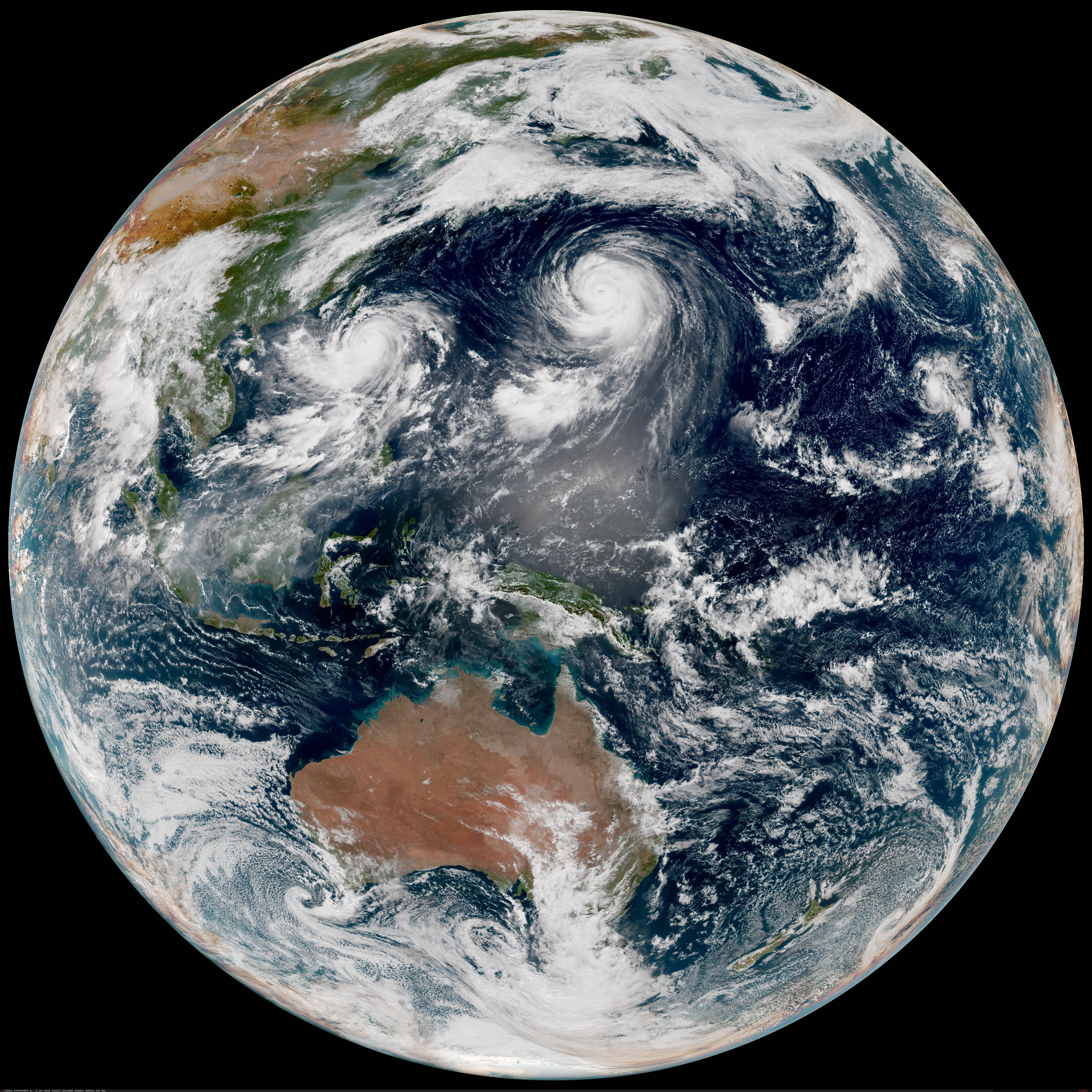
Example of a Rayleigh-corrected, true-color full disk image created from the AHI sensor

The Hunga Tonga–Hunga Haʻapai eruption captured by Himawari 8 on 15 January 2022
