= ETS-VIII =

Japanese communications demonstration satellite

Kiku 8
- Mission type: Communications; Technology
- Operator: JAXA; NICT; NTT
- COSPAR ID: 2006-059A
- SATCAT no.: 29656
- Website: www.jaxa.jp/projects/sat/ets8/index_e.html
- Mission duration: 10 years

Spacecraft properties
- Bus: DS-2000
- Manufacturer: Mitsubishi Electric
- Launch mass: 5,800 kilograms (12,800 lb)

Start of mission
- Launch date: 18 December 2006, 06:32 UTC
- Rocket: H-IIA 204
- Launch site: Tanegashima Yoshinobu 1
- Contractor: Mitsubishi
- Entered service: 9 May 2007

End of mission
- Deactivated: 10 January 2017

Orbital parameters
- Reference system: Geocentric
- Regime: Geostationary
- Longitude: 145.7° east
- Semi-major axis: 42,163.77 kilometres (26,199.35 mi)
- Eccentricity: 0.0005611
- Perigee altitude: 35,769 kilometres (22,226 mi)
- Apogee altitude: 35,816 kilometres (22,255 mi)
- Inclination: 3.04 degrees
- Period: 23.93 hours
- RAAN: 68.56 degrees
- Argument of perigee: 138.47 degrees
- Epoch: 29 October 2013, 19:34:27 UTC

JAXA Engineering Test Satellite ETS-VIII (Kiku 8) was the eighth technology test satellite in a series which started with ETS-1 in 1975 by NASDA. It was launched with the H-2A on December 18, 2006. ETS-VIII was developed by JAXA in cooperation with NICT and NTT. The aim of ETS-VIII was to enable satellite communications with small terminals. Unlike the Iridium satellites for mobile communication, ETS-VIII was positioned at GEO. However to fulfill the task, it was essential that the satellite carried two very large antennas. It was the first use of the 204 configuration (four strap-on boosters) of the H-IIA launch vehicle.

== Timetable ==
- December 20, 2000: Launch of LDREX, a demonstration of the large antenna reflector deployment, aboard Ariane 5. Deployment failed.
- October 14, 2006: Launch of LDREX-2 with the Ariane 5, model antenna deployed successfully.
- December 18, 2006: ETS-VIII was launched aboard H-IIA.
- December 26, 2006: Both antennas were deployed.
- January 9, 2007: GEO orbit injection.
- May 9, 2007: The satellite switched to normal operation phase.
- January 10, 2017: Decommissioned.
