= Sohla =

Japanese demonstration satellites

- Operator: Japan
- Website: Sohla Official Homepage

Spacecraft properties
- Spacecraft type: Demonstration satellites
- Manufacturer: SOHLA
- Launch mass: 50kg

Orbiter

Dock/berth/captureing

Sohla-1 and Sohla-2 are two 50 kg small demonstration satellites in development by Japan. The project was initiated by the SOHLA (Space Oriented Higashiosaka Leading Association) organisation in 2003. The aim of this group is to revitalize local economy by developing space technologies. In 2004 SOHLA signed a cooperation agreement with JAXA.

== Sohla 1 ==
The mission of Sohla-1 is to observe cloud building.

=== Launch ===
Sohla-1 was launched as a secondary payload to the GOSAT with the H-2A on January 23, 2009.

== Sohla 2 ==
SOHLA-2 is a 50 kg microsatellite and will be the first demonstrator of Panel ExTension SATellite (PETSAT) which was first proposed by the Nakasuka Laboratory of University of Tokyo. PETSAT consists of a combination of standardised subsystem panels that are hinged together and deploy/unfold once the spacecraft is in orbit. The PETSAT concept is configured such that mission designers can launch their own PETSAT for a significantly lower cost and shorter development time by providing the ability to select and assemble off-the-shelf panel subsystems as required. The main payload on SOHLA-2 is lightning monitoring experiment and the mission will also demonstrate end-of-life de-orbiting through the use of a low-cost on-board propulsion system.

SOHLA are currently investigating launch opportunities for SOHLA-2, targeted for end of 2007 into LEO.
