= H-IIA =

Expendable medium-lift launch vehicle

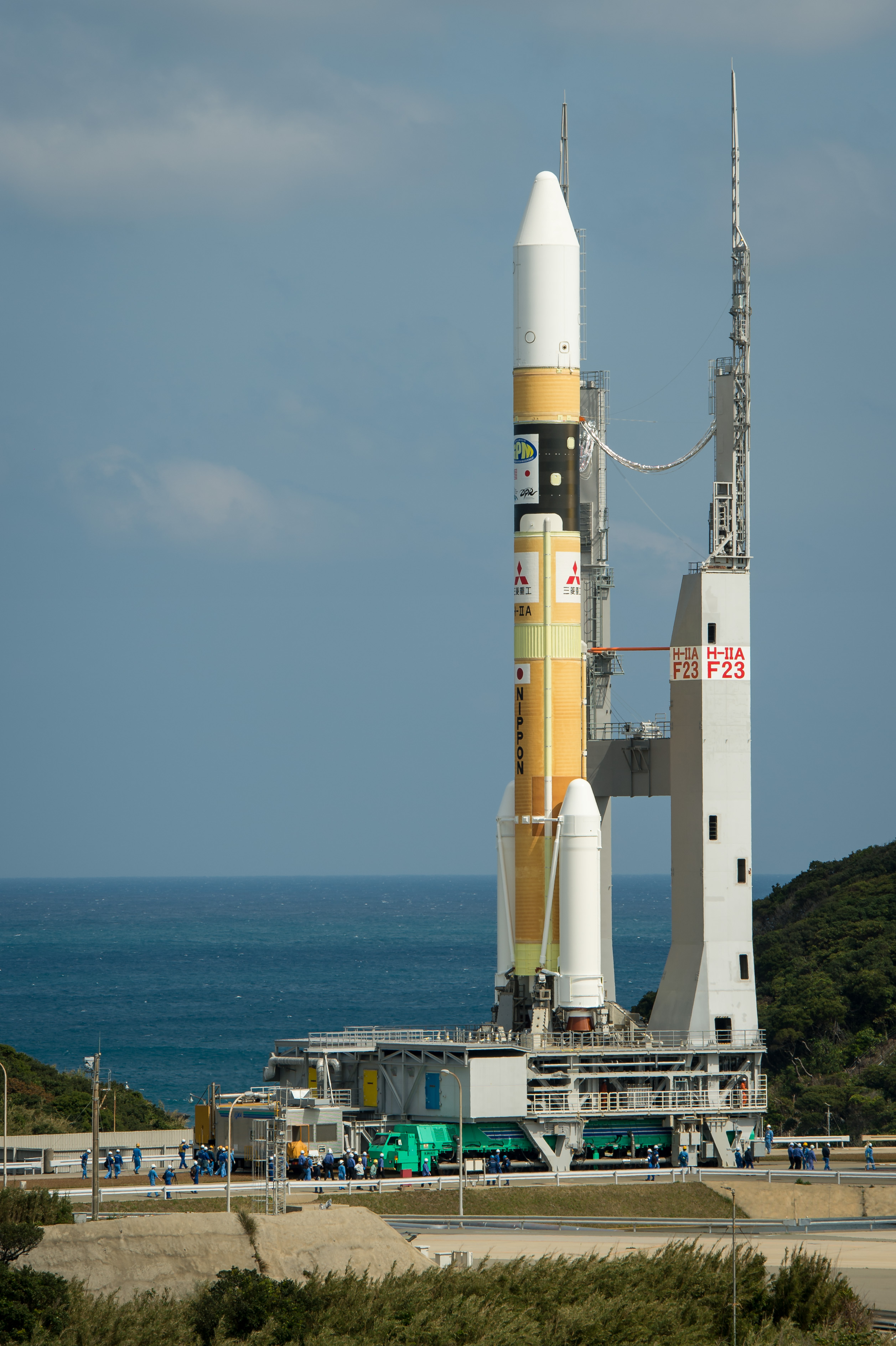
- H-IIA rolls out to the launch pad, February 2014
- Function: Medium-lift launch vehicle
- Manufacturer: Mitsubishi Heavy Industries
- Country of origin: Japan
- Cost per launch: US$90 million

Size
- Height: 53 m (174 ft)
- Diameter: 4 m (13 ft)
- Mass: 285,000–445,000 kg (628,000–981,000 lb)
- Stages: 2

Capacity

Payload to LEO
- Mass: 10,000–15,000 kg (22,000–33,000 lb)

Payload to GTO
- Mass: 4,100–6,000 kg (9,000–13,200 lb)

Associated rockets
- Family: H-II family
- Based on: H-II
- Derivative work: H-IIB · H3

Launch history
- Status: Retired
- Launch sites: Tanegashima, LA-Y1
- Total launches: 50; 202: 35; 204: 5; 2022: 3; 2024: 7
- Success(es): 49; 202: 35; 204: 5; 2022: 3; 2024: 6
- First flight: 202: 29 August 2001; 204: 18 December 2006; 2022: 26 February 2005; 2024: 4 February 2002
- Last flight: 202: 28 June 2025; 204: 22 December 2021; 2022: 14 September 2007; 2024: 23 February 2008
- Carries passengers or cargo: SELENE; Ibuki; Akatsuki; Hayabusa 2; Emirates Mars Mission

Boosters – SRB-A
- No. boosters: 2–4
- Height: 15.1 m (50 ft)
- Diameter: 2.5 m (8 ft 2 in)
- Maximum thrust: 2,260 kN (510,000 lb_{f})
- Total thrust: 4,520–9,040 kN (1,020,000–2,030,000 lb_{f})
- Specific impulse: 280 s (2.7 km/s)
- Burn time: 120 seconds
- Propellant: HTPB

Boosters (2022, 2024) – Castor 4A-XL
- No. boosters: 2–4
- Height: 12 m (38 ft)
- Diameter: 1.02 m (40.1 in)
- Gross mass: 14,983 kg (33,031 lb)
- Propellant mass: 13,112 kg (28,906 lb)
- Maximum thrust: 765 kN (172,060 lbf)
- Total thrust: 1,531–3,061 kN (344,120–688,240 lbf)
- Specific impulse: 282.6 s (2.771 km/s)
- Burn time: 58 seconds
- Propellant: HTPB/Al

First stage
- Height: 37.2 m (122 ft)
- Diameter: 4 m (13 ft)
- Powered by: 1 × LE-7A
- Maximum thrust: 1,098 kN (247,000 lb_{f})
- Specific impulse: 440 s (4.3 km/s)
- Burn time: 390 seconds
- Propellant: LH_{2} / LOX

Second stage
- Height: 9.2 m (30 ft)
- Diameter: 4 m (13 ft)
- Powered by: 1 × LE-5B
- Maximum thrust: 137 kN (31,000 lb_{f})
- Specific impulse: 447 s (4.38 km/s)
- Burn time: 534 seconds
- Propellant: LH_{2} / LOX

H-IIA (H-2A) was a Japanese expendable launch system that was developed and operated by Mitsubishi Heavy Industries (MHI) in collaboration with JAXA. It was primarily used to launch satellites into geostationary orbit, interplanetary probes, and Earth observation missions. Notable payloads launched by the H-IIA include Akatsuki, a Venus climate orbiter, and the Emirates Mars Mission, which was launched toward Mars in July 2020. All launches were conducted from the Tanegashima Space Center.

The H-IIA made its maiden flight on 29 August 2001 and flew a total of 50 times before its retirement on 28 June 2025. It achieved 49 successful launches, including a streak of 44 consecutive missions from 2003 to 2025. Management and production responsibility was transferred from JAXA to MHI on 1 April 2007, with Flight 13, carrying the SELENE lunar orbiter, being the first mission under private operation.

The H-IIA was derived from the earlier H-II launch vehicle and featured significant design changes aimed at improving reliability and reducing cost. Several variants were developed, with the final configuration, designated H2A 202, retired in 2025. A derivative design, the H-IIB, was introduced in 2009 and retired in 2020. The H-II series of launch vehicles have been succeeded by the H3 rocket, which conducted its first flight in March 2023.

== Vehicle description and variants ==
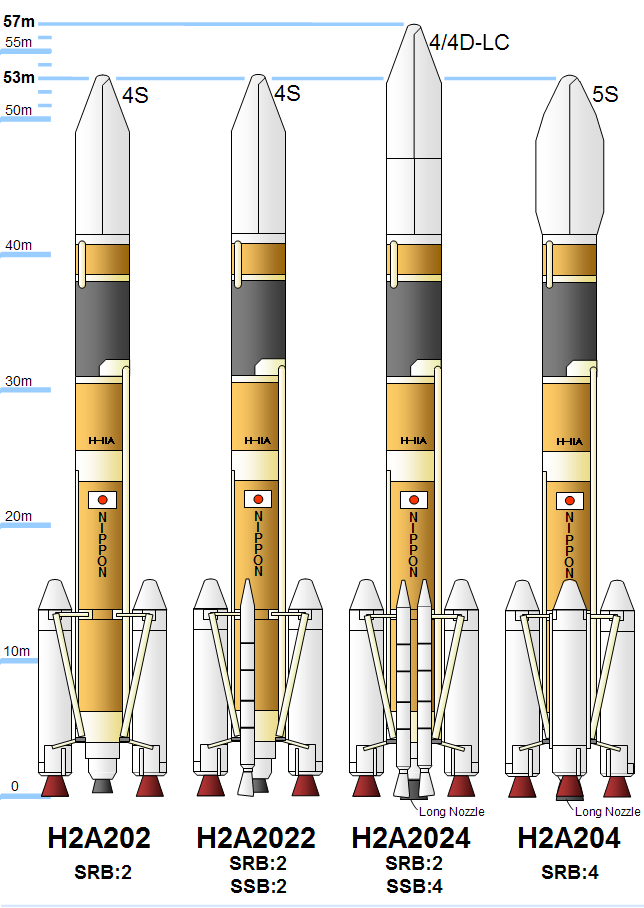
H-IIA rocket variants

The H-IIA had two-stage core powered by liquid hydrogen and liquid oxygen, and various configurations of boosters to provide additional thrust based on mission requirements.

The base and final active configuration, H2A 202, used two SRB-A type solid rocket boosters. Launch performance could be enhanced by adding up to two additional SRB-As for a total of four boosters, or by adding up to four Castor 4AXL solid strap-on boosters (SSBs), for a total of six boosters.

H-IIA configurations were designated by a three- or four-digit code following the prefix "H2A":

- The first digit indicates the number of core stages (always 2).
- The second digit indicates the number of liquid rocket boosters, which were planned but never developed (always 0).
- The third digit indicates the number of SRB-A solid rocket boosters (2 or 4).
- The optional fourth digit indicates the number of Castor 4AXL strap-on boosters (2 or 4).

Status

† Retired
‡ Never Flown

Designation	Mass t (lb)	Payload to GTO t (lb)	Boosters
H2A 202†	285 (628,000)	4.1 (9,000)	2 × SRB-A (SRB)
H2A 2022†	316 (697,000)	4.5 (9,900)	2 × SRB-A (SRB) + 2 × Castor 4AXL (SSB)
H2A 2024†	347 (765,000)	5 (11,000)	2 × SRB-A (SRB) + 4 × Castor 4AXL (SSB)
H2A 204†	445 (981,000)	6 (13,000)	4 × SRB-A (SRB)
H2A 212‡	403 (888,000)	7.5 (17,000)	2 × SRB-A (SRB) + 1 × LRB
H2A 222‡	520 (1,150,000)	9.5 (21,000)	2 × SRB-A (SRB) + 2 × LRBs

== Launch history ==
The first H-IIA was successfully launched on 29 August 2001, followed by a string of successes.

The sixth launch on 29 November 2003, intended to launch two IGS reconnaissance satellites, failed. JAXA announced that launches would resume in 2005, and the first successful flight took place on 26 February 2005 with the launch of MTSAT-1R.

The first launch for a mission beyond Earth orbit was on 14 September 2007 for the SELENE Moon mission. The first foreign payload on the H-IIA was the Australian FedSat-1 in 2002. As of March 2015, 27 out of 28 launches were successful.

A rocket with increased launch capabilities, H-IIB, is a derivative of the H-IIA family. H-IIB uses two LE-7A engines in its first stage, as opposed to one in H-IIA. The first H-IIB was successfully launched on 10 September 2009.

For the 29th flight on 24 November 2015, an H-IIA with an upgraded second stage launched the Telstar 12V satellite, the first commercial primary payload for a Japanese launch vehicle.

Flight	Date (UTC)	Type	Payload(s)	Outcome
TF1	29 August 2001; 07:00:00	H2A 202	VEP 2 LRE	Success
TF2	4 February 2002; 02:45:00	H2A 2024	VEP 3 MDS-1 (Tsubasa); DASH	Success
F3	10 September 2002; 08:20:00	H2A 2024	USERS; DRTS (Kodama)	Success
F4	14 December 2002; 01:31:00	H2A 202	ADEOS 2 (Midori 2); WEOS (Kanta-kun); FedSat 1 Micro LabSat 1	Success
F5	28 March 2003; 01:27:00	H2A 2024	IGS-Optical 1 IGS-Radar 1	Success
F6	29 November 2003; 04:33:00	H2A 2024	IGS-Optical; IGS-Radar	Failure
F6	A hot gas leak from SRB-A motor destroyed its separation system and the booster did not separate as planned. The weight of the spent motor prevented the vehicle from achieving its planned speed and height and it was destroyed via a ground command about 10 minutes into the flight.			
F7	26 February 2005; 09:25:00	H2A 2022	MTSAT-1R (Himawari 6)	Success
F8	24 January 2006; 01:33:00	H2A 2022	ALOS (Daichi)	Success
F9	18 February 2006; 06:27:00	H2A 2024	MTSAT-2 (Himawari 7)	Success
F10	11 September 2006; 04:35:00	H2A 202	IGS-Optical 2	Success
F11	18 December 2006; 06:32:00	H2A 204	ETS-VIII (Kiku 8)	Success
F12	24 February 2007; 04:41:00	H2A 2024	IGS-Radar 2 IGS-Optical 3V	Success
F13	14 September 2007; 01:31:01	H2A 2022	SELENE (Kaguya)	Success
F14	23 February 2008; 08:55:00	H2A 2024	WINDS (Kizuna)	Success
F15	23 January 2009; 03:54:00	H2A 202	GOSAT (Ibuki); SDS-1; STARS (Kūkai); KKS-1 (Kiseki); PRISM (Hitomi); Sohla-1 (Maido 1); SORUNSAT-1 (Kagayaki); SPRITE-SAT (Raijin)	Success
F16	28 November 2009; 01:21:00	H2A 202	IGS-Optical 3	Success
F17	20 May 2010; 21:58:22	H2A 202	PLANET-C (Akatsuki); IKAROS; UNITEC-1 (Shin'en); Waseda-SAT2; K-Sat (Hayato); Negai☆″	Success
F18	11 September 2010; 11:17:00	H2A 202	QZS-1 (Michibiki)	Success
F19	23 September 2011; 04:36:50	H2A 202	IGS-Optical 4	Success
F20	12 December 2011; 01:21:00	H2A 202	IGS-Radar 3	Success
F21	17 May 2012; 16:39:00	H2A 202	GCOM-W1 (Shizuku); KOMPSAT-3 (Arirang 3); SDS-4; HORYU-2	Success
F22	27 January 2013; 04:40:00	H2A 202	IGS-Radar 4 IGS-Optical 5V	Success
F23	27 February 2014; 18:37:00	H2A 202	GPM-Core; SindaiSat (Ginrei); STARS-II (Gennai); TeikyoSat-3; ITF-1 (Yui); OPUSAT (CosMoz); INVADER; KSAT2	Success
F24	24 May 2014; 03:05:14	H2A 202	ALOS-2 (Daichi 2); RISING-2; UNIFORM-1; SOCRATES; SPROUT	Success
F25	7 October 2014; 05:16:00	H2A 202	Himawari 8	Success
F26	3 December 2014; 04:22:04	H2A 202	Hayabusa2; Shin'en 2 ARTSAT2-DESPATCH; PROCYON	Success
F27	1 February 2015; 01:21:00	H2A 202	IGS-Radar Spare	Success
F28	26 March 2015; 01:21:00	H2A 202	IGS-Optical 5	Success
F29	24 November 2015; 06:50:00	H2A 204	Telstar 12 Vantage	Success
F30	17 February 2016; 08:45:00	H2A 202	ASTRO-H (Hitomi); ChubuSat-2 (Kinshachi 2); ChubuSat-3 (Kinshachi 3); Horyu-4	Success
F30	The Hitomi telescope broke apart 37 days after launch.			
F31	2 November 2016; 06:20:00	H2A 202	Himawari 9	Success
F32	24 January 2017; 07:44:00	H2A 204	DSN-2 (Kirameki 2)	Success
F33	17 March 2017; 01:20:00	H2A 202	IGS-Radar 5	Success
F34	1 June 2017; 00:17:46	H2A 202	QZS-2 (Michibiki 2)	Success
F35	19 August 2017; 05:29:00	H2A 204	QZS-3 (Michibiki 3)	Success
F36	9 October 2017; 22:01:37	H2A 202	QZS-4 (Michibiki 4)	Success
F37	23 December 2017; 01:26:22	H2A 202	GCOM-C (Shikisai); SLATS (Tsubame)	Success
F38	27 February 2018; 04:34:00	H2A 202	IGS-Optical 6	Success
F39	12 June 2018; 04:20:00	H2A 202	IGS-Radar 6	Success
F40	29 October 2018; 04:08:00	H2A 202	GOSAT-2 (Ibuki-2); KhalifaSat; Diwata-2B; Tenkōh; Stars-AO (Aoi); AUTcube2 (Gamacube)	Success
F41	9 February 2020; 01:34:00	H2A 202	IGS-Optical 7	Success
F42	19 July 2020; 21:58:14	H2A 202	Emirates Mars Mission (Hope)	Success
F43	29 November 2020; 07:25:00	H2A 202	JDRS/LUCAS	Success
F44	26 October 2021; 02:19:37	H2A 202	QZS-1R	Success
F45	22 December 2021; 15:32:00	H2A 204	Inmarsat-6 F1	Success
F46	26 January 2023; 01:50:21	H2A 202	IGS-Radar 7	Success
F47	6 September 2023; 23:42:11	H2A 202	XRISM; SLIM	Success
F48	12 January 2024; 04:44:26	H2A 202	IGS-Optical 8	Success
F49	26 September 2024; 05:24:20	H2A 202	IGS-Radar 8	Success
F50	28 June 2025; 16:33:03	H2A 202	GOSAT-GW	Success
F50	Final flight of H-IIA, and H-II family as a whole.			

== See also ==
- Comparison of orbital launchers families
- Comparison of orbital launch systems
- Comparison of retired orbital launch systems
