= FedSat =

Australian scientific research satellite

FedSat (Australia's 'Federation Satellite'; sometimes FedSat 1; COSPAR 2002-056B, SATCAT 27598) was an Australian scientific research satellite launched from Tanegashima Space Center, Japan by a NASDA H-IIA launch vehicle on 14 December 2002 (NASDA is now merged with JAXA). The satellite was developed by the Cooperative Research Centre for Satellite Systems, a cooperative made up of several universities, commercial organisations and government bodies. The ground station was at the Institute for Telecommunications Research, part of the University of South Australia, near Adelaide. From 2005 to 2007, it was operated by the Australian Department of Defence.

== Payloads ==
The satellite had six payloads, as given below:

- Communications Payload: A collection of three components (UHF transponder, Ka-band transponder and base-band processor) used to perform several experiments in satellite communications.
- High Performance Computing Experiment: A reconfigurable computer based on a Xilinx XQR4062 FPGA, the first of its kind to be used in space.
- GPS Payload: A Global Positioning System receiver built by NASA. Conceived especially for ionospheric studies between GPS constellation levels and FedSat orbit.
- NewMag Payload: A magnetometer built by the University of Newcastle, Australia, used to take measurements of the Earth's magnetic field near its poles.
- Star Camera: An experimental star camera built by the University of Stellenbosch, used to determine the position of the satellite in space by analysing images of surrounding stars.
- Compact Disk: A nickel "master" disk "cultural time capsule" with tracks including Paul Kelly's performance of the song he co-wrote with Kev Carmody, "From Little Things, Big Things Grow", and recorded statements from several hundred Australian school children about how they imagined a future Australia and its place in the Asia-Pacific.

The satellite platform, comprising the structural/thermal components, power system, attitude control system, onboard computer and groundlink, was originally developed in the United Kingdom by Space Innovations Limited. It was later completed along with integration of payloads in Canberra, Australia.

== Declared Dead ==
The spacecraft's battery failed in May 2007 and the mission has been terminated, after lasting 18 months longer than expected.
