= SOCRATES (satellite) =

Japanese satellite

- Mission type: Technology demonstrator
- Operator: NICT
- COSPAR ID: 2014-029C
- SATCAT no.: 39768

Spacecraft properties
- Manufacturer: Advanced Engineering Services Co., Ltd.
- Launch mass: 48 kg (106 lb)
- Dimensions: 496 mm × 495 mm × 485 mm (19.5 in × 19.5 in × 19.1 in)
- Power: 120W

Start of mission
- Launch date: 03:05, 24 May 2014 (UTC)
- Rocket: H-IIA 202
- Launch site: Tanegashima, LA-Y

Orbital parameters
- Reference system: Geocentric
- Regime: Sun Synchronous
- Eccentricity: 0.0013
- Perigee altitude: 629.8 km
- Apogee altitude: 647.4 km
- Inclination: 97.9
- Period: 97.5 min

SOCRATES or Space Optical Communications Research Advanced Technology Satellite is a Japanese small satellite launched in 2014. The satellite is purely a technology demonstrator designed by NICT intended to help AES company to gain experience in basic mission control, attitude control and spacecraft communications. Its main experiment is SOTA (Small Optical TrAnsponder), an optical small satellite communications demonstrator. All subsystems of spacecraft are powered by solar cells mounted on spacecraft body and stub wings, with estimated electrical power of 120W BOL degrading to 100W EOL.

== History ==
SOTA was the first lasercom on board a microsatellite, performing a variety of experiments in a compact package of a less than 6 kg. The main one is the 10 Mbit/s links at 1549 nm using coarse and fine-pointing to accurately transmit the 35-mW laser through a 5-cm Cassegrain telescope. Additional capabilities included a B92-like QKD protocol at 800-nm band for the first-time quantum-limited demonstration from space.

NICT carried out the first successful ground measurement of a quantum-limited signal from a satellite in experiments in early August 2016. On 11 July 2017, it announced a successful demonstration of quantum communication between the satellite and the ground, with the results published in the August 2017 issue of Nature Photonics. NICT developed a way to achieve time synchronisation and polarisation reference-frame matching between satellite and ground directly from the quantum key distribution signals, together with a quantum receiver able to detect such weak signals using a 1-metre telescope at the optical ground station. NICT contrasted the 48 kg SOCRATES with the 635 kg quantum satellite launched by the University of Science and Technology of China in August 2016, saying the result showed that satellite quantum communication can be done with small, low-cost satellites that many institutions and companies could use.

== Launch ==
SOCRATES was launched from Tanegashima, Japan, on 24 May 2014 at 03:05:00 UTC by an H-IIA 202.

== See also ==
- 2014 in spaceflight
