= Multi-Functional Transport Satellite =

Series of weather and aviation control satellites

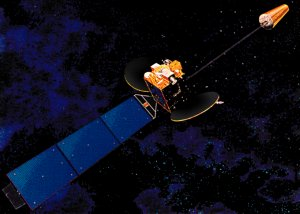
MTSAT-1 Himawari 6

Multifunctional Transport Satellites (MTSAT) were a series of weather and aviation control satellites.

== History ==
They were replaced by Himawari 8 on 7 July 2015. They were geostationary satellites owned and operated by the Japanese Ministry of Land, Infrastructure, Transport and Tourism (MLIT) and the Japan Meteorological Agency (JMA), and provide coverage for the hemisphere centred on 140.0° East; this includes Japan and Australia who are the principal users of the satellite imagery that MTSAT provides. They replace the GMS-5 satellite, also known as Himawari 5 ("himawari" or "ひまわり" meaning "sunflower"). They can provide imagery in five wavelength bands — visible and four infrared, including the water vapour channel. The visible light camera has a resolution of 1 km; the infrared cameras have 4 km (resolution is lower away from the equator at 140° East). The spacecraft have a planned lifespan of five years. MTSAT-1 and 1R were built by Space Systems/Loral. MTSAT-2 was built by Mitsubishi.

== MTSAT-1 and GOES-9 ==
=== Launch failure ===
The launch of MTSAT-1, on a Japanese H-II rocket, failed on 15 November 1999 and the spacecraft was destroyed. GMS-5, the satellite MTSAT-1 was intended to replace, was decommissioned on 1 April 2003 leaving Japan without weather satellite imagery.

=== NOAA loan ===
To fill in the void, the United States National Oceanic and Atmospheric Administration (NOAA) loaned the GOES-9 satellite to the JMA and repositioned it over 155.0° East on 22 May 2003.

== MTSAT-1R ==
MTSAT-1R (also known as Himawari 6) was successfully launched on a H-IIA on 26 February 2005 and became partially operational on 28 June 2005 — the aviation payload was not functional as two MTSATs are required for air traffic control. GOES-9 was decommissioned when MTSAT-1R came online in June 2005.

Its solar sail counteracts the torque produced by sunlight pressure on the solar array. The trim tab on the solar array makes small adjustments to the torque balance.

MTSAT-1R was decommissioned on 4 December 2015, due to fuel limitations.

== MTSAT-2 ==
MTSAT-2 (also known as Himawari 7) successfully launched on 18 February 2006 and is positioned at 145.0° East. The weather functions of MTSAT-2 were put into hibernation until the end of MTSAT-1R's life (5 years from launch). The transportation and communication functions of MTSAT-2 are utilised prior to that time. It was replaced by Himawari 8 on 7 July 2015.

=== Attitude control malfunction ===
On 5 November 2007, Japan Meteorological Agency (JMA) announced a malfunction in the attitude control of MTSAT-2. Attitude control was restored 7 November 2007. The presumed cause of the malfunction was improper functioning of an attitude control thruster. A spare thruster was used to return the spacecraft to normal operation.

== Ground segment ==
Ground stations for both satellites are located in Kobe and Hitachiōta, Ibaraki, Japan.
