= Shizuoka University =

National University in Shizuoka Prefecture, Japan

Coordinates: 34°57′51″N 138°25′55″E

- 静岡大学; Shizuoka Daigaku
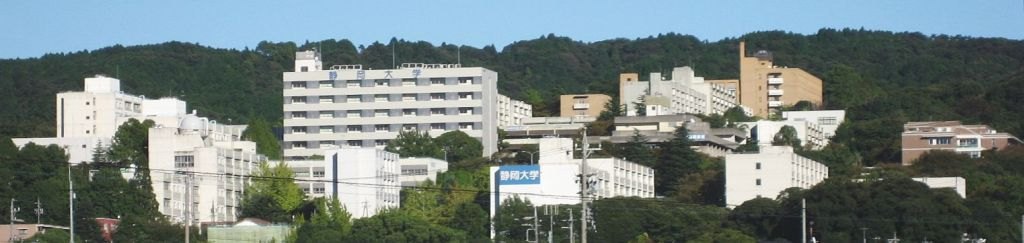
- Motto: Freedom and Enlightenment, Creation of the Future
- Type: National
- Established: 1949
- President: Kazuyuki Hizume
- Location: Shizuoka and Hamamatsu, Shizuoka, Japan
- Campus: Urban
- Mascot: Shizuppi
- Website: www.shizuoka.ac.jp

Shizuoka University (静岡大学, Shizuoka Daigaku; abbreviated to Shizudai (静大)) is a national university in Shizuoka Prefecture, Japan.

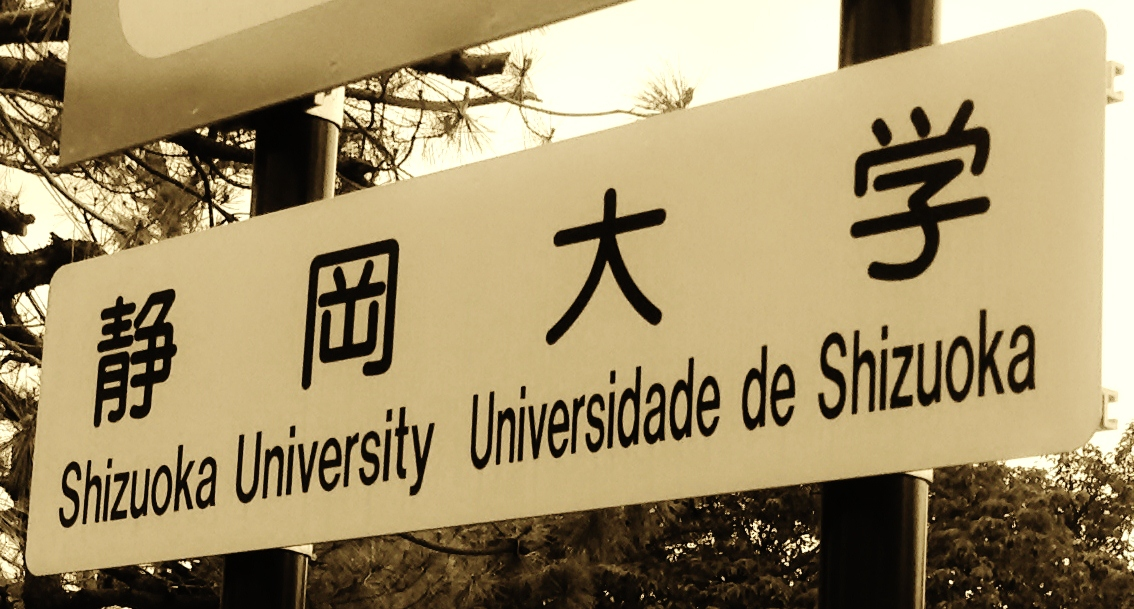
Shizuoka University in Japanese, English and Portuguese

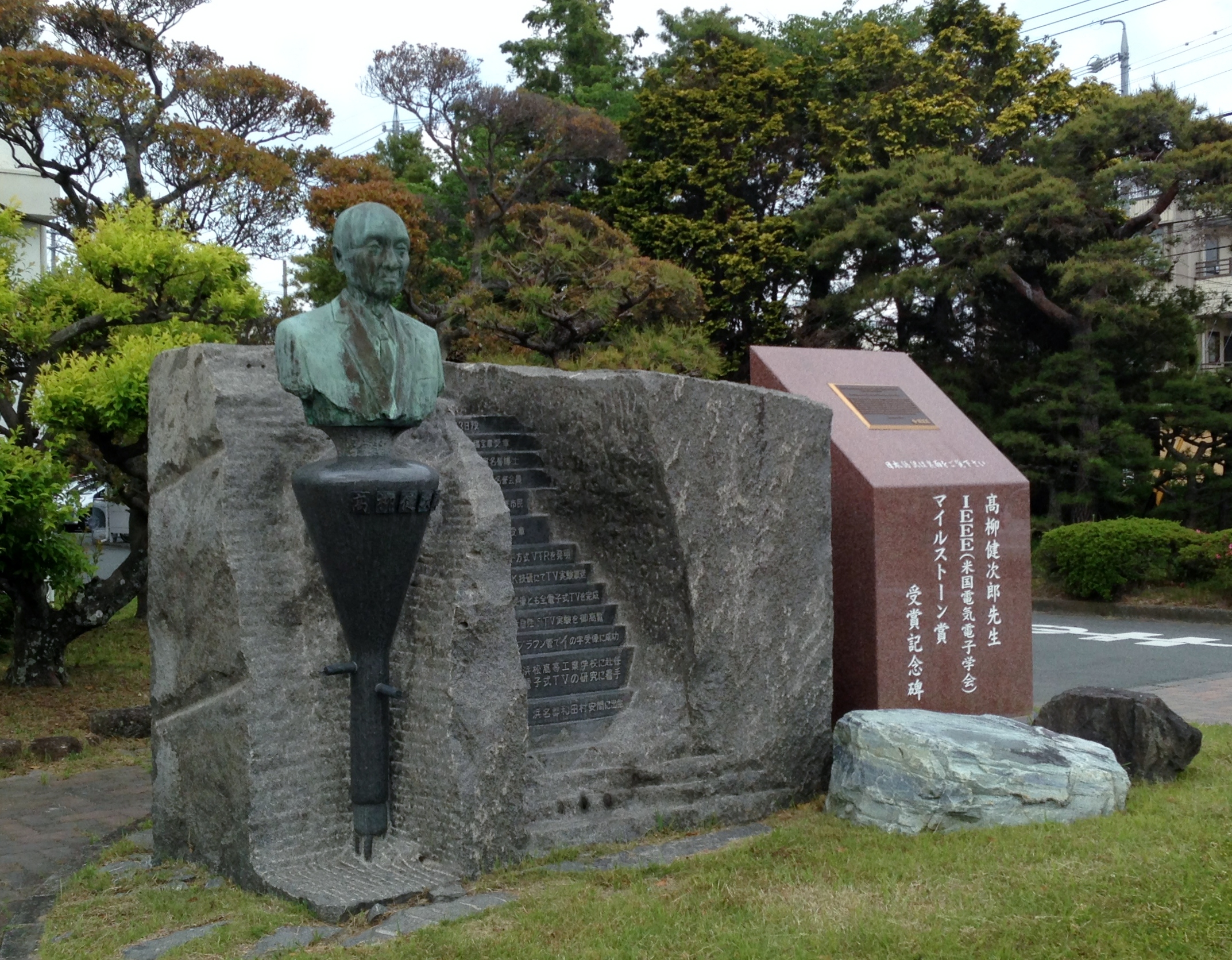
Father of Japanese television, Kenjiro Takayanagi

The university consists of six faculties: Humanities and Social Sciences, Education, Informatics, Science, Engineering, and Agriculture. It consists of two main campuses, in the cities of Shizuoka and Hamamatsu (Engineering and Informatics faculties). National universities in Japan tend to be held in higher regard in higher education than private or prefectural universities. National universities are highly selective in student admissions. The Ministry of Education, Culture, Sports, Science and Technology (MEXT) of the Japanese Government assures quality of higher education in national universities.

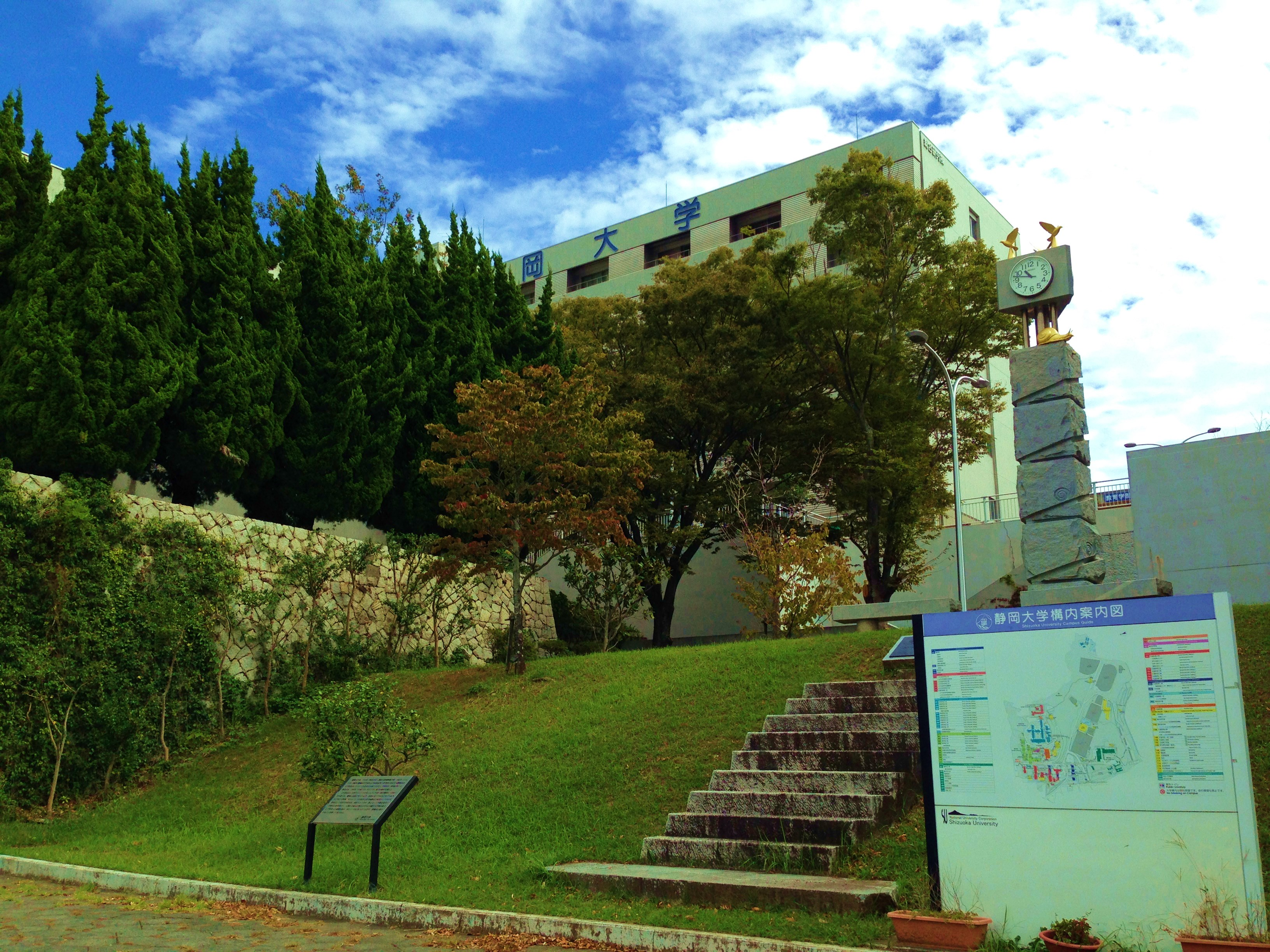
Shizuoka University, Shizuoka Campus

== History ==
The university was founded on May 31, 1949, as an incorporation of several local educational institutions: Shizuoka High School, Shizuoka Teacher Training Institutes I & II, a Young Teacher Training Institute, and Hamamatsu College of Technology. At this initial stage, only the Education and Engineering faculties existed.

In 1951, the Shizuoka Prefectural Agricultural College was amalgamated into the fold, resulting in the creation of a new Agriculture faculty. 1965 brought on a structural rearrangement, combining several smaller schools within other faculties to initiate separate Science and Humanities faculties. With the coming of the digital age in 1995, an Informatics Faculty was added.

In 2006, the university conducted research once more on its internal structure and looked at making large changes including reorganisation of the humanities and education faculties and an increase of student places in the legal graduate school.

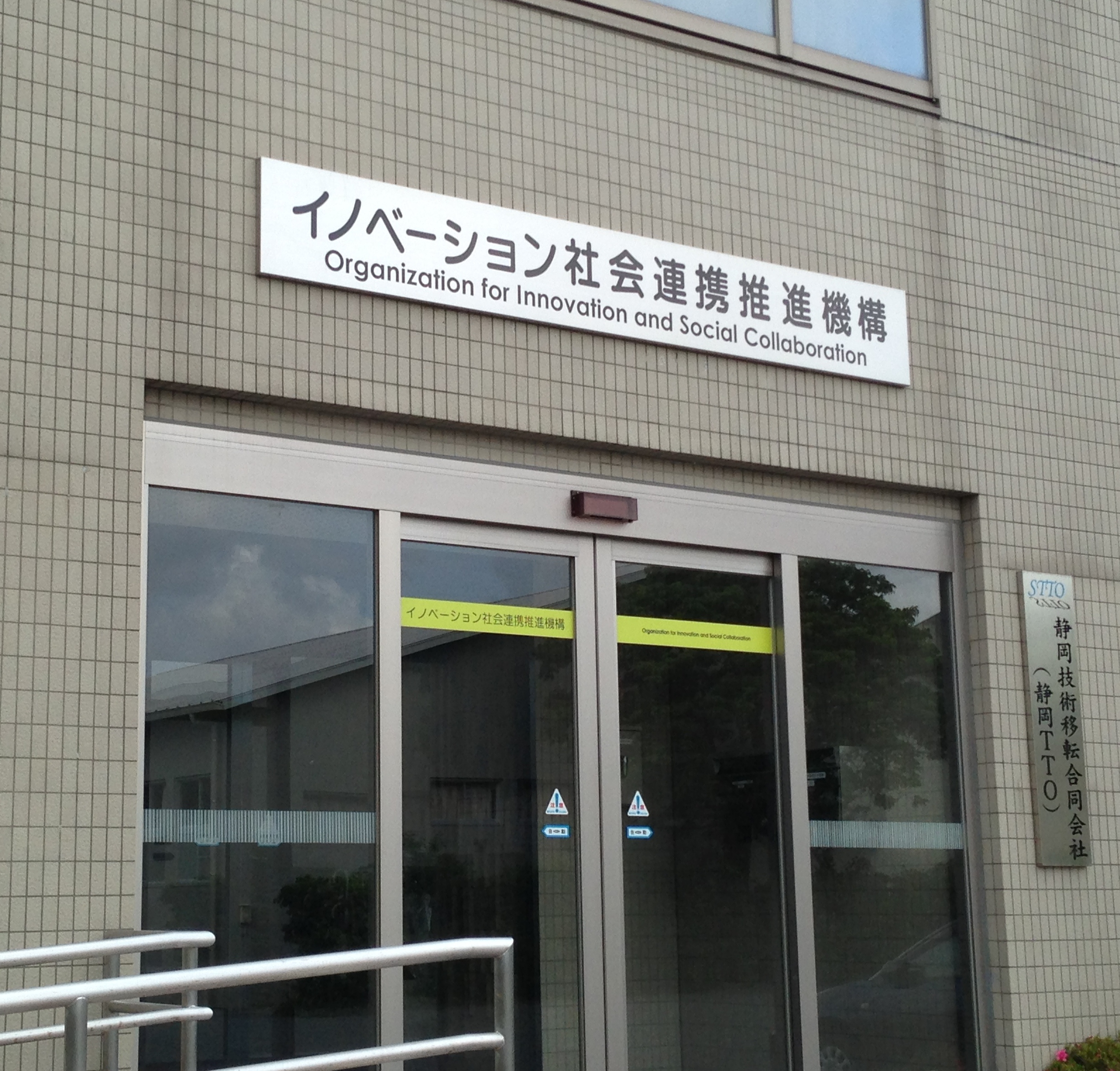
Organization for Innovation and Social Collaboration

== Symbols ==
The campus mascot first appeared on the university's home page in the fall of 2003. To facilitate more active use of this mascot, suggestions for a name were taken, and "Shizuppi" was chosen.

Emblem design and concept:

The emblem design depicts the vast natural stage upon which the university is situated. In the background rises the massive Mt. Fuji and the smaller Mt. Hoei as visible from the university campus, while in the foreground are the billowing waves of the Sea of Enshū and Suruga Bay.

- Mt. Fuji – This signature mountain of Shizuoka Prefecture and Japan as a whole symbolizes lofty dignity and solemnity.
- Billowing waves – The billowing waves of the Sea of Enshū and Suruga Bay represent the ocean, origin of all life, and symbolize ceaseless creation and progress.
- Circular form – The circular form of the emblem symbolizes the hope for harmonious human and academic progress within a bountiful natural environment.

== Faculties ==
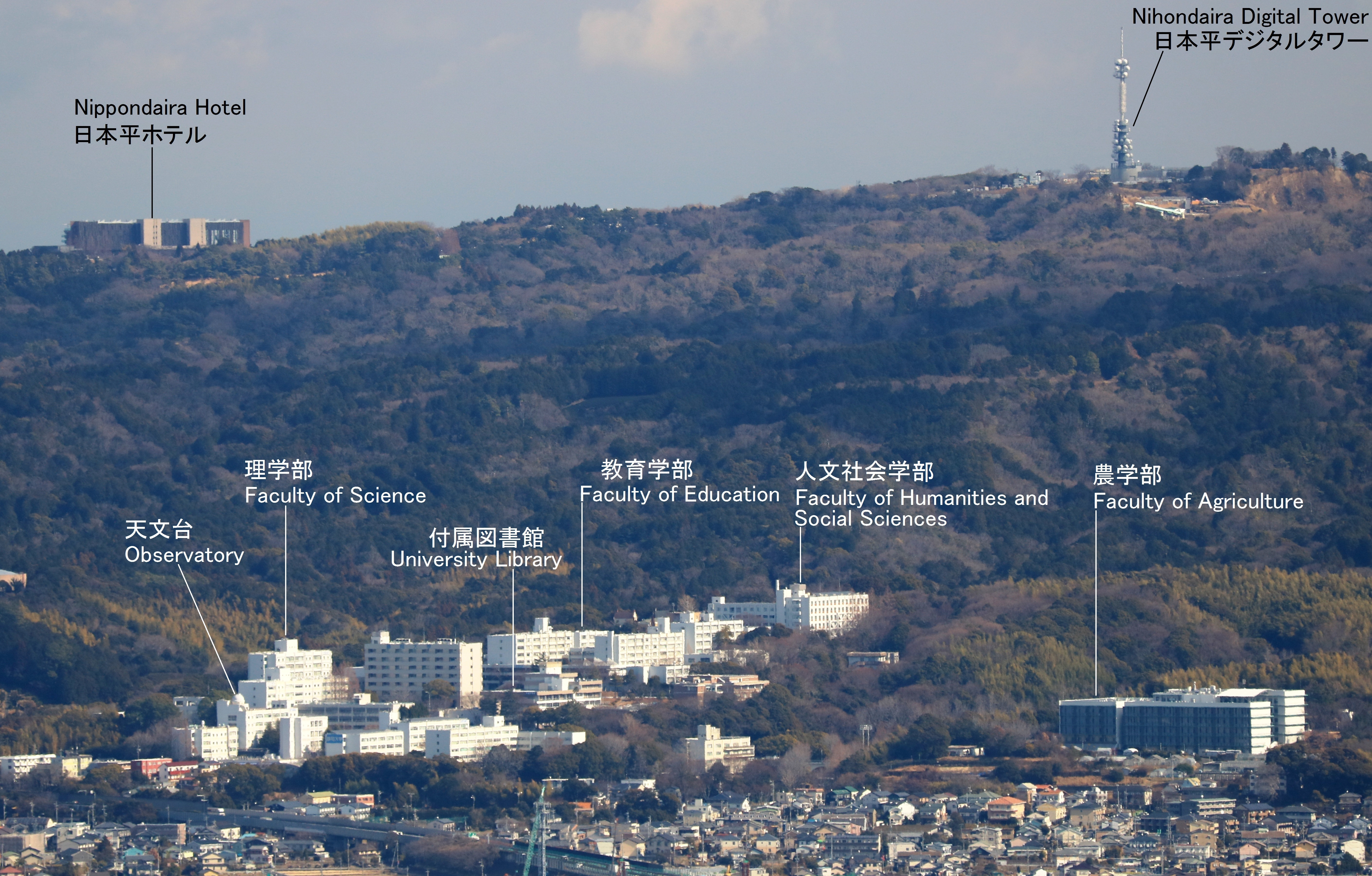
Shizuoka Campus and Nihondaira Faculty of Humanities and Social Sciences Faculty of Education Faculty of Sciences Faculty of Agriculture

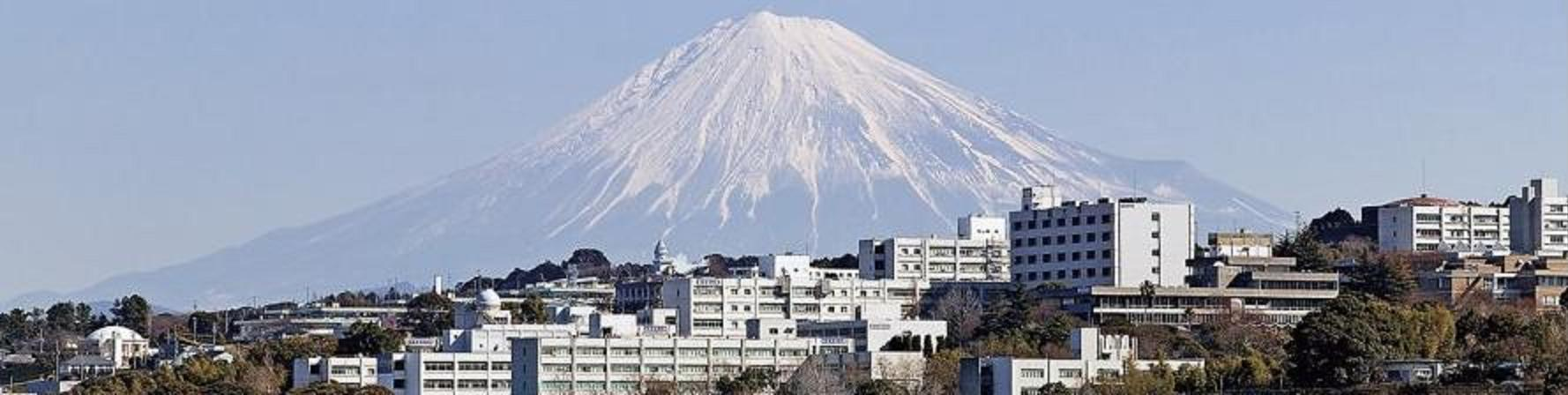
Shizuoka Campus with Mount Fuji as background

- Faculty of Humanities and Social Sciences
  - Department of Social and Human Studies (anthropology, sociology, psychology, cultural anthropology, and history)
  - Department of Language and Literature (Japanese and Asian languages and literature, European and American languages and literature, and comparative linguistics and culture)
  - Department of Law (also has international law, business law, legal science, and politics)
  - Department of Economics (also has corporate economics and political economy)
- Faculty of Education
  - Teacher Training Course
  - Lifelong Education Course
  - Integrated Sciences and Technology Education Course
  - Art and Culture Course
- Faculty of Informatics
  - Department of Computer Science
  - Department of Behavior Informatics
  - Department of Information Arts
- Faculty of Sciences
  - Department of Mathematics
  - Department of Physics
  - Department of Chemistry
  - Department of Biological Science
  - Department of Geo-sciences
- Faculty of Engineering
  - Department of Mechanical Engineering
  - Department of Electrical and Electronic Engineering
  - Department of Electronics and Materials Science
  - Department of Applied Chemistry and Biochemical Engineering
  - Department of Mathematical and Systems Engineering
  - Department of Management of Business Development
  - Center for Creative Engineers
- Faculty of Agriculture
  - Department of Biological and Environmental Science
  - Department of Environment and Forest Resources Science
  - Department of Applied Biological Chemistry

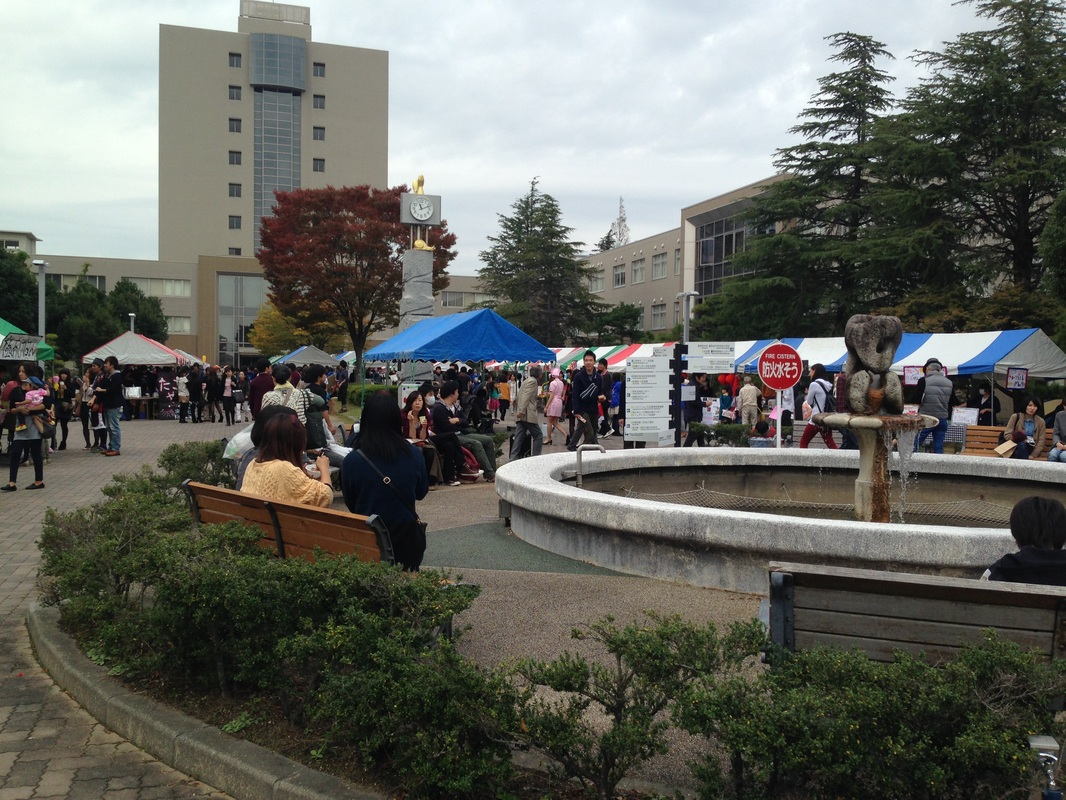
Shizuoka University Hamamatsu Festival

== Graduate school ==
- Graduate School of Humanities and Social Sciences
- Graduate School of Education (with Doctor's Programs and Professional Degree Programs)
- Graduate School of Informatics
- Graduate School of Science
- Graduate School of Engineering
- Graduate School of Agriculture

The Doctoral Course in the United Graduate School of Agricultural Science is co-offered by Gifu University.

- Shizuoka Law School
- Graduate School of Science and Technology (with Doctor's Programs and courses in English)
  - Department of Nanovision Technology
  - Department of Optoelectronics and Nanostructure Science
  - Department of Information Science and Technology
  - Department of Environment and Energy System
  - Department of Bioscience

Shizuoka University offers Double Degree Program through the Inter-Academia Community. The Doctoral Program under the Graduate School of Science and Technology (GSST), in cooperation with European and Asian universities, is designated by Japan's Ministry of Education, Culture, Sports, Science and Technology (MEXT) as part of the International Priority Graduate Programs (PGP) - Advanced Graduate Courses for International Students. GSST has academic agreements with various universities, such as Meiji University.

== Research Institutes ==
- Research Institute of Electronics
  - International Nanovision Research Center
  - Nanodevices and Nanomaterials Division
  - Interdisciplinary Science Division

The Research Institute of Electronics, established in 1965, is the first affiliated scientific research institute of its type to be established by a university under the postwar education system. The Institute receives world-wide recognition for its research activities. In 2004, the Institute launched its Research and Education Center of Nanovision Science as part of the Japan Society for the Promotion of Science's 21st Century Center of Excellence (COE) Program, and is playing a central role in the development of the new nanotechnology-based imaging science. This "Nanovision Science" implies the science as a base for new technology to innovate vision technology based on nanotechnology.

The Institute played an important role in the "Intellectual Cluster in Hamamatsu Region (Optronics Cluster)" project. The results in the Optronics Cluster I were ranked as No. 2, resulting in Shoji Kawahito's receiving the "Award of Ministry of Education, Culture, Sports, Science, and Technology". The Optronics Cluster II has started since 2007. Moreover, Hamamatsu is a famous city where many venture business companies, which the Institute contributed to, were born.

- Research Institute of Green Science and Technology

== Affiliated schools ==
- Shizuoka Elementary School
- Hamamatsu Elementary School
- Shizuoka Junior High School
- Shimada Junior High School
- Hamamatsu Junior High School
- School for students with special needs
- Kindergarten

== Institute for Joint Research and Education ==
- Shizuoka University Education Development Center
- Student Support Center
- Center for Research and Development in Admissions
- International Center
- Institute for Genetic Research and Biotechnology
- Center for Instrumental Analysis
- Center for Information Infrastructure
- Center for Integrated Research and Education of Natural Hazards
- Hamamatsu Campus Center for Instrumental Analysis

Shizuoka University also has a Psychological Service Center which provides mental health-related consultations to the community, and Campus Museum which is utilized to curate and preserve Shizuoka University's research-related materials and to promote their use.

== Campuses ==
=== Shizuoka Campus ===
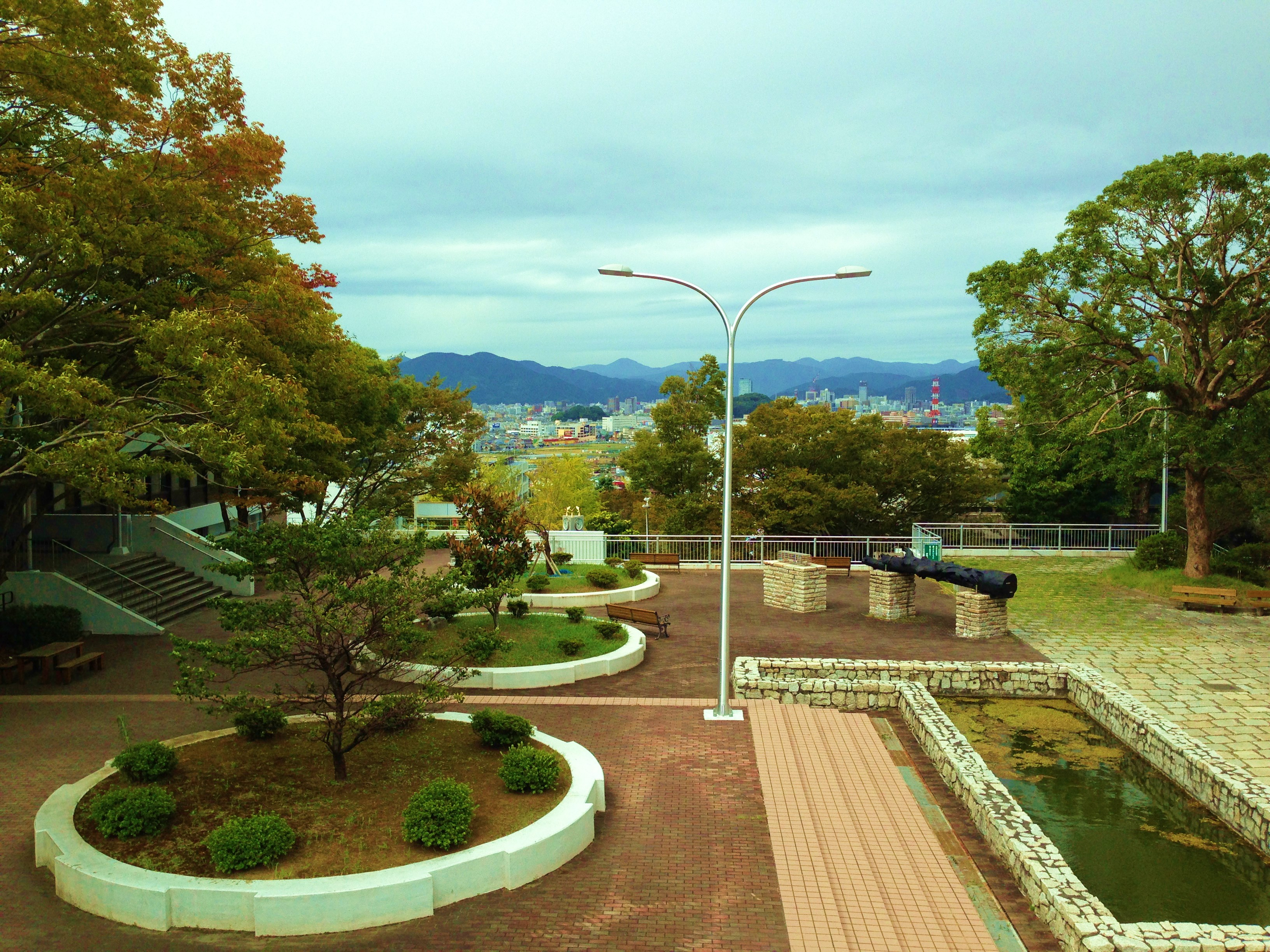
Shizuoka University overlooking Shizuoka City

Address: 836 Ōya, Suruga-ku, Shizuoka City, Shizuoka Prefecture.

Shizuoka campus overlooks Shizuoka City and Suruga Bay.

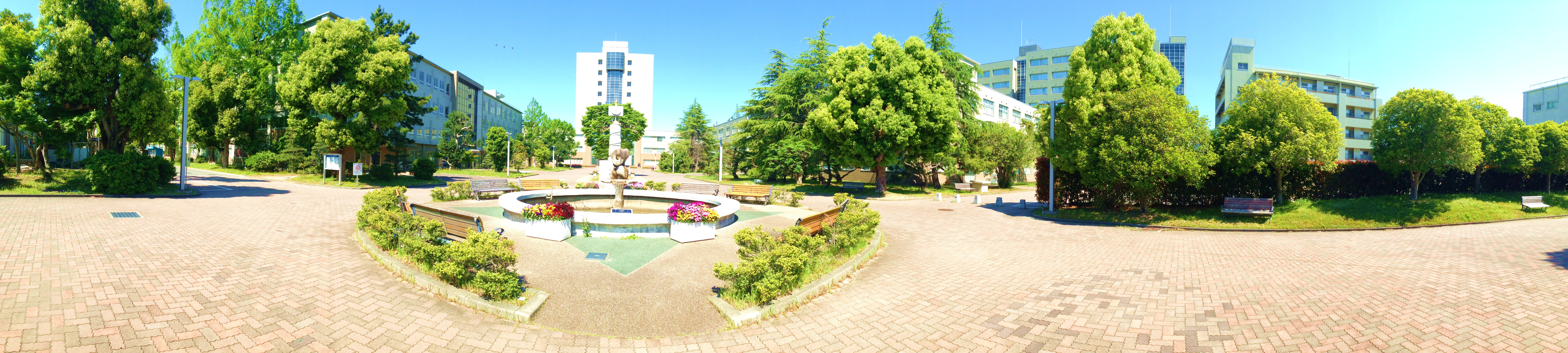
Hamamatsu Campus panorama

=== Hamamatsu Campus ===
Address: 3-5-1 Johoku, Naka-ku, Hamamatsu City, Shizuoka Prefecture.

Shizuoka University's Hamamatsu Campus is situated amid the urban environment of Hamamatsu City, a major center of manufacturing technology.

== Studying in Shizuoka University ==
There are approximately 9,000 students in 6 faculties and 1,600 students in 8 graduate schools in Shizuoka Daigaku (as of May 1, 2010). Various student organizations, circles and clubs are active in the university, such as the Shizuoka University Motors. Shizuoka University also has international residence and dormitories for students.

== See also ==
- University of Shizuoka, a public university in Shizuoka City
