= Kounotori 7 =

2018 Japanese resupply spaceflight to the ISS

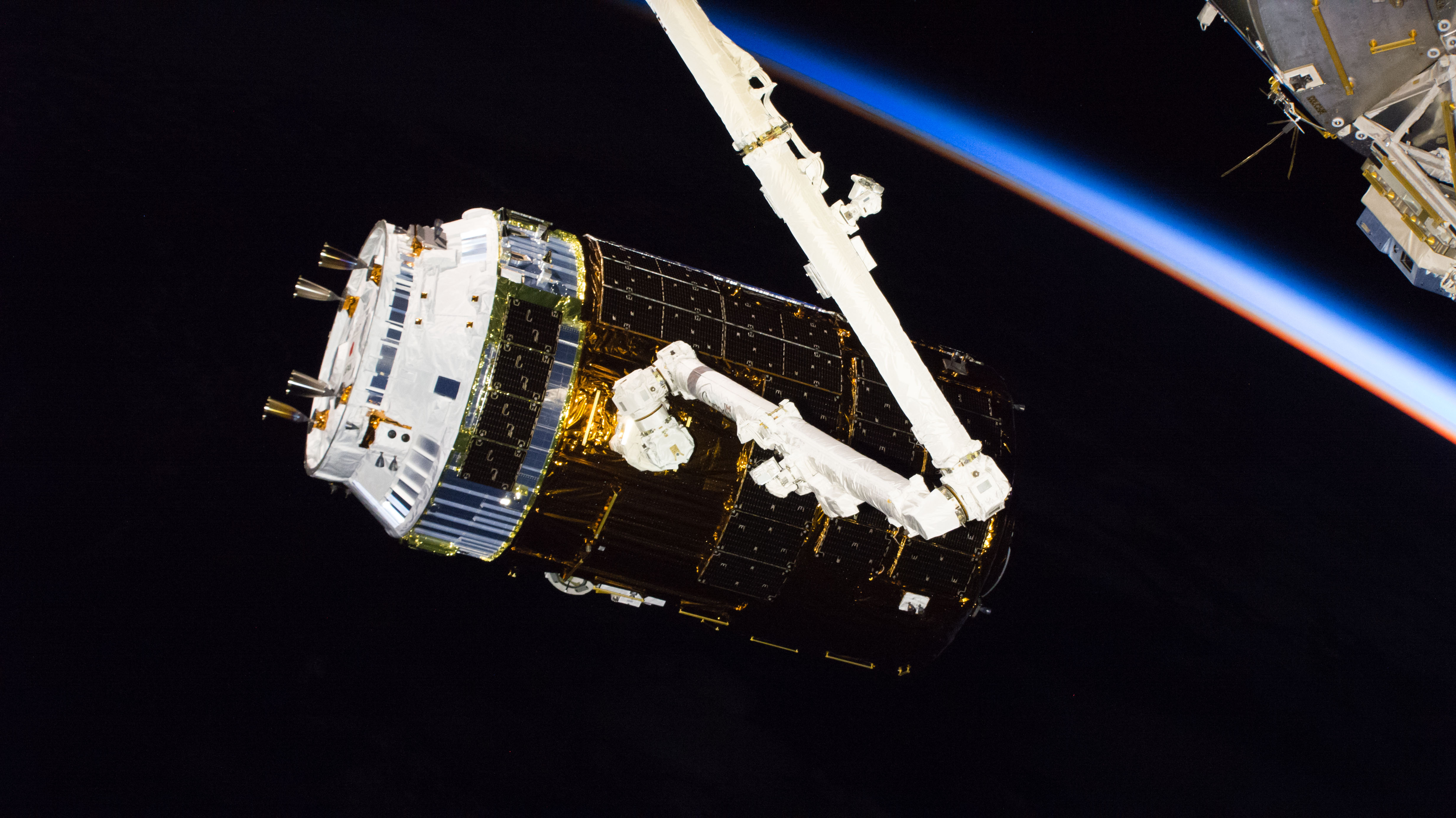
- Kounotori 7 grappled by the robotic arm (Canadarm 2) of the International Space Station.
- Mission type: ISS resupply
- Operator: JAXA
- COSPAR ID: 2018-073A
- SATCAT no.: 43630
- Mission duration: 49 days

Spacecraft properties
- Spacecraft: Kounotori 7
- Spacecraft type: H-II Transfer Vehicle (HTV)
- Manufacturer: Mitsubishi Heavy Industries
- Launch mass: 15700 kg
- Dry mass: 10500 kg
- Payload mass: 5200 kg
- Dimensions: 9.8 metres (32 ft) of long 4.4 metres (14 ft) of diameter

Start of mission
- Launch date: 22 September 2018, 17:52:27 UTC
- Rocket: H-IIB No. 7
- Launch site: Tanegashima, Yoshinobu-2
- Contractor: Mitsubishi Heavy Industries

End of mission
- Disposal: Deorbited
- Decay date: 10 November 2018

Orbital parameters
- Reference system: Geocentric orbit
- Regime: Low Earth orbit
- Inclination: 51.66°

Berthing at ISS
- Berthing port: Harmony nadir
- RMS capture: 27 September 2018, 11:36 UTC
- Berthing date: 27 September 2018, 18:08 UTC
- Unberthing date: 6 November 2018, 23:32 UTC
- RMS release: 7 November 2018, 16:50 UTC
- Time berthed: 41 days

Cargo
- Mass: 4764 kg
- Pressurised: 3397 kg
- Unpressurised: 1367 kg
- Fuel: 705 kg
- Gaseous: 50 kg
- Water: 420 kg

Kounotori 7 (こうのとり7号機), also known as HTV-7, was the seventh flight of the H-II Transfer Vehicle (HTV), an uncrewed cargo spacecraft launched on 22 September 2018 to resupply the International Space Station.

== Spacecraft specification ==
Major changes from previous Kounotori include:

- Inclusion of the HTV Small Re-entry Capsule (HSRC).
- Reduction of primary batteries to five units, down from six on Kounotori 6, and seven on Kounotori 2 through Kounotori 5
- Replacement of Hardware Control Panel (HCP) by Portable Computer System (PCS), a dedicated control command box which allowed ISS crew to send control commands to Kounotori via a portable (laptop) computer.

To enable HSRC retrieval, the destructive re-entry of Kounotori 7 and the splashdown of HSRC was planned to take place in the northwestern Pacific Ocean near Minami-Tori-shima (Marcus Island), east of the Bonin Islands and the Northern Mariana Islands, instead of the South Pacific used by the previous missions.

=== Reentry capsule ===
Along with resupplying the ISS, this Kounotori flight tested the HTV Small Re-entry Capsule (HSRC), a reentry capsule similar in function to the VBK-Raduga carried on board Progress flights to the Mir space station. Essentially a miniaturized HTV-R capsule, it was carried in the pressurized section of the vehicle. After departing from the station, ground control remotely commanded Kounotori to release the capsule at an altitude of 300 kilometres (190 mi). The capsule used a nitrogen cold gas reaction control system with 3D-printed nozzles, and autonomously performs attitude control to mitigate shock during descent. The capsule was recovered by ship after splashing down off the coast of the Ogasawara Islands. It was then airlifted to Ibaraki Airport via Minami-Tori-shima, from where the samples were delivered to researchers. The capsule could contain a total of 20 kilograms of material (5 kilograms if the payload required refrigeration). The capsule had a diameter of 84 cm, a height of 66 cm, and a mass of less than 180 kg. Tiger Corporation developed the capsule's double vacuum insulated container by applying technology used in vacuum flasks. Some samples produced in the microgravity environment of the ISS deteriorate easily, thus a quick return to the surface is desired. For the demonstration flight, samples including ISS-manufactured protein crystals were placed inside.

On 22 October 2015, a high-altitude drop test of the capsule was successfully conducted off the coast of Taiki, Hokkaido. A second test was conducted on 21 September 2016, with conditions and parameters closer to the actual capsule than the previous year's test. The third and fourth drop tests were done in July and November 2017, respectively.

== Cargo ==
Kounotori 7 carried about 6200 kg of cargo, consisting of 4300 kg in the pressurized compartment and 1900 kg in the unpressurized compartment.

Cargo in the pressurized compartment (PLC) included:

- NASA EXPRESS Rack 9B and 10B
- NASA Life Sciences Glovebox (LSG)
- ESA Life Support Rack (LSR)
- JAXA HTV Small Re-entry Capsule (HSRC), and a specifically designed hatch of the pressurized compartment to mount the HSRC on departure from ISS.
- JAXA experiment Loop Heat Pipe Radiator (LHPR)
- CubeSats to be deployed into orbit from ISS: SPATIUM-I, RSP-00, STARS-Me

In the Unpressurized Logistic Carrier (ULC), Kounotori 7 carried 6 lithium-ion batteries Orbital Replacement Units (ORUs) for replacing the ISS's existing nickel-hydrogen batteries. The transportation of replacement batteries was a continuation from the previous Kounotori 6 mission, and continued through to Kounotori 9.

== Operation ==
=== Launch and rendezvous with ISS ===
Initially Kounotori 7 was scheduled to launch at 22:32 UTC on 10 September 2018, but was postponed due to bad weather forecast at a ground tracking station. It was rescheduled to 13 September at 21:20 UTC, but adverse weather forecast at the launch site pushed one day further to 14 September at 20:59:14 UTC.

During the preflight check, a problem was found in the blowoff valve of the launch vehicle second stage oxygen tank, and the launch was scrubbed. After the problem was resolved, the launch was rescheduled to 21 September 2018 at 18:15 UTC. Bad weather forecast pushed it one day to 17:52 UTC on 22 September 2018.

The H-IIB launch vehicle carrying Kounotori 7 launched at 17:52:27 UTC on 22 September 2018. It arrived at the proximity of International Space Station on 27 September 2018, and the station's Space Station Remote Manipulator System (SSRMS) grappled it at 11:36 UTC. Kounotori 7 was berthed to the ISS at 18:08 UTC on 27 September 2018.

=== Operation while berthed to ISS ===
The Exposed Pallet (EP), which carries the replacement batteries for ISS, was extracted from Kounotori's Unpressurized Logistics Carrier (ULC) by the SSRMS (Canadarm2) and transferred to the Mobile Base System (MBS) Payload/Orbital Replacement Unit Accommodations (POA) on 28 September 2018.

Due to the launch failure of Soyuz MS-10, planned extravehicular activity to replace the batteries of ISS could not be performed while the Kounotori 7 was berthed to ISS. The Exposed Pallet remained at the ISS after departure of Kounotori 7.

=== Departure from ISS and reentry to the Earth atmosphere ===
Kounotori 7 was demated from Common Berthing Mechanism (CBM) of Harmony module by SSRMS at 23:32 UTC on 6 November 2018, and it was released into orbit on 7 November 2018, 16:50 UTC. After a series of trajectory control manoeuvres, the final deorbit burn completed at 21:14 UTC, on 10 November 2018.

Separation of HTV Small Re-entry Capsule (HSRC) from Kounotori 7 was confirmed at 21:24 UTC. Estimated time of the reentry to Earth atmosphere (at 120 km altitude) of Kounotori 7 was 21:38 UTC, and the splashdown of residual debris at 21:48 - 22:12 UTC.

Splashdown of HSRC was confirmed at 22:06 UTC, and it was retrieved by the recovery ship at 02:25, on 11 November 2018. The ship arrived at Minami-Tori-Shima on 19:50 UTC, on 12 November 2018. The retrieved specimen was transported by aircraft to Ibaraki Airport, and finally arrived at Tsukuba Space Center on 13 November 2018, at 00:42 UTC.
