= Kounotori 8 =

2019 Japanese resupply spaceflight to the ISS

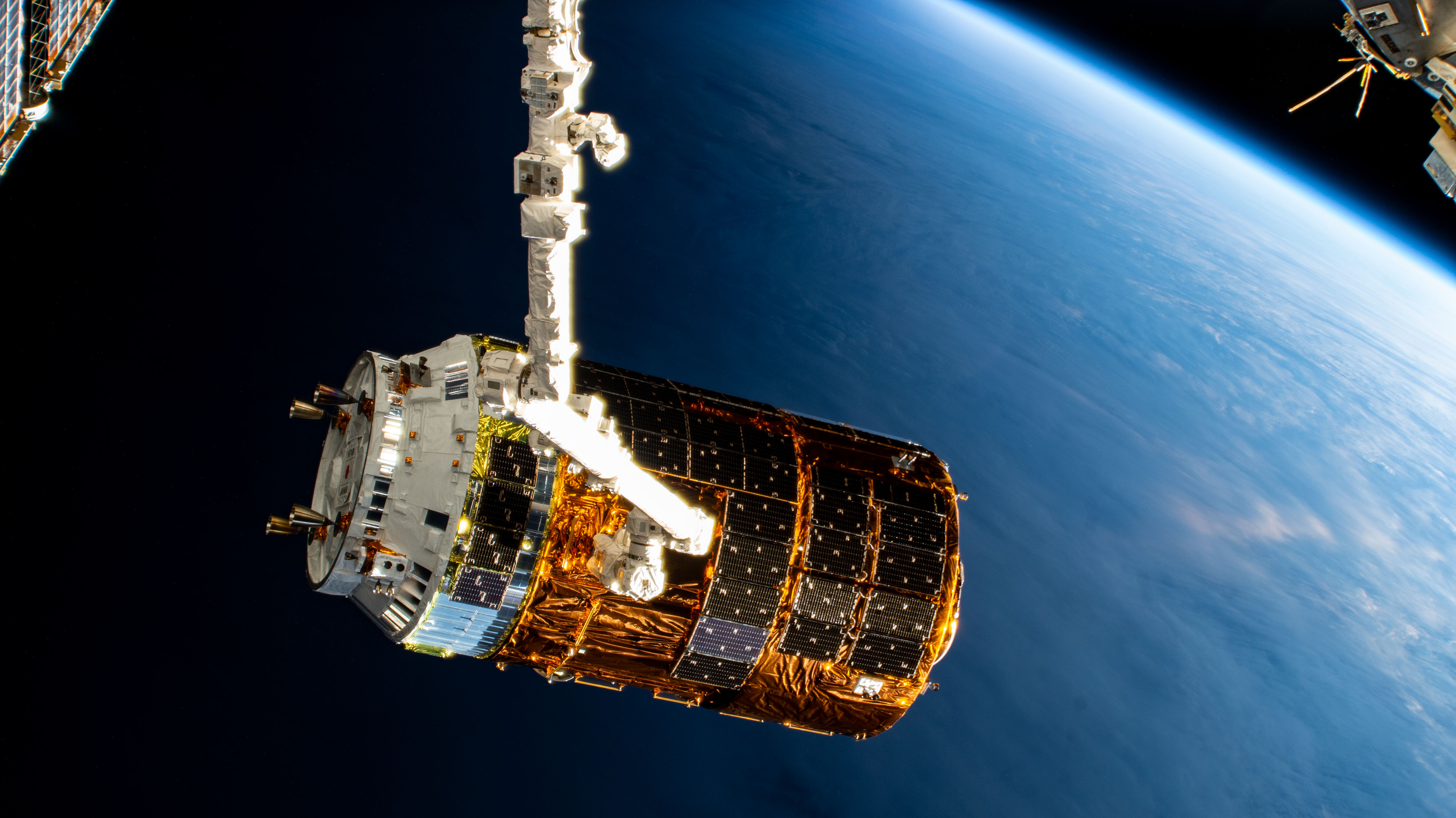
- H-II Transfer Vehicle (HTV-8) being grappled by the Canadarm2 on 1 November 2019.
- Mission type: ISS resupply
- Operator: JAXA
- COSPAR ID: 2019-062A
- SATCAT no.: 44546
- Mission duration: 40 days

Spacecraft properties
- Spacecraft: Kounotori 8
- Spacecraft type: HTV
- Manufacturer: Mitsubishi Heavy Industries
- Launch mass: 15800 kg
- Dry mass: 10500 kg
- Payload mass: 5300 kg
- Dimensions: 9.8 metre of long, 4.4 metre of diameter

Start of mission
- Launch date: 24 September 2019, 16:05:05 UTC
- Rocket: H-IIB No. 8
- Launch site: Tanegashima, Yoshinobu-2
- Contractor: Mitsubishi Heavy Industries

End of mission
- Disposal: Deorbited
- Decay date: 3 November 2019

Orbital parameters
- Reference system: Geocentric orbit
- Regime: Low Earth orbit
- Inclination: 51.66°

Berthing at ISS
- Berthing port: Harmony nadir
- RMS capture: 28 September 2019, 11:12 UTC
- Berthing date: 28 September 2019, 14:09 UTC
- Unberthing date: 1 November 2019, 13:45 UTC
- RMS release: 1 November 2019, 17:21 UTC
- Time berthed: 34 days

Cargo
- Mass: 5300 kg
- Pressurised: 3400 kg
- Unpressurised: 1900 kg

Kounotori 8 (こうのとり8号機), also known as HTV-8, was the 8th flight of the H-II Transfer Vehicle, a robotic cargo spacecraft to resupply the International Space Station. It was launched on 24 September 2019, 16:05:05 UTC.

== Spacecraft ==
Major changes from previous Kounotori are:

- Replacement of Earth sensor with star tracker for spacecraft attitude control
- New cargo racks developed for HTV-X which allows 30% more Cargo Transfer Bags (CTB) to be carried in the Pressurized Logistics Carrier (PLC). (316 CTBs for Kounotori 8, compared to 248 CTBs of Kounotori 6)

== Cargo ==
Kounotori 8 carries about 5300 kg of cargo, consisting of 3400 kg in the pressurized compartment and 1900 kg in the unpressurized compartment.

Cargo in the Pressurized Logistics Carrier (PLC) include:

- JAXA experiment Cell Biology Experiment Facility-Left (CBEF-L)
- JAXA experiment Sony Optical Link for ISS (SOLISS), a satellite optical communication demonstration co-developed with Sony Computer Science Laboratories
- JAXA experiment Hourglass, which will investigate the behavior of soil and rock particles under low gravity conditions
- Gas bottle for JAXA experiment
- Experiment materials for Electrostatic Levitation Furnace (ELF)
- CubeSats to be deployed from ISS: NARSSCube-1, AQT-D, RWASAT-1
- NASA system supply cargo: new water tank for Water Storage System (WSS)
- NASA system supply cargo: tank for Nitrogen Oxygen Recharge System (NORS)

In the Unpressurized Logistics Carrier (ULC), Kounotori 8 carries six lithium-ion batteries Orbital Replacement Units (ORUs) for replacing the ISS's existing nickel-hydrogen batteries. The transportation of replacement batteries is a continuation from the previous Kounotori 6 and 7, and will continue through to Kounotori 9.

== Operation ==
=== Launch ===
The H-IIB launch vehicle carrying Kounotori 8 was initially scheduled to be launched at 21:33:29 UTC, 10 September 2019. During launch preparation, a fire broke out at the launch pad at around 18:05 UTC (T minus 3.5 hours), and the launch was called off. The cause of fire was attributed to the static electricity on the heat resistant material under the mixture of liquid oxygen and gas oxygen for the engine pre-cooling.

After the modification to the mobile launch platform to suppress static electricity, a new launch was scheduled at 23 September 2019, 16:30 UTC, but the collision avoidance check revealed that the 2nd stage of the launch vehicle might approach near the Soyuz MS-15 which was scheduled to be launched on 25 September 2019. A revised launch schedule was set for 16:05 UTC, 24 September 2019. On 24 September 2019, 16:05:05 UTC, the Kounotori 8 aboard H-IIB was launched successfully.

=== Operation while berthed to the ISS ===
Kounotori 8 was captured by the Space Station Remote Manipulator System (SSRMS) at 23:13 UTC, on 27 September 2019, and berthed at Harmony's nadir Common Berthing Mechanism (CBM) by 17:55 UTC, on 28 September 2019.

The External Palette (EP8), which carries the lithium-ion battery Orbital Replacement Units (ORU), was extracted from the Kounotori 8's Unpressurized Logistics Carrier (ULC) by the SSRMS (Canadarm2) on 29 September 2019.

The External Palette of Kounotori 7 (EP7) was placed in the Kounotori 8's ULC. EP7 was left on the ISS after the departure of Kounotori 7 due to the schedule change of extravehicular activity after the launch failure of Soyuz MS-10.

=== Departure and reentry to the Earth atmosphere ===
On 1 November 2019, Kounotori 8 was detached from Harmony's CBM by the SSRMS (Canadarm2), and it was released into orbit at 17:20 UTC.

It was disposed by the destructive reentry to the Earth atmosphere at around 02:09 UTC, on 3 November 2019.
