= Kounotori 9 =

2020 Japanese resupply spaceflight to the ISS

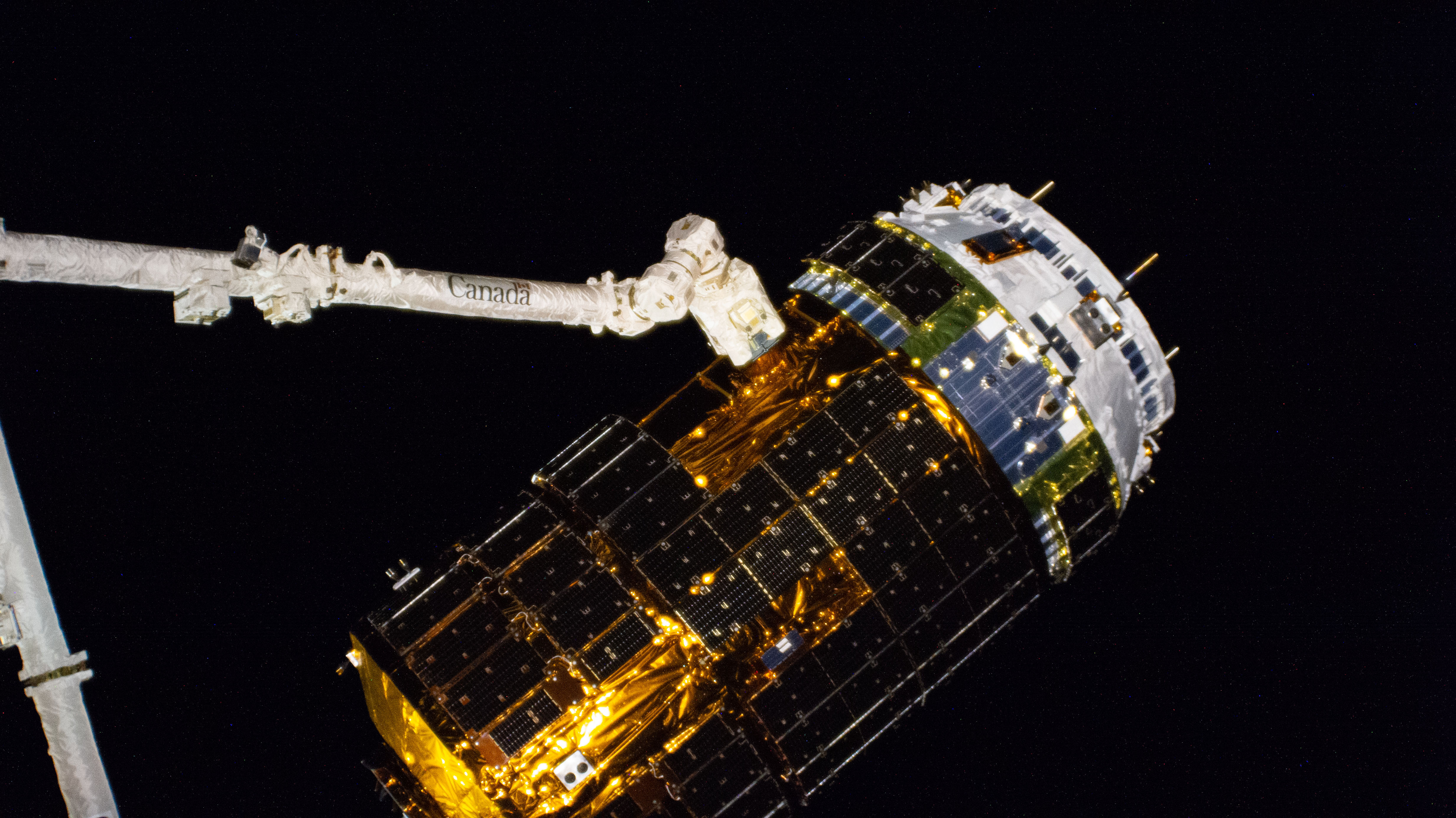
- HTV-9 captured by the Canadarm2 on 25 May 2020
- Mission type: ISS resupply
- Operator: JAXA
- COSPAR ID: 2020-030A
- SATCAT no.: 45607
- Mission duration: 91 days, 13 hours, 36 minutes

Spacecraft properties
- Spacecraft: Kounotori 9
- Spacecraft type: H-II Transfer Vehicle
- Manufacturer: Mitsubishi Heavy Industries
- Launch mass: 16,500 kg (36,400 lb)
- Payload mass: 6,200 kg (13,700 lb)
- Dimensions: Length: 9.8 m (32 ft); Diameter: 4.4 m (14 ft)

Start of mission
- Launch date: 20 May 2020, 17:31:00 UTC
- Rocket: H-IIB, Flight 9
- Launch site: Tanegashima, LA-Y2
- Contractor: Mitsubishi Heavy Industries

End of mission
- Disposal: Deorbited
- Decay date: 20 August 2020, 07:07 UTC

Orbital parameters
- Reference system: Geocentric orbit
- Regime: Low Earth orbit
- Inclination: 51.66°
- Epoch: 20 May 2020

Berthing at ISS
- Berthing port: Harmony nadir
- RMS capture: 25 May 2020, 12:13 UTC
- Berthing date: 25 May 2020, 14:46 UTC
- Unberthing date: 18 August 2020, 13:51 UTC
- RMS release: 18 August 2020, 17:36 UTC
- Time berthed: 84 days, 23 hours, 5 minutes

Cargo
- Mass: 6,200 kg (13,700 lb)
- Pressurised: 4,300 kg (9,500 lb)
- Unpressurised: 1,900 kg (4,200 lb)

Kounotori 9 (Japanese: こうのとり9号機), also known as HTV-9, was the 9th and final flight of the H-II Transfer Vehicle, a robotic cargo spacecraft to resupply the International Space Station (ISS). It was launched on 20 May 2020, at 17:31:00 UTC. Kounotori 9 is the last HTV of the original model, with following missions replaced with the HTV-X.

== Spacecraft ==
Major difference from the previous Kounotori are:

- Camera assembly unit and Wireless LAN communication unit (WLD), described below.

=== Wireless LAN Demonstration ===
Wireless LAN Demonstration, or WLD (pronounced wild) is an experiment that will be performed during Kounotori 9's flight. During the test, a video taken by Kounotori 9 will be broadcast in real time on board the space station, via a wireless LAN (WLAN) datalink. The experiment will be conducting during Kounotori 9's approach, departure, and while berthed to the ISS. For WLD, the spacecraft has a camera attached to its propulsion module, while a data processor and WLAN antenna is located at the Unpressurized Logistics Carrier's aperture. The technology to be tested by WLD will enable ISS crews to monitor approaching vehicles during an autonomous docking. According to JAXA, if successful this will be the first time for two spacecraft to communicate using WLAN during a rendezvous.

== Cargo ==
Kounotori 9 carried about 6,200 kilograms (13,700 lb) of cargo mass, consisting of 4,300 kilograms (9,500 lb) in the pressurized compartment and 1,900 kilograms (4,200 lb) in the unpressurized compartment. In addition to food items and crew commodities, the pressurized compartment (Pressurized Logistics Carrier; PLC)'s cargo consists of:

- JAXA cargo:
  - Solid Combustion Experiment Module (SCEM)
  - Integrated Standard Imager for Microsatellites (iSIM), a commercial technology demonstration payload by Satlantis
  - Equipment for the space media business collaboration (Space Frontier Studio KIBO)
  - Confocal Space Microscopy (COSMIC)
- NASA cargo:
  - EXPRESS Rack 11B (ER11B)
  - Tank for Water Storage System (WSS)
  - High-pressure nitrogen tank for Nitrogen Oxygen Recharge System (NORS)
- ESA cargo:
  - European Drawer Rack Mark II (EDR2)

Cargo in the unpressurized compartment (Unpressurized Logistics Carrier, ULC) was the Exposed Pallet (EP9) which carries the six lithium-ion batteries Orbital Replacement Units (ORUs) for replacing the ISS's existing nickel-hydrogen batteries. This was the last of the series of transportation of replacement batteries, following the previous Kounotori 6, Kounotori 7, and Kounotori 8.

On departure from ISS, Kounotori 9 was loaded with the Exposed Pallet of Kounotori 8 (EP8) carrying the replaced nickel-hydrogen batteries. It was left on ISS due to the missed extravehicular activity during the Kounotori 7 mission for the launch failure of Soyuz MS-10 in 2018. The Exposed Pallet of Kounotori 9 (EP9) was left on ISS, and subsequently, it was disposed of by jettisoning into orbit on 11 March 2021 using the Canadarm2, carrying old nickel-hydrogen batteries.

The Exposed Pallet of Kounotori 9 (EP9) reentered to Earth atmosphere on 8 March 2024. An object from this cargo survived the reentry, damaged a house in Naples, Florida.

== Operations ==
=== Launch ===
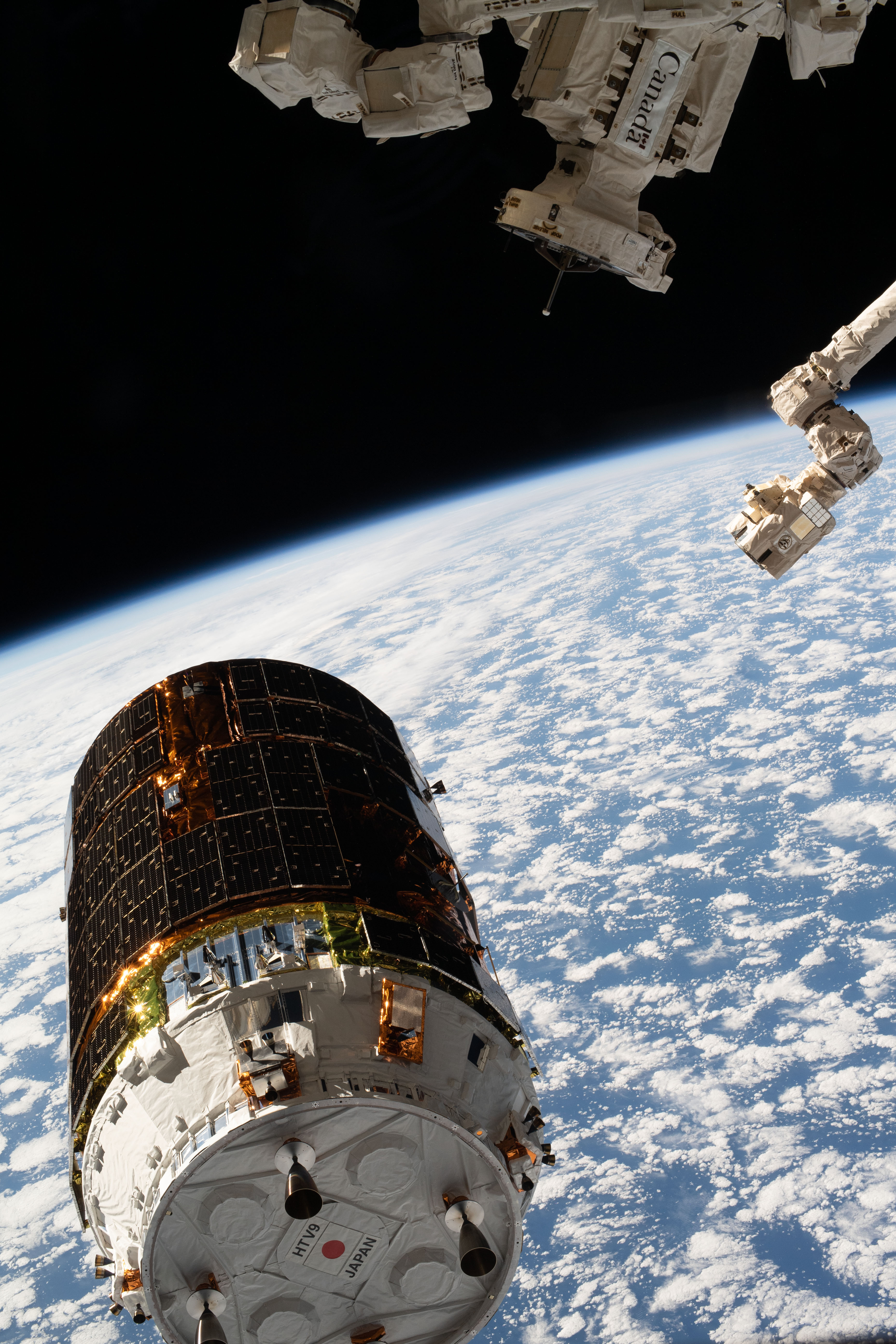
Kounotori 9 in proximity of ISS to be captured by the Canadarm2

Kounotori 9 was launched aboard the ninth and final launch of H-IIB rocket on 20 May 2020, at 17:31:00 UTC. The launch took place amid the COVID-19 pandemic, so that the usual launch viewing places were closed to spectators, and the local town offices requested not to visit for launch observation.

After the successful launch, the Kounotori 9 arrived to the proximity of the International Space Station on 25 May 2020, and it was captured by Canadarm2 at 12:13 UTC. It was mated to the Harmony's Common Berthing Mechanism (CBM). Berthing operation completed at 18:25 UTC.

=== Operation while berthed to ISS ===
ISS crew opened the hatch of the Kounotori's PLC, and entered at 19:24 UTC. Cargo transfer of the pressurized cargo by the crew began on 26 May 2020.

Exposed Pallet (EP9), which carries lithium-ion batteries, was extracted from the ULC by the ground-operated Canadarm2 on 1 June 2020. Then, Kounotori 8's Exposed Pallet (EP8), carrying old nickel-hydrogen batteries, was stowed into the ULC on 02:48 UTC, 2 June 2020.

=== Departure and reentry to the Earth atmosphere ===
On 18 August 2020, Kounotori 9 was detached from Harmony's CBM by the Canadarm2, and it was released into orbit at 17:36 UTC. It was disposed by the destructive reentry to the Earth atmosphere at around 07:07 UTC, on 20 August 2020.
