= GOMX-3 =

European Space Agency's first technology demonstration CubeSat

- Mission type: Technology demonstration
- Operator: European Space Agency
- COSPAR ID: 1998-067HA
- SATCAT no.: 40949

Spacecraft properties
- Spacecraft type: 3U CubeSat
- Manufacturer: (Denmark) GomSpace

Start of mission
- Launch date: 19 August 2015, 11:50:49 UTC
- Rocket: H-IIB with Kounotori 5
- Launch site: Yoshinobu Launch Complex
- Deployed from: ISS
- Deployment date: 5 October 2015

End of mission
- Decay date: 18 October 2016

GOMX-3 was a technology demonstration CubeSat operated by the European Space Agency (ESA) and the Danish company GomSpace in low Earth orbit between 2015 and 2016. It was ESA's first in-orbit demonstration CubeSat. After being deployed from the ISS on 5 October 2015, it successfully tested various miniaturised communication technologies.

== See also ==
- List of European Space Agency programmes and missions
