= Kounotori 5 =

2015 Japanese resupply spaceflight to the ISS

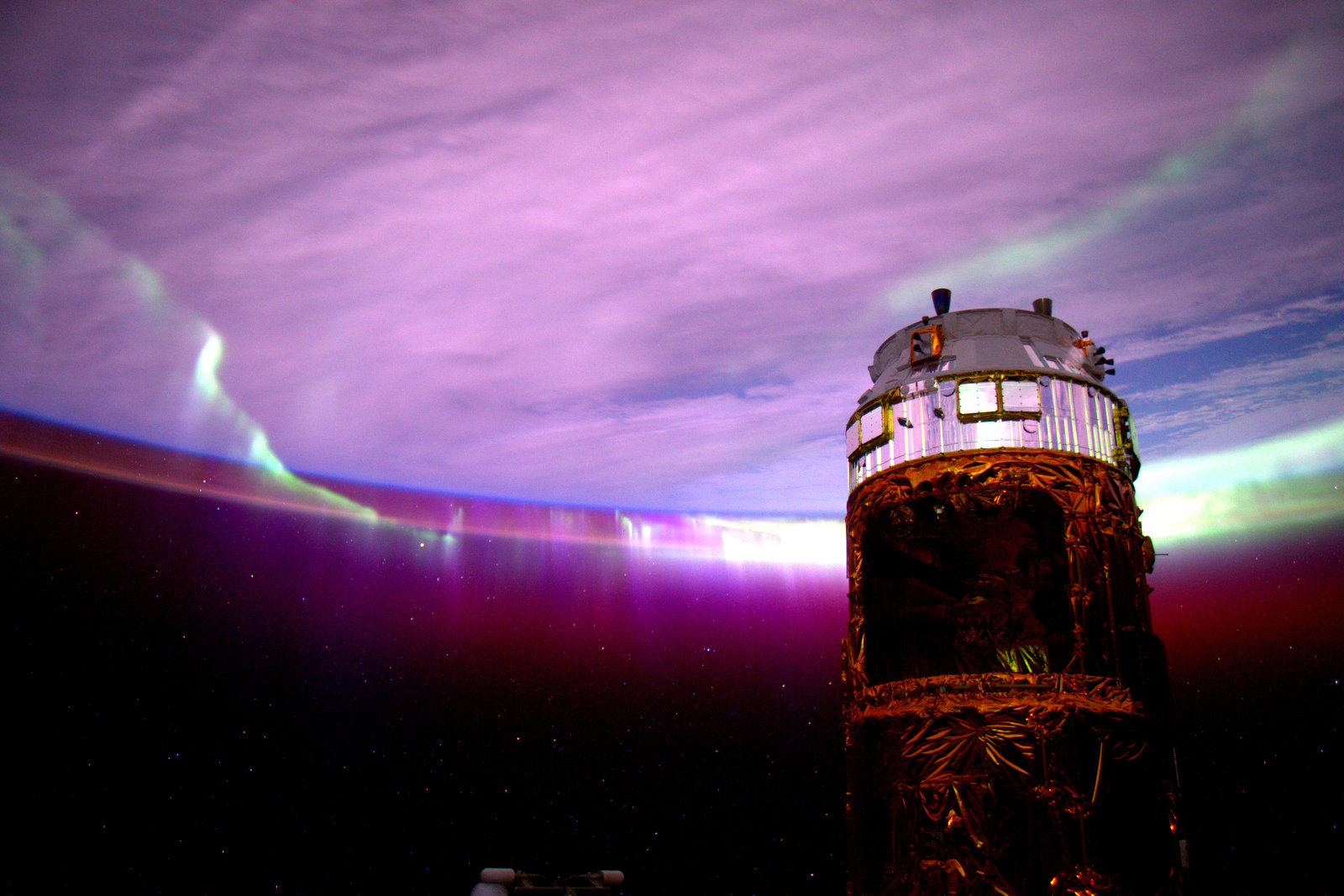
- A view of the docked Kounotori 5 spacecraft from the Cupola, with Aurora Australis in the background.
- Mission type: ISS resupply
- Operator: JAXA
- COSPAR ID: 2015-038A
- SATCAT no.: 40873
- Mission duration: 41 days

Spacecraft properties
- Spacecraft type: H-II Transfer Vehicle (HTV)
- Manufacturer: Mitsubishi Heavy Industries
- Launch mass: 16557 kg
- Dry mass: 10500 kg

Start of mission
- Launch date: 19 August 2015, 11:50:49 UTC
- Rocket: H-IIB No. 5
- Launch site: Tanegashima, Yoshinobu-2
- Contractor: Mitsubishi Heavy Industries

End of mission
- Disposal: Deorbited
- Decay date: 29 September 2015, 20:33 UTC

Orbital parameters
- Reference system: Geocentric orbit
- Regime: Low Earth orbit
- Inclination: 51.66°

Berthing at ISS
- Berthing port: Harmony
- RMS capture: 24 August 2015, 10:28 UTC
- Berthing date: 24 August 2015, 17:28 UTC
- Unberthing date: 28 September 2015, 11:12 UTC
- RMS release: 28 September 2015, 16:53 UTC
- Time berthed: 34 days, 23 hours, 25 minutes

Cargo
- Mass: 6057 kg
- Pressurised: 4557 kg
- Unpressurised: 1500 kg

Kounotori 5, also known as HTV-5, was the fifth flight of the H-II Transfer Vehicle, an uncrewed cargo spacecraft launched to resupply the International Space Station. It was launched on 19 August 2015.

== Specifications ==
Major changes of Kounotori 5 from previous Kounotori are:

- Solar panels were reduced to 49 panels, down from 57 on HTV-1 and Kounotori 2, 56 on Kounotori 3, and 55 on Kounotori 4, since the analysis of the data from previous missions showed that fewer panels were sufficient. A sensor-mount outlet was added since Kounotori 4 at a place previously occupied by a solar panel, and on Kounotori 5 it is used to attach environment measurement equipment (Kounotori Advanced Space Environment Research equipment (KASPER)).
- Improvement in the loading of Cargo Transfer Bags allows for increased capacity (maximum 242 CTBs compared to previous 230), and more late access cargo (maximum 92 CTBs compared to previous 80).

When approaching the ISS, previous missions were held at the Approach Initiation (AI) point at 5 kilometres (3.1 mi) behind the ISS for system checkout, but Kounotori 5 was changed to continue the approach without holding, to simplify the operation.

== Cargo ==
Kounotori 5 was originally planned to carry about 5.5 tonnes (5.4 long tons; 6.1 short tons) of cargo, consisting of 4,500 kilograms (9,900 lb) in the pressurised compartment and 1000 kg in the unpressurised compartment. Due primarily to the launch failure of SpaceX CRS-7, an additional 200 kilograms (440 lb) were added as the late access cargo. Total cargo weight was 6,057 kilograms (13,353 lb).

Pressurised cargo includes: potable water (600 litres (130 imp gal; 160 US gal)), food, crew commodities, system components, and science experiment equipments. System components includes: UPA Fluids Control and Pump Assembly (FCPA), WPA Multifiltration Beds (WFB), a galley rack to be placed in Unity, and a Simplified Aid For EVA Rescue (SAFER) pack. Science experiment equipments include Mouse Habitat Unit (MHU), Electrostatic Levitation Furnace (ELF), Multi-purpose Small Payload Rack (MSPR-2), Exposed Experiment Handrail Attachment Mechanism (ExHAM-2), NanoRacks External Platform (NREP), and CubeSats (SERPENS, S-CUBE, fourteen Flock-2b, AAUSAT5, and GOMX-3).

Unpressurised cargo consists of the Calorimetric Electron Telescope (CALET). Plans for a NASA unpressurised module were canceled.

Upon departure from ISS, the unpressurised cargo bay will carry the Multi-mission Consolidated Equipment (MCE) package, the Superconducting Submillimeter-wave Limb-Emission Sounder (SMILES), and a NASA experiment module, Space Test Program Houston 4 (STP-H4), until its destructive reentry in the Atmosphere of Earth.

== Operation ==
=== Launch and rendezvous with the ISS ===
Kounotori 5 was originally planned for launch in 2014 but was later postponed due to delays in the construction and qualification testing of the payload to fly on the capsule.

In June 2015, it was scheduled to be launched at around 13:01 UTC on 16 August 2015. Due to the bad weather forecast, on 14 August 2015 the launch was postponed to 17 August 2015, and then on 16 August it was postponed again to 19 August 2015.

Kounotori 5 was successfully launched with a H-IIB No. 5 (H-IIB F5) Launch vehicle flying from pad 2 of the Yoshinobu Launch Complex at Tanegashima Space Center at 11:50:49 UTC on 19 August 2015. Communication and three-axis attitude controls were established shortly after the launch. Phase Manoeuvre was performed by 19:25 UTC on 20 August 2015, and the first Height Adjustment Manoeuvre by 17:55 UTC on 22 August 2015. The second and third Height Adjustment Manoeuvre were performed by 03:07 and 06:12 UTC on 24 August 2015, respectively.

The ISS's robotic arm SSRMS grappled Kounotori 5 at 10:29 UTC on 24 August 2015, and fastened it to the ISS's Common Berthing Mechanism (CBM) at 14:58 UTC on 24 August 2015. All berthing operations were completed at 17:28 UTC on 24 August 2015.

=== Operation while berthed to ISS ===
From 02:27 UTC on 25 August 2015, the Exposed Pallet (EP), which is carrying CALET, was extracted from Kounotori 5's Unpressurised Logistics Carrier (ULC) by the ground-controlled SSRMS, and handed off to the Japanese Experiment Module Remote Manipulator System (JEMRMS), which is also remote-controlled from ground. The JEMRMS then attached the palette to the JEM Exposed Facility (EF). Later, at 14:29 UTC on the same day, CALET was removed from the pallet and installed to the Exposed Facility by the JEMRMS.

The ISS crew opened the hatch of the Kounotori's Common Berthing Mechanism and entered to Pressurized Logistics Carrier at 10:24 UTC on 25 August 2015, and began transferring the cargo.

=== Departure from ISS and reentry into the Earth's atmosphere ===
Kounotori 5 was unberthed from the CBM at 11:12 UTC, 28 September 2015 by SSRMS robotic arm and moved to the release position. The first attempt of the release at 15:20 UTC was aborted due to an anomaly of the SSRMS. After one ISS orbit, Kounotori 5 was released from the SSRMS at 16:53 UTC, 28 September 2015, Expedition 45 Flight Engineer Kimiya Yui of JAXA, backed up by NASA Flight Engineer Kjell N. Lindgren, commanded the SSRMS.

After the orbit control manoeuvre, Kounotori 5 reentered Earth's atmosphere over the southern Pacific Ocean around 20:33 UTC, on 29 September 2015.
