= Calorimetric Electron Telescope =

2015 Japanese space observatory

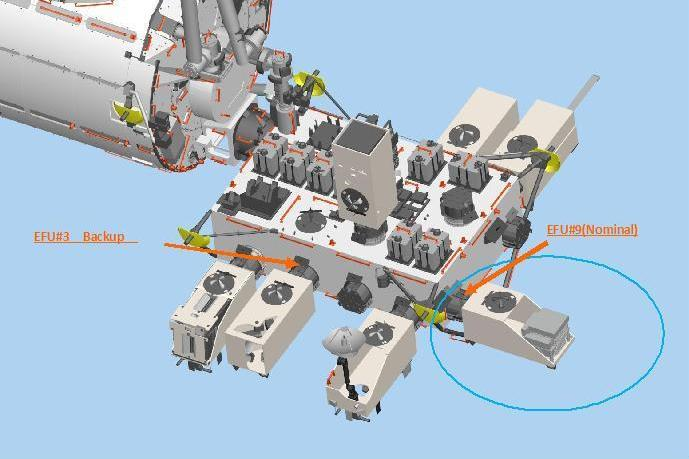
- Alternative names: CALET

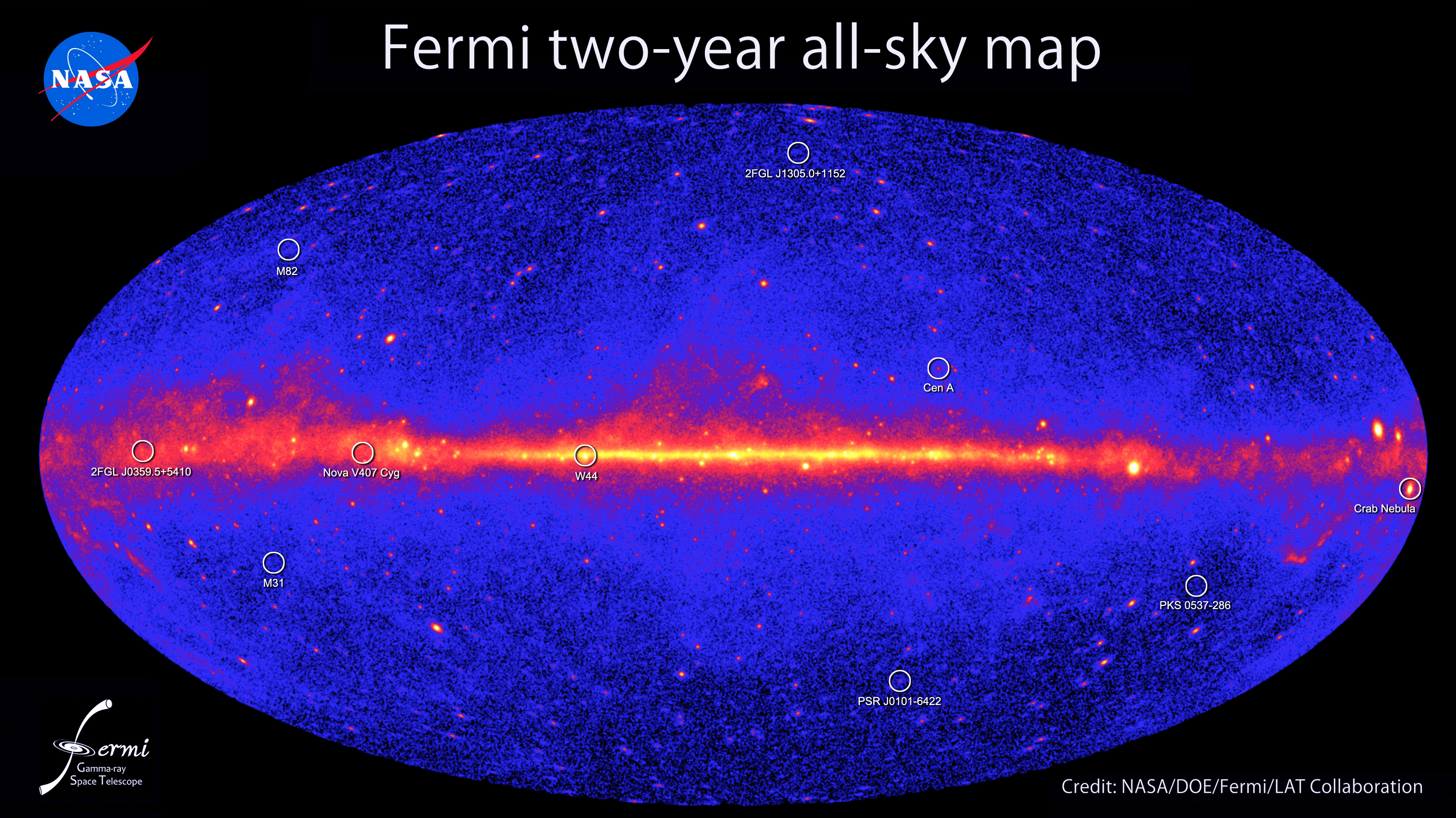
Fermi Telescope's second catalog of gamma ray sources constructed over 2 years. An all sky image showing energies greater than 1 billion electronvolts (1 GeV) ub. Brighter colors indicate gamma-ray sources.

The CALorimetric Electron Telescope (CALET) is a space telescope being mainly used to perform high precision observations of electrons and gamma rays. It tracks the trajectory of electrons, protons, nuclei, and gamma rays and measures their direction, charge and energy, which may help understand the nature of dark matter or nearby sources of high-energy particle acceleration.

The mission was developed and sponsored by the Japan Aerospace Exploration Agency (JAXA), involving teams from Japan, Italy, and the United States. CALET was launched aboard JAXA's H-II Transfer Vehicle Kounotori 5 (HTV-5) on 19 August 2015, and was placed on the International Space Station's Japanese Kibo module.

== Overview ==
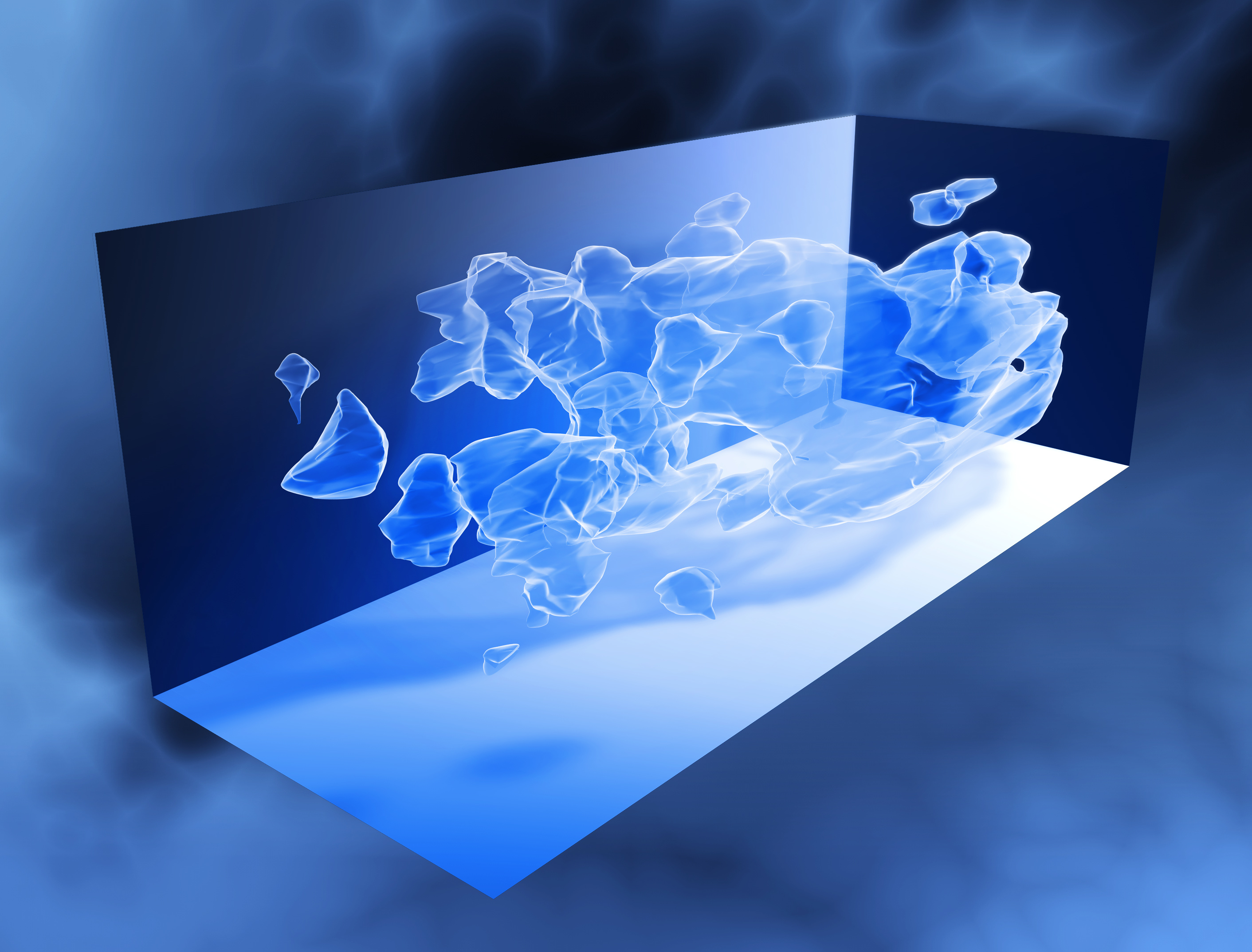
3D map of the large-scale distribution of dark matter, reconstructed from measurements of weak gravitational lensing with the Hubble Space Telescope.

CALET is an astrophysics mission that searches for signatures of dark matter and provides the highest energy direct measurements of the cosmic ray electron spectrum in order to observe discrete sources of high-energy particle acceleration in our local region of the galaxy. The mission was developed and sponsored by the Japan Aerospace Exploration Agency (JAXA), involving teams from Japan, Italy, and the United States. It seeks to understand the mechanisms of particle acceleration and propagation of cosmic rays in our galaxy, to identify their sources of acceleration, their elemental composition as a function of energy, and possibly to unveil the nature of dark matter. Such sources seem to be able to accelerate particles to energies far higher than scientists can achieve on Earth using the largest accelerators. Understanding how nature does this is important to space travel and has possible applications here on Earth. The CALET Principal Investigator is Shoji Torii from the Waseda University, Japan; John Wefel is the co-principal investigator for the US team; Pier S. Marrocchesi, is the co-investigator from the Italy team.

Unlike optical telescopes, CALET operates in a scanning mode. It records each cosmic ray event that enters its field of view and triggers its detectors to take measurements of the cosmic ray in the extremely high energy region of teraelectronvolts (TeV, one trillion electronvolts). These measurements are recorded on the space station and sent to a ground station at Waseda University for analyses. CALET may also yield evidence of rare interactions between matter and dark matter by working in synergy with the Alpha Magnetic Spectrometer (AMS) – also aboard the ISS – that is looking at positrons and antiprotons to identify dark matter. Observations will be carried out more than 5 years.

CALET contains a sub-payload CIRC (Compact Infrared Camera) to observe the Earth's surface in order to detect forest fires.

== Objectives ==
The objectives are to understand the following:

1. origin and mechanisms of acceleration of high-energy cosmic rays and gamma rays
2. propagation mechanism of cosmic rays throughout the Galaxy
3. identity of dark matter

As a cosmic ray observatory, CALET aims to clarify high energy space phenomena and dark matter from two perspectives; one is particle creation and annihilation in the field of particle physics (or nuclear physics) and the other is particle acceleration and propagation in the field of space physics.

== Results ==
CALET first published data on half a million electron and positron cosmic ray events in 2017, finding a spectral index of −3.152 ± 0.016 above 30 GeV.

== See also ==
- List of X-ray space telescopes
