= H-II Transfer Vehicle =

Uncrewed cargo spacecraft developed by JAXA

H-II Transfer Vehicle Kounotori
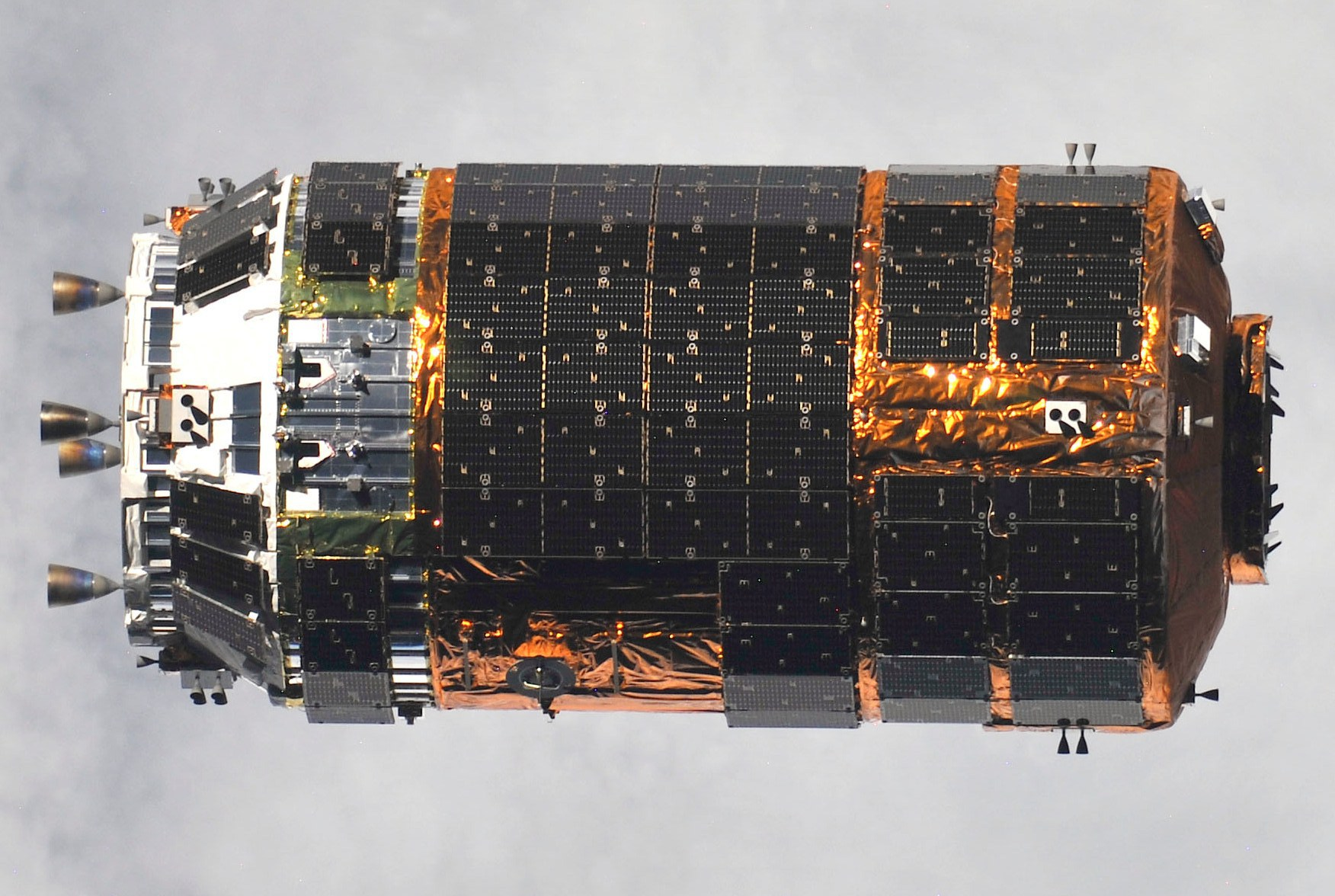
- H-II Transfer Vehicle (HTV-1) approaching the ISS
- Country of origin: Japan
- Operator: JAXA
- Applications: ISS resupply

Specifications
- Spacecraft type: Uncrewed cargo vehicle
- Launch mass: 16,500 kg (36,400 lb)
- Dry mass: 10,500 kg (23,100 lb)
- Payload capacity: 6,000–6,200 kg (13,200–13,700 lb)
- Volume: Pressurised: 14 m^{3} (490 cu ft); Unpressurised: 35 m^{3} (1,200 cu ft)

Dimensions
- Length: ~9.8 m (32 ft) (including thrusters)
- Diameter: 4.4 m (14 ft)

Production
- Status: Retired
- Built: 9
- Launched: 9
- Maiden launch: 10 September 2009 (HTV-1)
- Last launch: 20 May 2020 (Kounotori 9)

Related spacecraft
- Derivatives: HTV-X
- Launch vehicle: H-IIB

The H-II Transfer Vehicle (HTV), also called Kounotori (Japanese: こうのとり; lit. 'white stork'), was an expendable Japanese automated cargo spacecraft designed for International Space Station (ISS) resupply missions, particularly Kibō, the Japanese laboratory module.

Development of the spacecraft began in the early 1990s and the HTV's first mission, HTV-1, was launched on 10 September 2009 on an H-IIB launch vehicle. The HTV was crucial for ISS resupply, especially after the retirement of the Space Shuttle, as it was the only vehicle capable of transporting large International Standard Payload Racks (ISPR) and disposing of old ones within the ISS's US Orbital Segment. The final HTV mission, Kounotori 9, was launched on 20 May 2020. HTV's successor, the HTV-X, made its maiden flight in October 2025.

== Name ==
The name Kounotori was chosen because:

"a white stork carries an image of conveying an important thing (a baby, happiness, and other joyful things), therefore, it precisely expresses the HTV's mission to transport essential materials to the ISS".

== Design ==
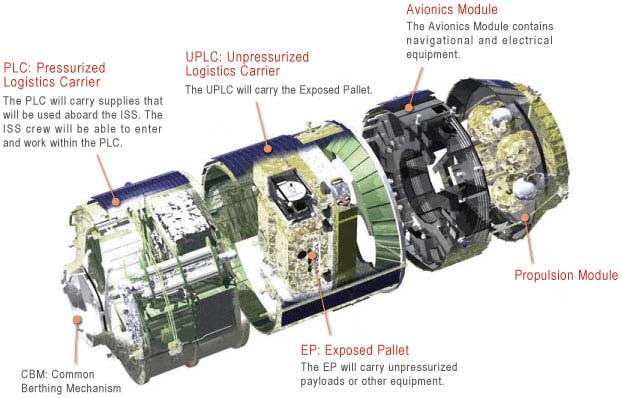
Structure of HTV

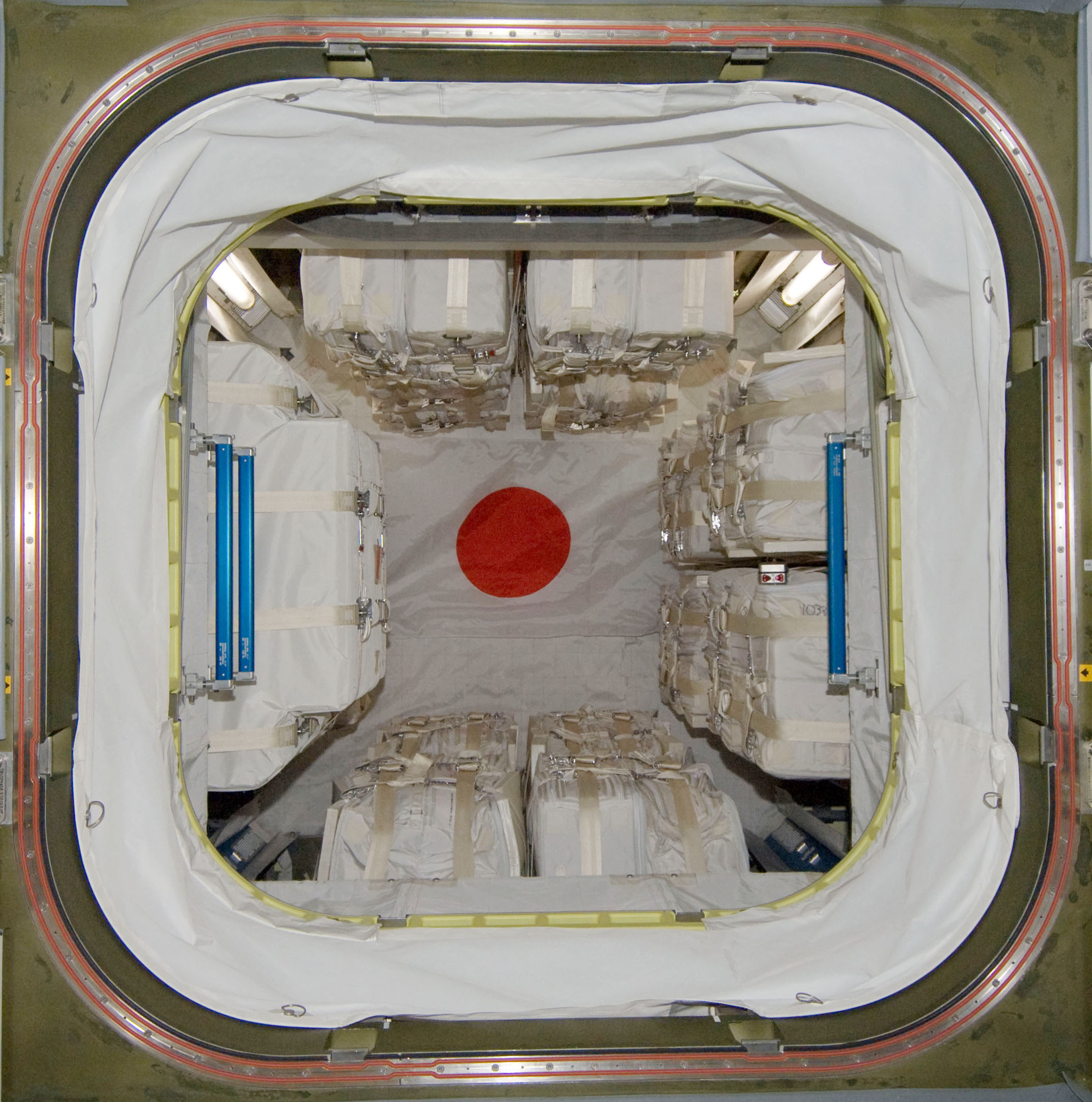
Inside view of the Pressurised Logistics Carrier section of HTV-1

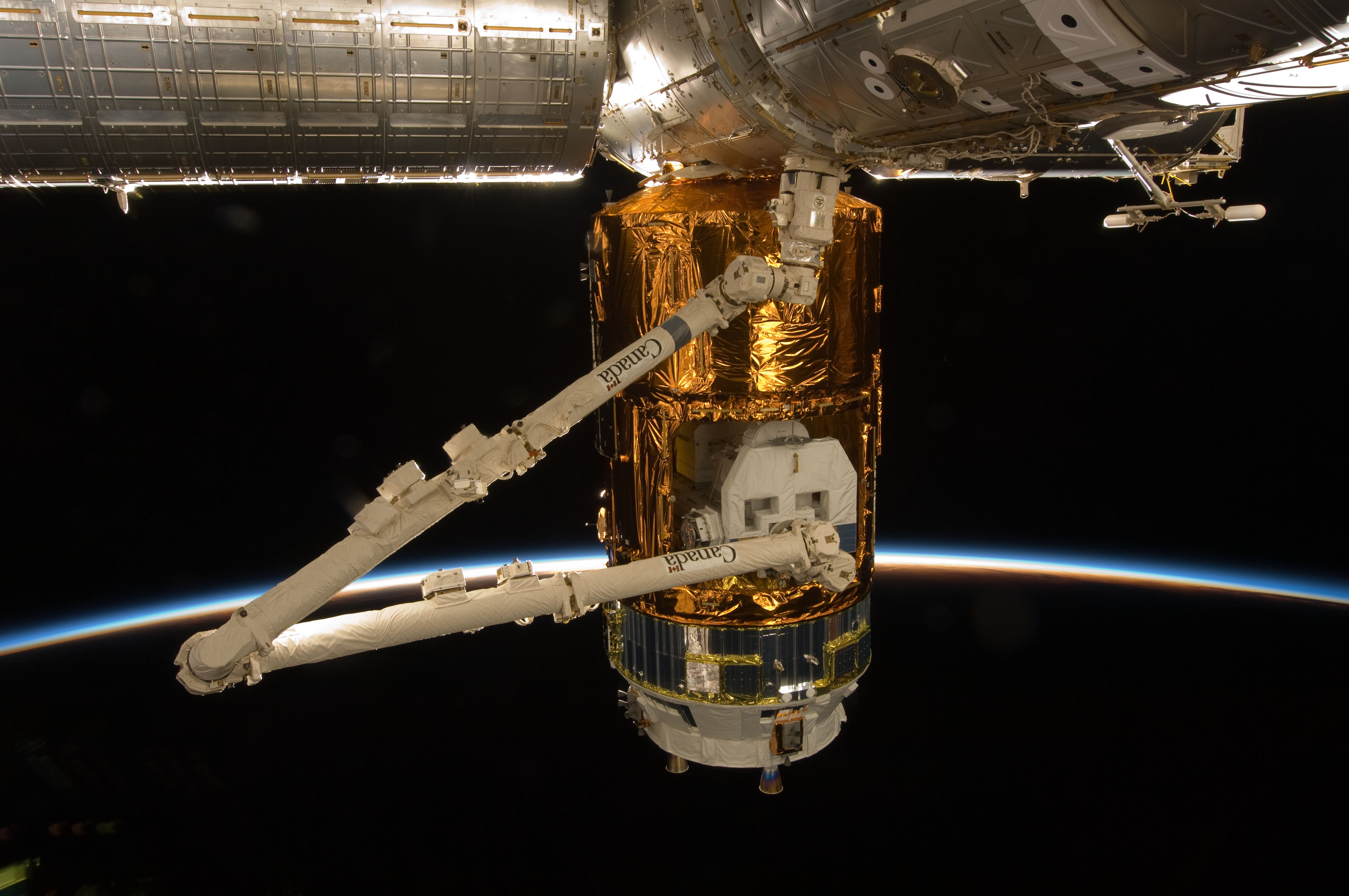
Canadarm2 removing unpressurised payload from HTV-2

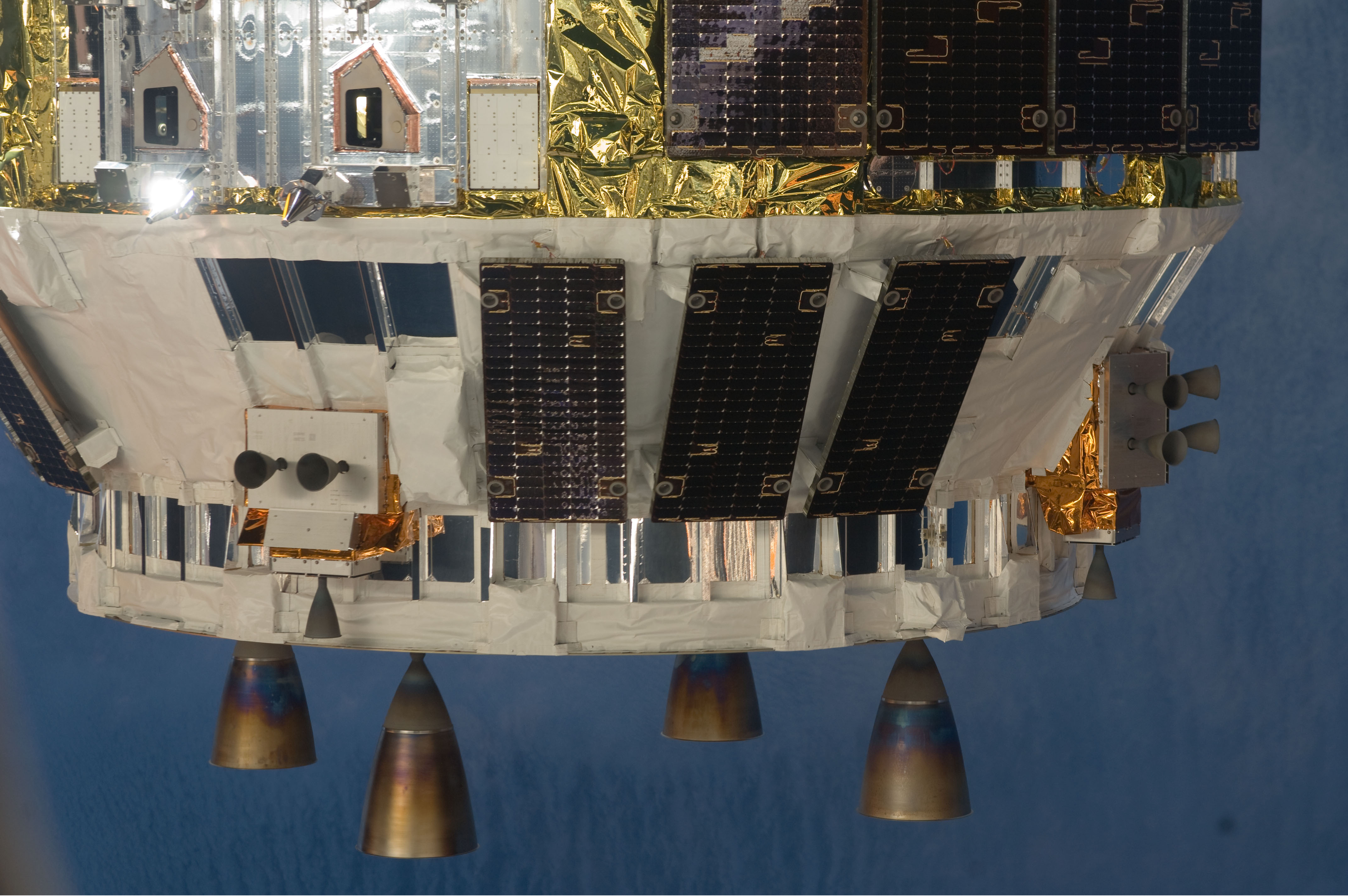
The four main thrusters. Smaller attitude control thrusters can be seen at the right side of this view of HTV-1.

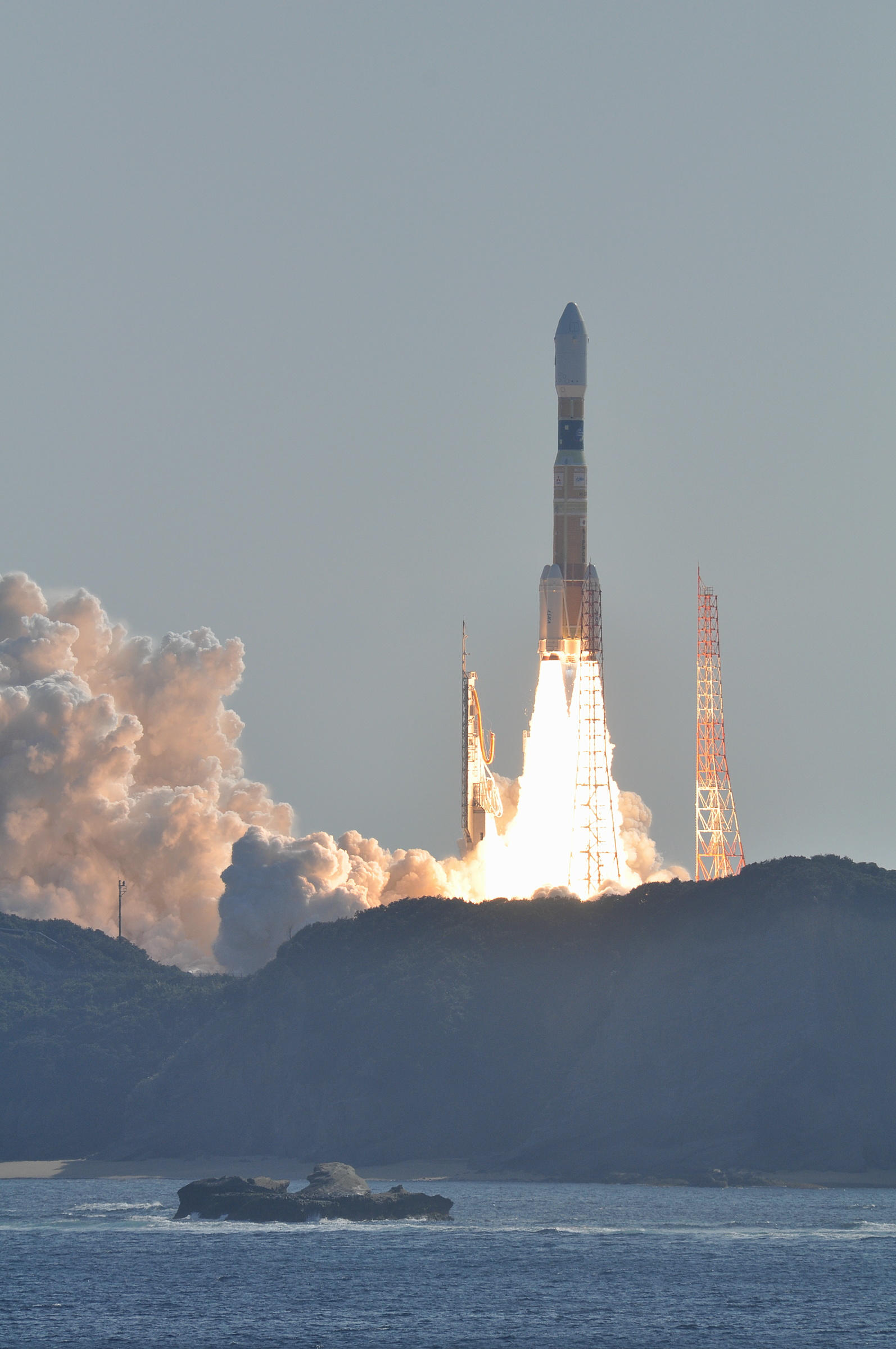
HTV-2 departing Tanegashima spaceport bound for the International Space Station

The HTV was about 9.8 metres (32 ft) long (including maneuvering thrusters at one end) and 4.4 metres (14 ft) in diameter. Total mass when empty was 10,500 kilograms (23,100 lb), with a maximum total payload of 6,000 kilograms (13,000 lb), for a maximum launch weight of 16,500 kilograms (36,400 lb). It consists of Pressurised Logistics Carrier (PLC), Unpressurised Logistics Carrier (ULC), and Main Body which contains avionics and propulsion system. The intent behind the HTV's modularized design was to use different module configurations to match different mission requirements. However, to reduce the development cost it was decided to fly the mixed PLC/ULC configuration only.

To control the HTV's attitude and perform the orbital maneuvers such as rendezvous and reentry, the craft had four 500-N-class main thrusters and twenty-eight 110-N-class attitude control thrusters. Both used bipropellant, namely monomethylhydrazine (MMH) as fuel and mixed oxides of nitrogen (MON3) as oxidizer. HTV-1, HTV-2, and HTV-4 used Aerojet's 110 N R-1E, Space Shuttle's vernier engine, and the 500 N based on the Apollo spacecraft's R-4D. Later HTVs used 500 N class HBT-5 thrusters and 120 N class HBT-1 thrusters made by Japanese manufacturer IHI Aerospace Co., Ltd. The HTV's four spherical propellant tanks usually carried about 2 tonnes of propellant (the maximum capacity was 2432 kg).

== Mission profile ==
The HTV was comparable in function to the Russian Progress, the ESA ATV, the SpaceX Cargo Dragons, and the Cygnus spacecraft, all of which brought supplies to the ISS. Like the ATV, the HTV carried more than twice the payload of the Progress, but was launched less than half as often. Unlike Progress spacecraft, Cargo Dragon 2's and ATV's which used the docking ports automatically, HTVs and American Dragon 1 approached the ISS in stages, and once they reached their closest parking orbit to the ISS, crew grappled them using the robotic arm Canadarm2 and berthed them to an open berthing port on the Harmony module.

The HTV had an external payload bay which was accessed by the robotic arm after it had been berthed to the ISS. New payloads could be moved directly from the HTV to Kibō's exposed facility. Internally, it had eight International Standard Payload Racks (ISPRs) in total which could be unloaded by the crew in a shirt-sleeve environment. After the retirement of NASA's Space Shuttle in 2011, HTVs became the only spacecraft capable of transporting ISPRs to the ISS. The SpaceX Dragon and Northrop Grumman Cygnus could carry resupply cargo bags but not ISPRs.

After the unloading process was completed, the HTV was loaded with waste and unberthed. The vehicle then deorbited and was destroyed during reentry, the debris felling into the Pacific Ocean.

== Flights ==
Initially seven missions were planned between 2008 and 2015. With the extension of the ISS project through 2028, three more missions were added, with the tenth flight planned to debut an improved, cost-reduced version called the HTV-X.

The first vehicle was launched on an H-IIB rocket, a more powerful version of the earlier H-IIA, at 17:01 UTC on 10 September 2009, from Launch Pad 2 of the Yoshinobu Launch Complex at the Tanegashima Space Center.

By May 2020, all nine missions planned for HTV had been successfully launched, and the spacecraft was retired. The improved HTV-X is planned to be first used for the tenth flight and will perform scheduled ISS resupply duties starting in 2025.

HTV	Launch date/time (UTC)	Berth date/time (UTC)	Rocket, flight	Reentry date/time (UTC)	Outcome
HTV-1	10 September 2009, 17:01:56	17 September 2009, 22:12	H-IIB, TF1	1 November 2009, 21:26	Success
HTV-2	22 January 2011, 05:37:57	27 January 2011, 14:51	H-IIB, F2	30 March 2011, 03:09	Success
HTV-3	21 July 2012, 02:06:18	27 July 2012, 14:34	H-IIB, F3	14 September 2012, 05:27	Success
HTV-4	3 August 2013, 19:48:46	9 August 2013, 15:38	H-IIB, F4	7 September 2013, 06:37	Success
HTV-5	19 August 2015, 11:50:49	24 August 2015, 17:28	H-IIB, F5	29 September 2015, 20:33	Success
HTV-6	9 December 2016, 13:26:47	13 December 2016, 18:24	H-IIB, F6	5 February 2017, 15:06	Success
HTV-7	22 September 2018, 17:52:27	27 September 2018, 18:08	H-IIB, F7	10 November 2018, 21:38	Success
HTV-8	24 September 2019, 16:05:05	28 September 2019, 14:09	H-IIB, F8	3 November 2019, 02:09	Success
HTV-9	20 May 2020, 17:31:00	25 May 2020, 12:13	H-IIB, F9 (last)	20 August 2020, 07:07	Success

== Successor: HTV-X ==
In May 2015, Japan's Ministry of Education, Culture, Sports, Science and Technology announced a proposal to replace the HTV with an improved, cost-reduced version preliminary called HTV-X. The HTV-X has a length of 6.2 m, or 10 m with the unpressurised cargo module fitted. The payload fairing adaptor and payload dispenser have been widened from 1.7 m to 4.4 m. An evolved version of HTV-X called HTV-XG is being considered for transferring cargo to the Lunar Gateway as part of the Artemis program. The first flight of HTV-X took place on 26 October 2025.

== Former evolutionary proposals ==
=== HTV-R ===
As of 2010, JAXA was planning to add a return capsule option. In this concept, HTV's pressurized cargo would be replaced by a reentry module capable of returning 1,600 kilograms (3,500 lb) cargo from ISS to Earth. Further, conceptual plans in 2012 included a follow-on spacecraft design by 2022 which would accommodate a crew of three and carry up to 400 kilograms (880 lb) of cargo.

=== Lagrange outpost resupply ===
As of 2014, both JAXA and Mitsubishi conducted studies of a next generation HTV as a possible Japanese contribution to the proposed international crewed outpost at Earth-Moon L2. This variant of HTV was to be launched by H-X Heavy and can carry 1800 kg of supplies to EML2. Modifications from the current HTV included the addition of solar electric paddles and extension of the propellant tank.

=== Human-rated variant ===
A proposal announced in June 2008, "Preliminary Study for Manned Spacecraft with Escape System and H-IIB Rocket" suggested combining HTV's propulsion module with a human-rated capsule for four people.

=== Japanese space station ===
A Japanese space station was proposed to be built up from HTV modules. This method was similar to how the modules in Mir, as well as many modules of the Russian Orbital Segment of the ISS were based on the TKS cargo vehicle design.

== Gallery ==
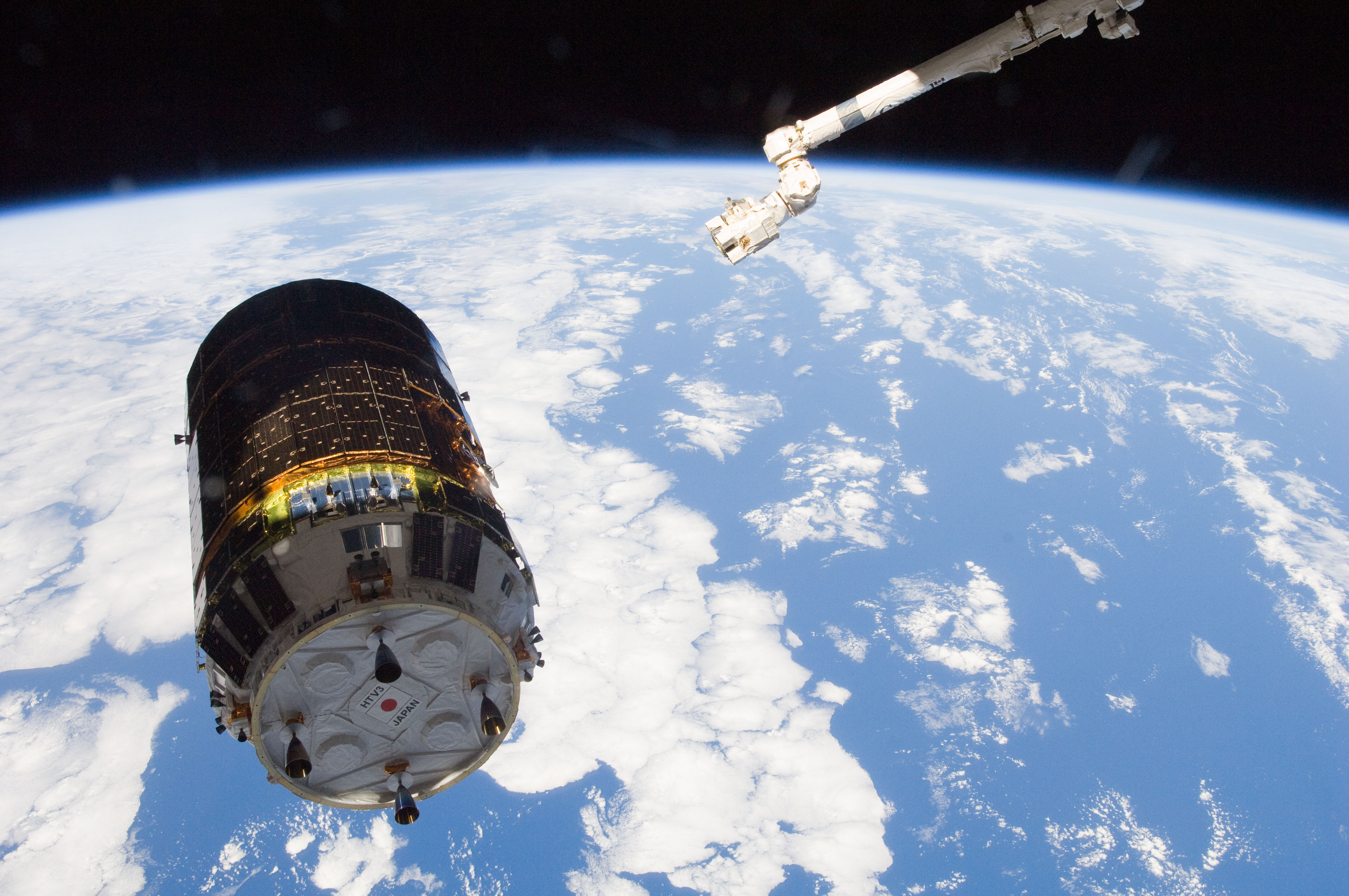
HTV-3 near ISS

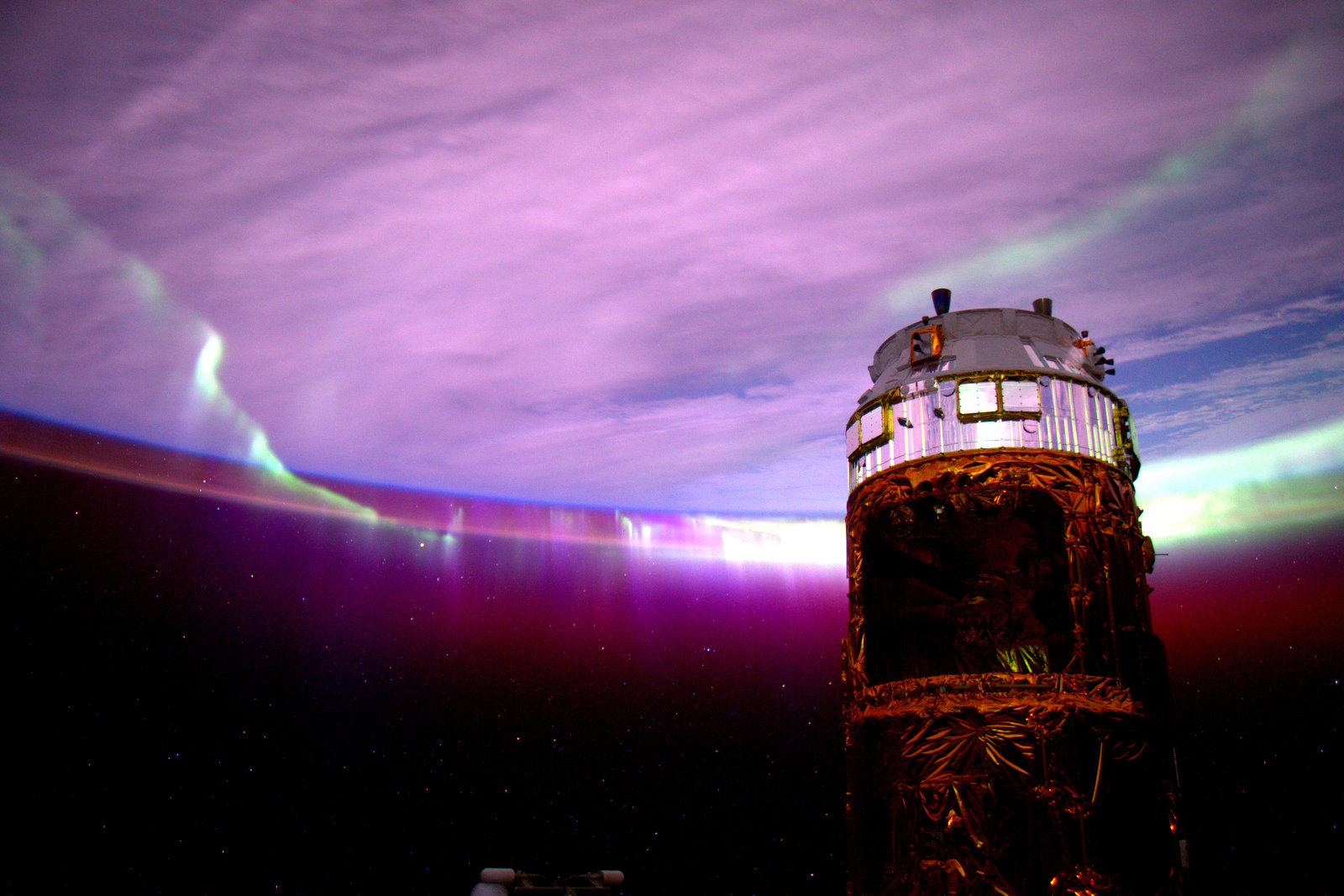
Kounotori 5 (HTV-5) with Aurora australis

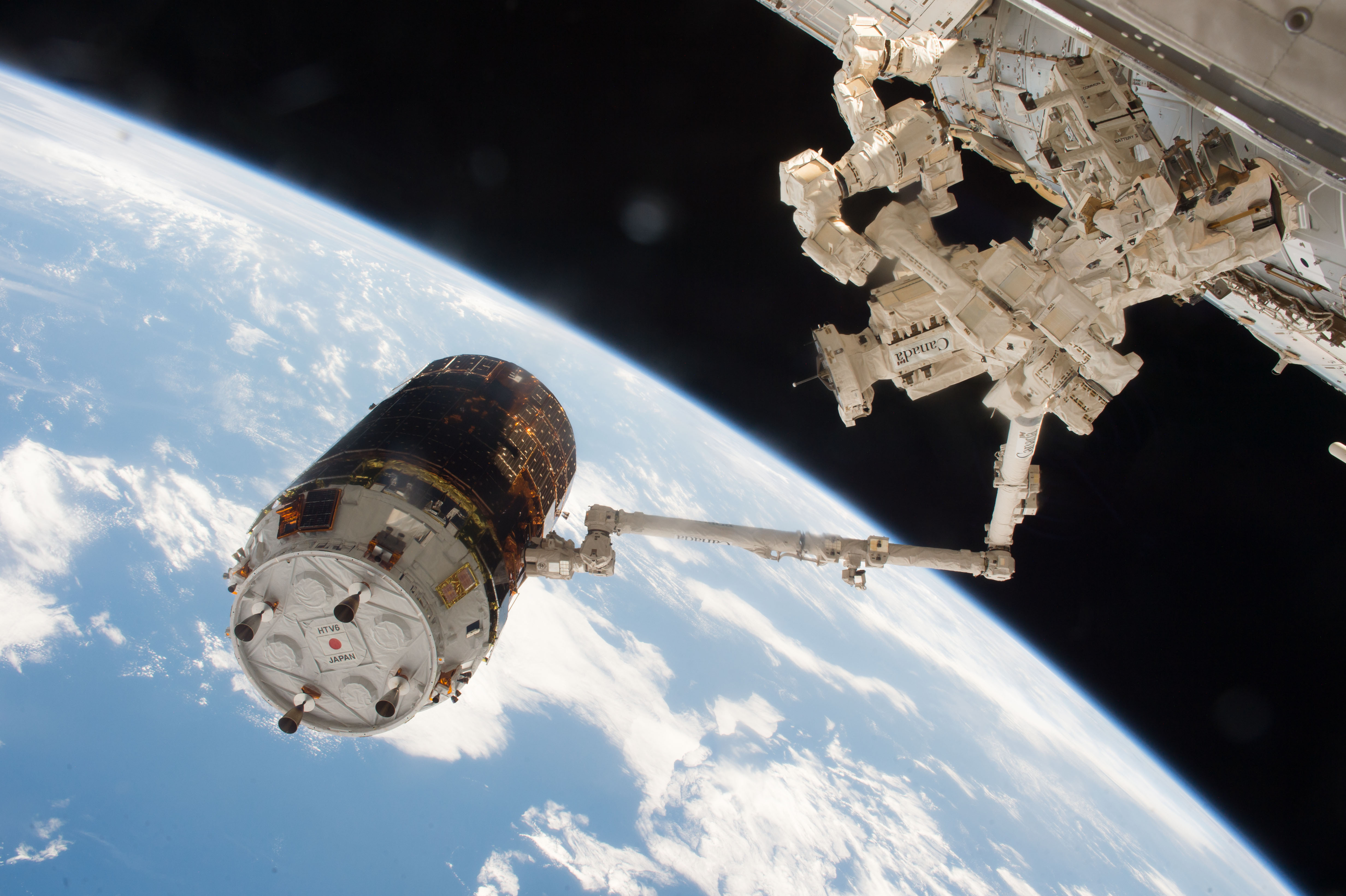
HTV-6 grappled to a robotic arm of ISS

== See also ==
- Cargo spacecraft
- Comparison of space station cargo vehicles
- Cygnus – an American commercial cargo spacecraft that used the communication system developed for HTV
- Fuji – cancelled Japanese crewed spacecraft proposal
- HOPE-X – cancelled cargo spaceplane proposal
