= H-IIB =

Expendable launch system

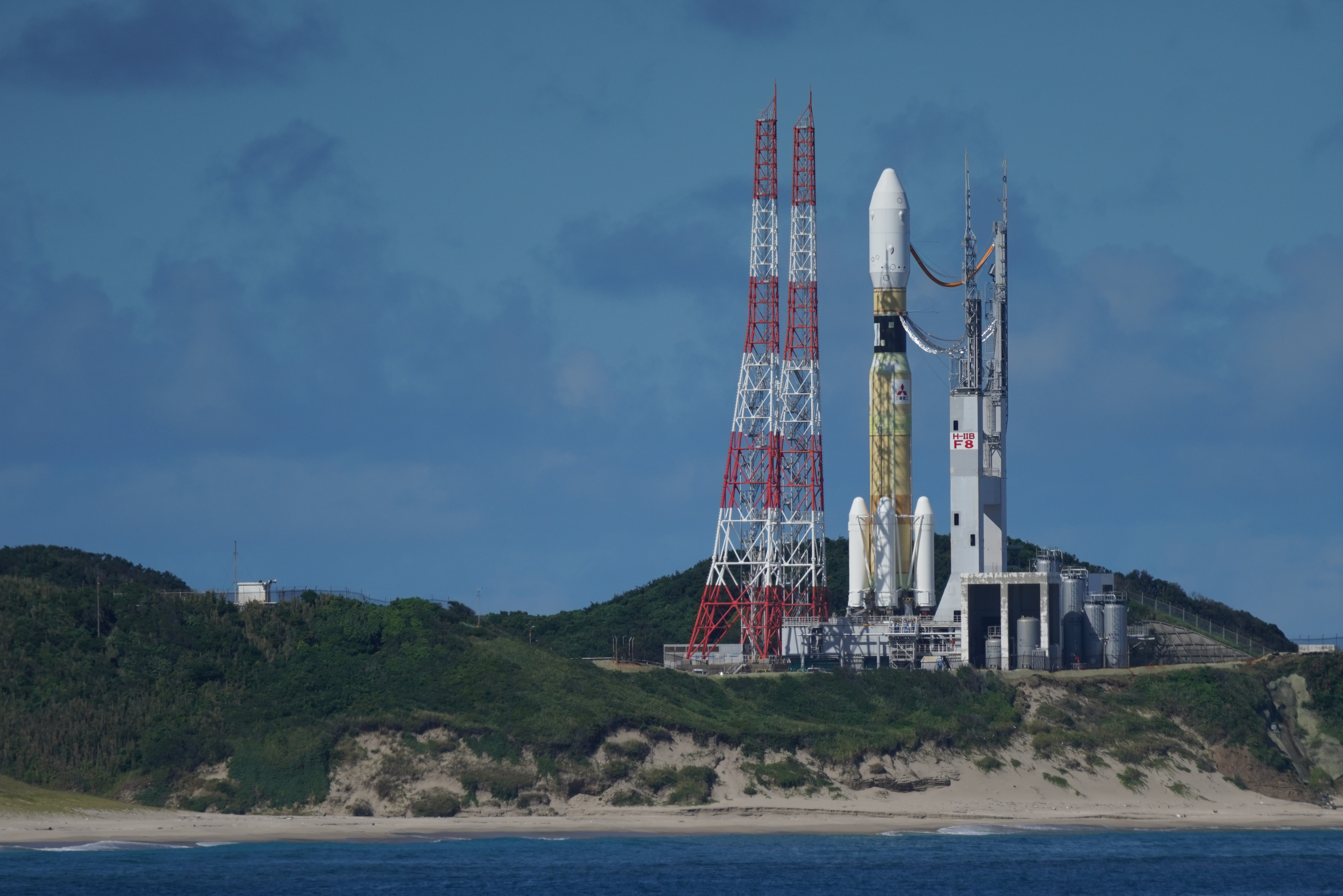
- H-IIB Flight 8 at the launch pad in September 2019
- Function: Medium-lift launch vehicle
- Manufacturer: Mitsubishi Heavy Industries
- Country of origin: Japan
- Cost per launch: US$112.5 million

Size
- Height: 56.6 m (185 ft 8 in)
- Mass: 531,000 kg (1,171,000 lb)
- Stages: 2

Capacity

Payload to LEO
- Mass: 19,000 kg (42,000 lb)

Payload to ISS (carrying the HTV)
- Mass: 16,500 kg (36,400 lb)

Payload to GTO
- Mass: 8,000 kg (18,000 lb)

Associated rockets
- Family: H-II family
- Based on: H-IIA
- Derivative work: H3
- Comparable: Ariane 5; Atlas V; Falcon 9; Proton-M

Launch history
- Status: Retired
- Launch sites: Tanegashima, LA-Y2
- Total launches: 9
- Success(es): 9
- First flight: 10 September 2009
- Last flight: 20 May 2020
- Carries passengers or cargo: H-II Transfer Vehicle

Boosters – SRB-A3
- No. boosters: 4
- Height: 15.1 m (49 ft 6 in)
- Diameter: 2.5 m (8 ft 2 in)
- Gross mass: 76,500 kg (168,700 lb) each
- Propellant mass: 66,000 kg (146,000 lb) each
- Maximum thrust: 2,305 kN (518,000 lb_{f}) each
- Total thrust: 9,220 kN (2,070,000 lb_{f})
- Specific impulse: 283.6 s (2.781 km/s)
- Burn time: 116 seconds
- Propellant: HTPB

First stage
- Height: 38 m (124 ft 8 in)
- Diameter: 5.2 m (17 ft 1 in)
- Gross mass: 202,000 kg (445,000 lb)
- Propellant mass: 177,800 kg (392,000 lb)
- Powered by: 2 × LE-7A
- Maximum thrust: 2,196 kN (494,000 lb_{f})
- Specific impulse: 440 seconds (4.3 km/s)
- Burn time: 352 seconds
- Propellant: LH_{2} / LOX

Second stage
- Height: 11 m (36 ft 1 in)
- Diameter: 4 m (13 ft 1 in)
- Gross mass: 20,000 kg (44,000 lb)
- Propellant mass: 16,600 kg (36,600 lb)
- Powered by: 1 × LE-5B
- Maximum thrust: 137 kN (31,000 lb_{f})
- Specific impulse: 448 s (4.39 km/s)
- Burn time: 499 seconds
- Propellant: LH_{2} / LOX

The H-IIB (H2B) was a Japanese expendable launch system jointly developed by JAXA and Mitsubishi Heavy Industries. It was used exclusively to launch the H-II Transfer Vehicle (HTV, or Kōnotori) cargo spacecraft to the International Space Station.

The H-IIB was a two-stage rocket powered by liquid hydrogen and liquid oxygen (hydrolox) engines, with four strap-on solid rocket boosters, and was launched from the Tanegashima Space Center in southern Japan. It could deliver up to 8,000 kg (18,000 lb) to geostationary transfer orbit (GTO), compared with 4,000–6,000 kg (8,800–13,200 lb) for its predecessor, the H-IIA. Its performance to low Earth orbit (LEO) was sufficient to carry the 16,500 kg (36,400 lb) HTV.

The H-IIB made its debut in September 2009 and flew nine times through May 2020, all successfully.

== Development ==
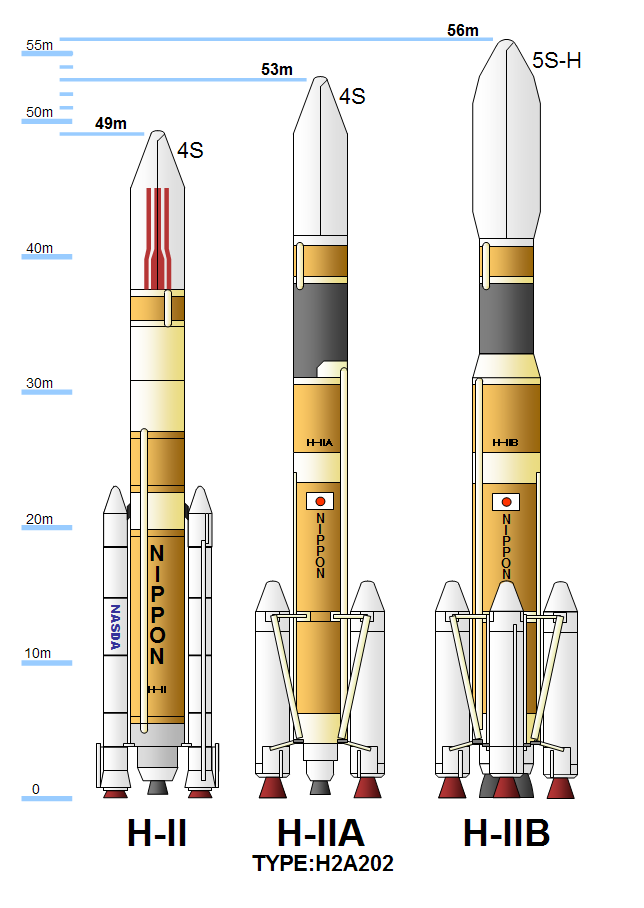
Comparison of H-II series of rockets. From left: H‑II, H‑IIA, and H‑IIB

The H-IIB was a space launch vehicle jointly designed, manufactured and operated by JAXA and Mitsubishi Heavy Industries to launch the H-II Transfer Vehicle. The system was designed to adopt methods and components that have already been verified by flights on the H-IIA, so that manufacturing the new launch vehicle would be more cost-effective, with less risk, in a shorter period of time. JAXA was in charge of preliminary design, readiness of the ground facility, and the development of new technologies for the H-IIB, in which the private sector has limited competencies, while the Mitsubishi Heavy Industries was responsible for manufacturing. JAXA successfully conducted eight firing tests of the new cluster design with the simulated first-stage propulsion system, called Battleship Firing Tests, since March 2008, at MHI's Tashiro Test Facility in Ōdate, Akita Prefecture.

Before launch, two Captive Firing Tests were conducted on the H-IIB. The first test, which consisted of firing the first stage for ten seconds, was originally scheduled to occur at 02:30 UTC on 27 March 2009, however it was cancelled after the launch pad's coolant system failed to activate. This was later discovered to have been due to a manual supply valve not being open. The test was rescheduled for 1 April 2009, but then postponed again due to a leak in a pipe associated with the launch facility's fire suppression system. The test was rescheduled for 2 April 2009, when it was successfully conducted at 05:00 UTC. Following this, the second test, which involved a 150-second burn of the first stage, was scheduled for 20 April. This was successfully conducted at 04:00 UTC on 22 April 2009, following a two-day delay due to unfavorable weather conditions. A ground test, using a battleship mockup of the rocket was subsequently conducted on 11 July 2009.

By 2009, the development program of the H-IIB had cost approximately 27 billion yen.

== Vehicle description ==
The H-IIB launch vehicle was a two-stage rocket. The first stage used liquid oxygen and liquid hydrogen as propellants and had four strap-on solid rocket boosters (SRB-A3) powered by polybutadiene. The first stage was powered by two LE-7A engines, instead of one for the H-IIA. In addition, the first-stage body of the H-IIB was 5.2 m in diameter compared with 4 m for the H-IIA. The total length of the first stage was extended by 1 m from that of H-IIA. As a result, the H-IIB first stage held 70% more propellant than that of the H-IIA. The second stage was powered by a single LE-5B engine, which was also propelled by a hydrogen/oxygen fuel and oxidizer.

== Launch history ==
The first launch of the H-IIB occurred on 10 September 2009 at 17:01:46 UTC. It successfully launched the HTV-1, which was on a mission to resupply the International Space Station (ISS).

Flight	Date of Launch (UTC)	Payload	Remarks	Result
TF1	10 September 2009; 17:01:46	HTV-1	H-IIB flight test HTV demonstration flight	Success
F2	22 January 2011; 05:37:57	Kounotori 2		Success
F3	21 July 2012; 02:06:18	Kounotori 3		Success
F4	3 August 2013; 19:48:46	Kounotori 4		Success
F5	19 August 2015; 11:50:49	Kounotori 5		Success
F6	9 December 2016; 13:26:47	Kounotori 6		Success
F7	22 September 2018; 17:52:27	Kounotori 7		Success
F8	24 September 2019; 16:05:05	Kounotori 8		Success
F9	20 May 2020; 17:31:00	Kounotori 9	Final flight of H-IIB; Final flight of HTV	Success

== See also ==
- Comparison of orbital launchers families
- Comparison of orbital launch systems
