= Kounotori 2 =

2011 Japanese resupply spaceflight to the ISS

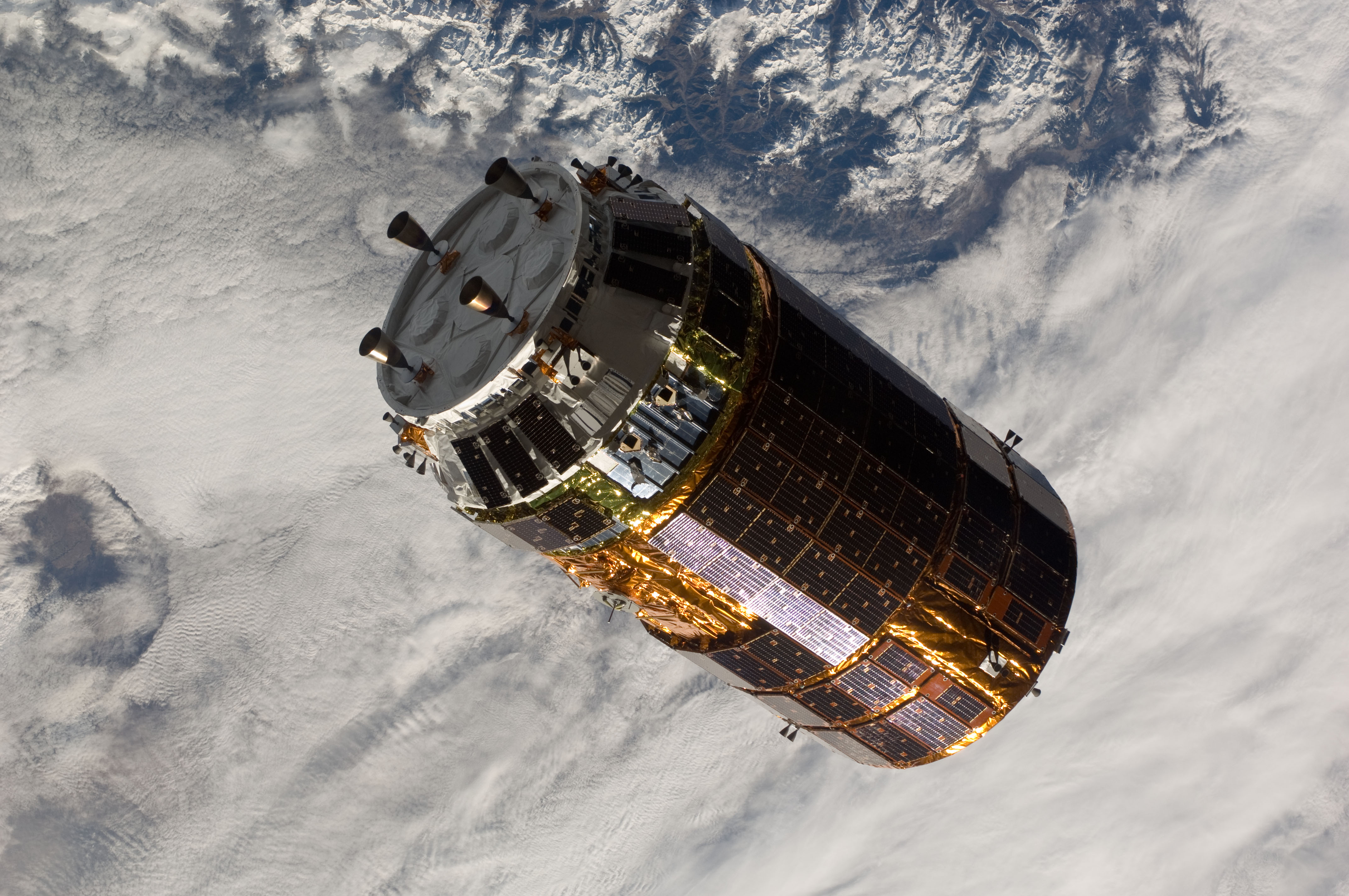
- Kounotori 2 approaches the ISS on 27 January 2011.
- Mission type: ISS resupply
- Operator: JAXA
- COSPAR ID: 2011-003A
- SATCAT no.: 37351
- Mission duration: 67 days

Spacecraft properties
- Spacecraft: Kounotori-2
- Spacecraft type: H-II Transfer Vehicle
- Manufacturer: Mitsubishi Heavy Industries
- Launch mass: 16000 kg
- Dry mass: 10700 kg (note: mass without cargo)

Start of mission
- Launch date: 22 January 2011; 05:37:57 UTC
- Rocket: H-IIB No. 2
- Launch site: Tanegashima, Yoshinobu 2
- Contractor: Mitsubishi Heavy Industries

End of mission
- Disposal: Deorbited
- Decay date: 30 March 2011, 03:09 UTC

Orbital parameters
- Reference system: Geocentric orbit
- Regime: Low Earth orbit
- Inclination: 51.66°

Berthing at ISS
- Berthing port: Harmony
- RMS capture: 27 January 2011
- Berthing date: 27 January 2011, 14:51 UTC
- Unberthing date: 28 March 2011, 13:43 UTC
- RMS release: 28 March 2011, 15:46 UTC
- Time berthed: 60 days

Cargo
- Mass: 5300 kg
- Pressurised: 4000 kg
- Unpressurised: 1300 kg
- Water: 280 kg (as part 4000 kg PLC cargo mass
- HTV ISS Resupply

Kounotori 2 (こうのとり2号機, "white stork"), also known as HTV-2, was launched on 22 January 2011 and was the second flight of the Japanese H-II Transfer Vehicle to resupply the International Space Station (ISS). It was launched by the H-IIB Launch Vehicle No. 2 (H-IIB F2) manufactured by Mitsubishi Heavy Industries (MHI) and JAXA. After the supplies were unloaded, Kounotori 2 was loaded with waste material from ISS, including used experiment equipment and used clothes. Kounotori 2 was then unberthed and separated from the ISS and burned up upon reentering the atmosphere on 30 March 2011.

== Specifications ==
Kounotori 2 is 4 metres (13 ft) across and about 10 metres (33 ft) long. It consists primarily of three parts: a Propulsion Module, an Avionics Module, and a Logistics Carrier.

The propulsion module is installed at the rear of the Kounotori and is composed of the main engines for orbit change, the reaction control system (RCS) thrusters for positioning and attitude control, fuel and oxidizing reagent tanks, and high-pressure air tanks. The avionics module is installed in the center part of Kounotori, with electronic equipment for guidance control, power supply, and telecommunications data processing. The logistics carrier stores supplies.

== Cargo items ==
Kounotori 2 carried 5,300 kilograms (11,700 lb) of cargo to ISS, consisting of 4,000 kilograms (8,800 lb) in the Pressurized Logistics Carrier (PLC) and 1,300 kilograms (2,900 lb) in the Unpressurized Logistics Carrier (ULC). Cargo in the PLC consists of spare system components (51% of cargo weight), food (24%), science experiment materials (10%), crew commodities (8%), and water (7%) i.e. 280 kilograms (620 lb) of water. It included the Kobairo (Gradient Heating Furnace) rack and a Multipurpose Small Payload Rack (MSPR).

The Gradient Heating Furnace is a high-temperature electrical furnace that will be used to generate large scale, high-quality crystals from melting materials. The MSPR is a multipurpose rack that will be used for many different functions. The rack consists of three main components – a Work volume, a Work bench, and a Small experiment area. One experiment that is already planned for the Work volume, to be launched on a later flight, is the Aquatic Habitat, which will be used to breed small fish in order to study their responses to microgravity and cosmic radiation.

Once Kounotori 2 was berthed to the ISS, both Kobairo and the MSPR were transferred into the Japanese Pressurized Module. The installation and commissioning of these racks will initiate the 2nd phase of the Japanese Experiment Module (JEM) utilization.

Kounotori 2's Unpressurized Logistics Carrier (ULC) carried an EP (Exposed Pallet) with two U.S. ORUs (Orbital Replacement Units) attached: an FHRC (Flex Hose Rotary Coupler) and CTC-4 (Cargo Transportation Container-4). Both the FHRC and CTC-4 were transferred from Kounotori 2's EP to the space station's ELC-4 using the ISS's manipulator "Dextre".

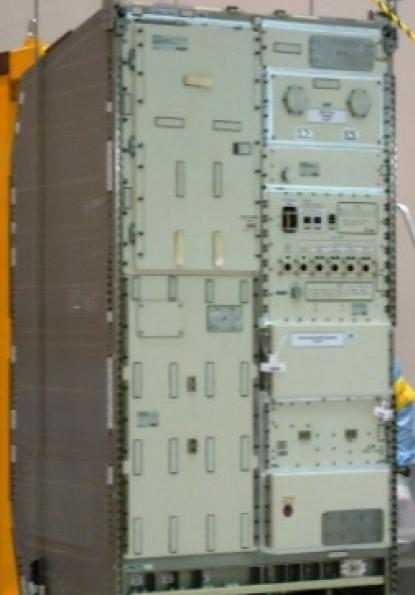
Gradient Heating Furnace

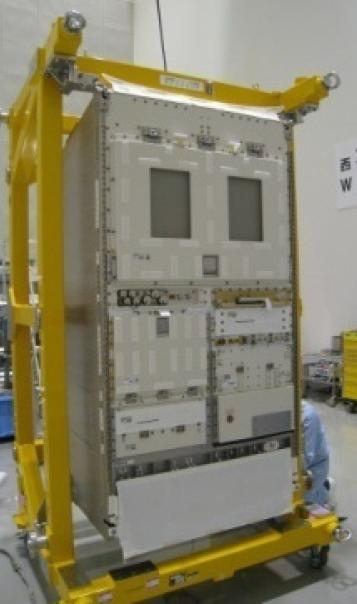
Multi-purpose Small Payload Rack

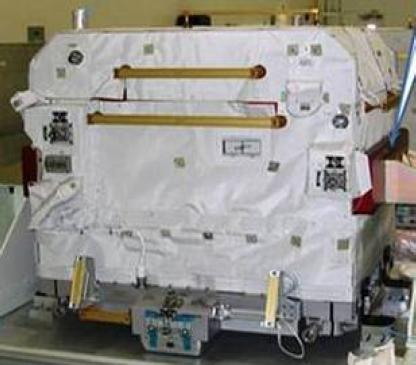
Cargo Transport Container

== Operation ==
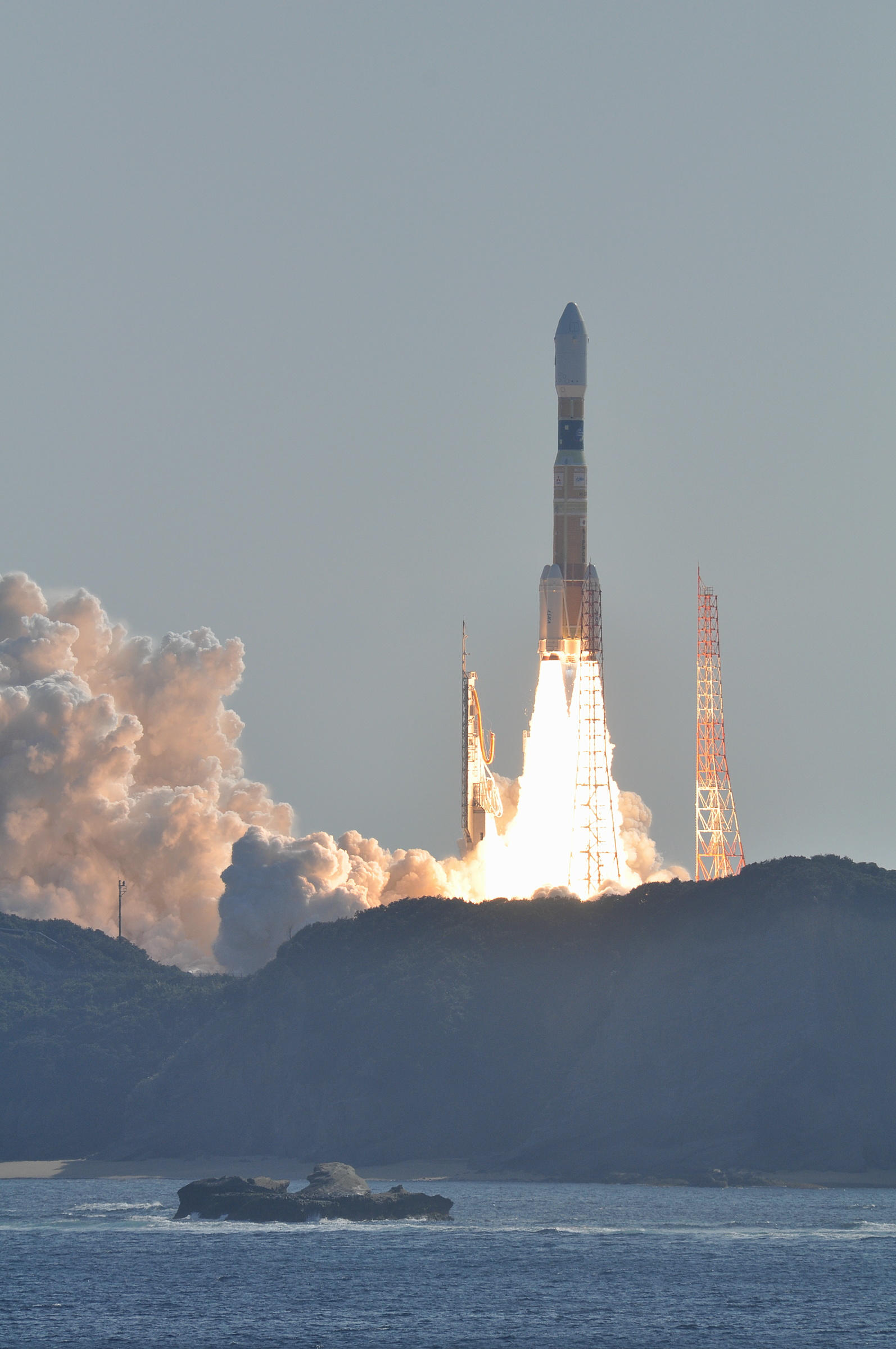
The H-IIB rocket carrying Kounotori 2 lifts off from the Tanegashima space center on 22 January 2011.

Scheduling of Kounotori 2 operation was affected by the Space Shuttle mission STS-133. STS-133 was originally planned to be launched in September 2010, well before Kounotori 2. After several delays, eventually, STS-133 was scheduled for February 2011. Since Kounotori 2 needed to depart the ISS after the Space Shuttle to carry away the wastes from the Shuttle's cargo, Kounotori 2's schedule was changed to stay attached to the ISS for two months, close to its design limit, from the initial plan of 40 days. Also, the Dextre robot hand had to keep holding the external payload and wait for the arrival of STS-133, since STS-133 was carrying the Logistics Carrier 4 stowage platform to install the external payload.

=== Launch and rendezvous with ISS ===
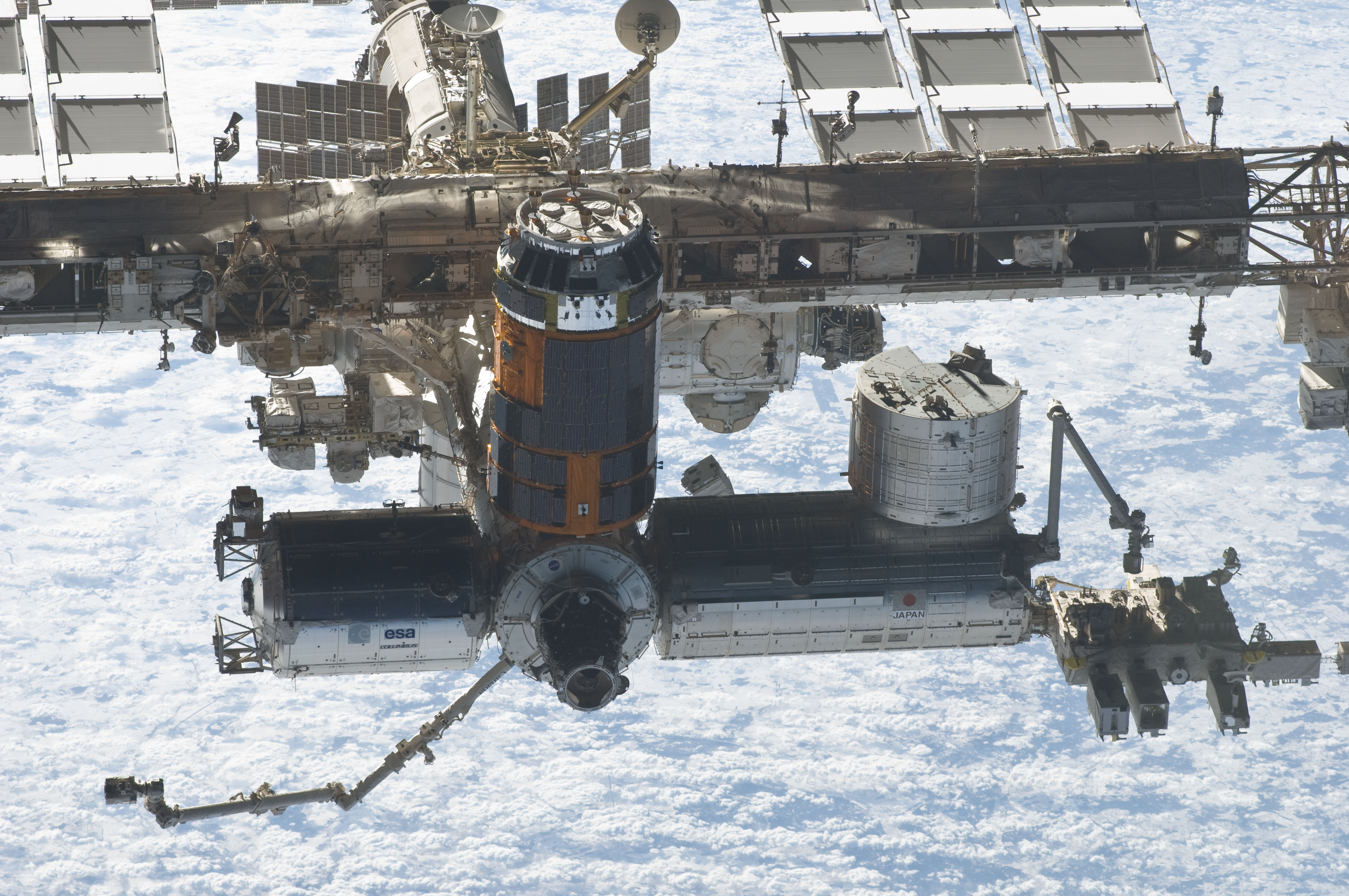
A close-up view of Kounotori 2 photographed by an STS-133 crew member on the departing space shuttle Discovery.

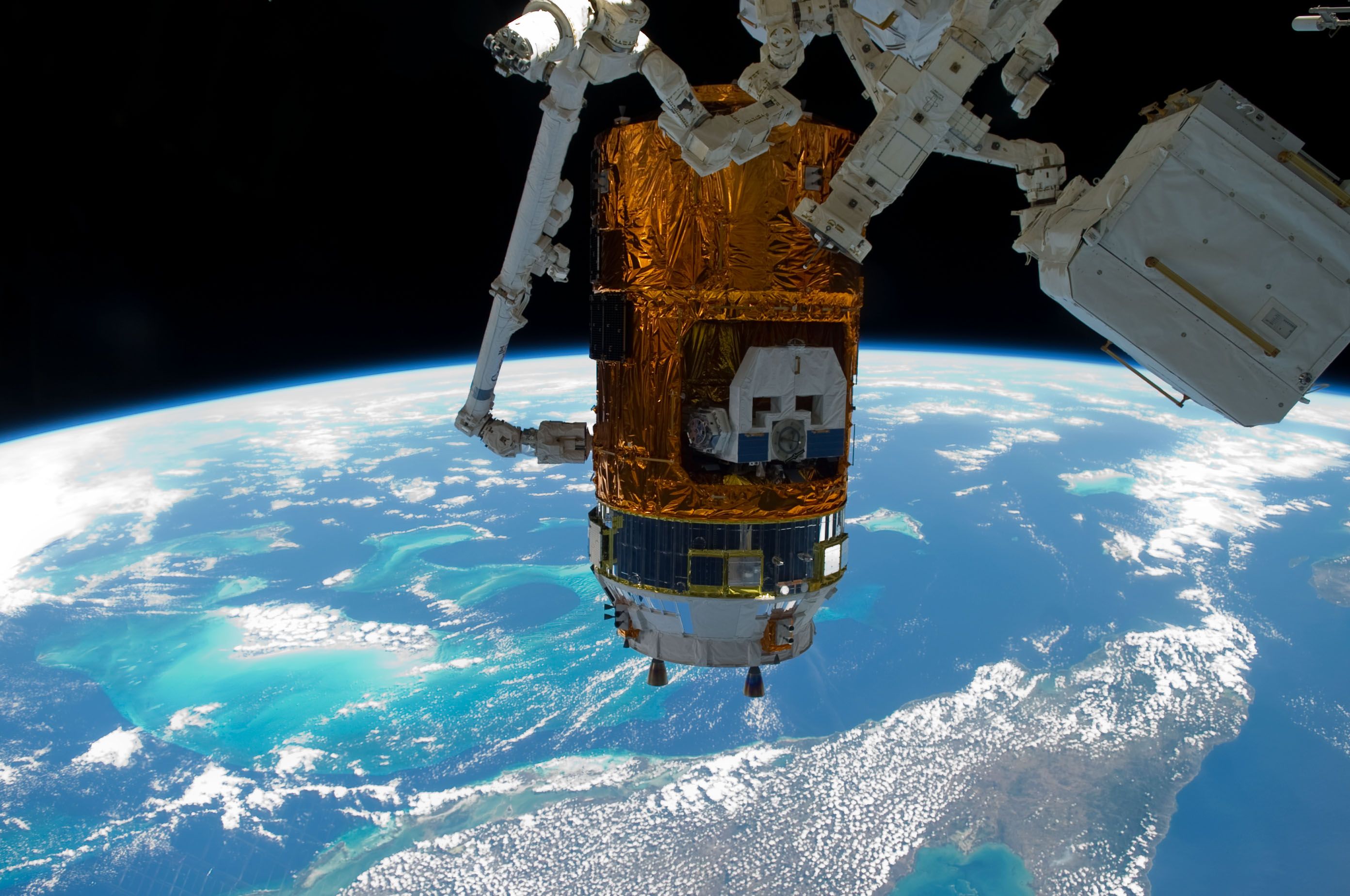
The Canadarm2 moves HTV-2 back to the nadir port of Harmony on 10 March 2011.

Kounotori 2 was initially scheduled to launch on 20 January 2011, but this was postponed for two days due to a bad weather forecast. The H-IIB rocket with Kounotori 2 onboard was successfully launched from Tanegashima Space Center on 22 January 2011, 05:37:57 UTC. It made its rendezvous with the space station for a subsequent docking to the Harmony module's nadir port on 27 January 2011. The space station's Space Station Remote Manipulator System (Canadarm2) grabbed Kounotori 2 at 11:41 UTC as the vehicles flew 350 kilometres (220 mi) over the southern Indian Ocean. Kounotori 2 was berthed to the space station using the Canadarm2. The Canadarm2 was controlled by Expedition 26 flight engineers Catherine Coleman and Paolo Nespoli using the Robotic Work Station (RWS) in the observatory module Cupola which provided them with increased situational awareness by enabling a 360° view of the exterior of the space station. The berthing was completed at 14:51 UTC after bolts engaged inside the berthing port to firmly attach the spacecraft to the International Space Station.

=== Operation while berthed to ISS ===
While Kounotori 2 was berthed to the ISS, the crew entered and removed the supplies from the HTV PLC.

Space shuttle mission STS-133 arrived while Kounotori 2 was berthed to ISS. To avoid interference with the payload bay of the shuttle, Kounotori 2 was relocated from Harmony nadir port to zenith port. This was done on 18 February 2011, before the launch of STS-133.

After space shuttle Discovery departed the International Space Station and the STS-133 mission was completed, on 10 March 2011, the ISS crew robotically relocated Kounotori 2 back to the nadir port of the Harmony module. The moving operation began at 11:49 UTC. The spacecraft was attached to the Common Berthing Mechanism (CBM) at Harmony's Earth-facing nadir port at 16:19 UTC. The CBM bolts were fastened at 17:20. The five-hour-long moving operation was completed when the space station crew completed the connections of the electrical cables/lines between the Kounotori's Pressurized Logistics Module (PLC) and the Harmony module at 18:55 UTC.

During the stay of Kounotori 2 at the ISS, the M-9.0 earthquake occurred on 11 March 2011. The ground control center in Tsukuba was damaged, and the monitoring operation had to be handed over temporarily to NASA. Mission control room resumed the operation on 22 March 2011.

=== Crew aboard the ISS ===
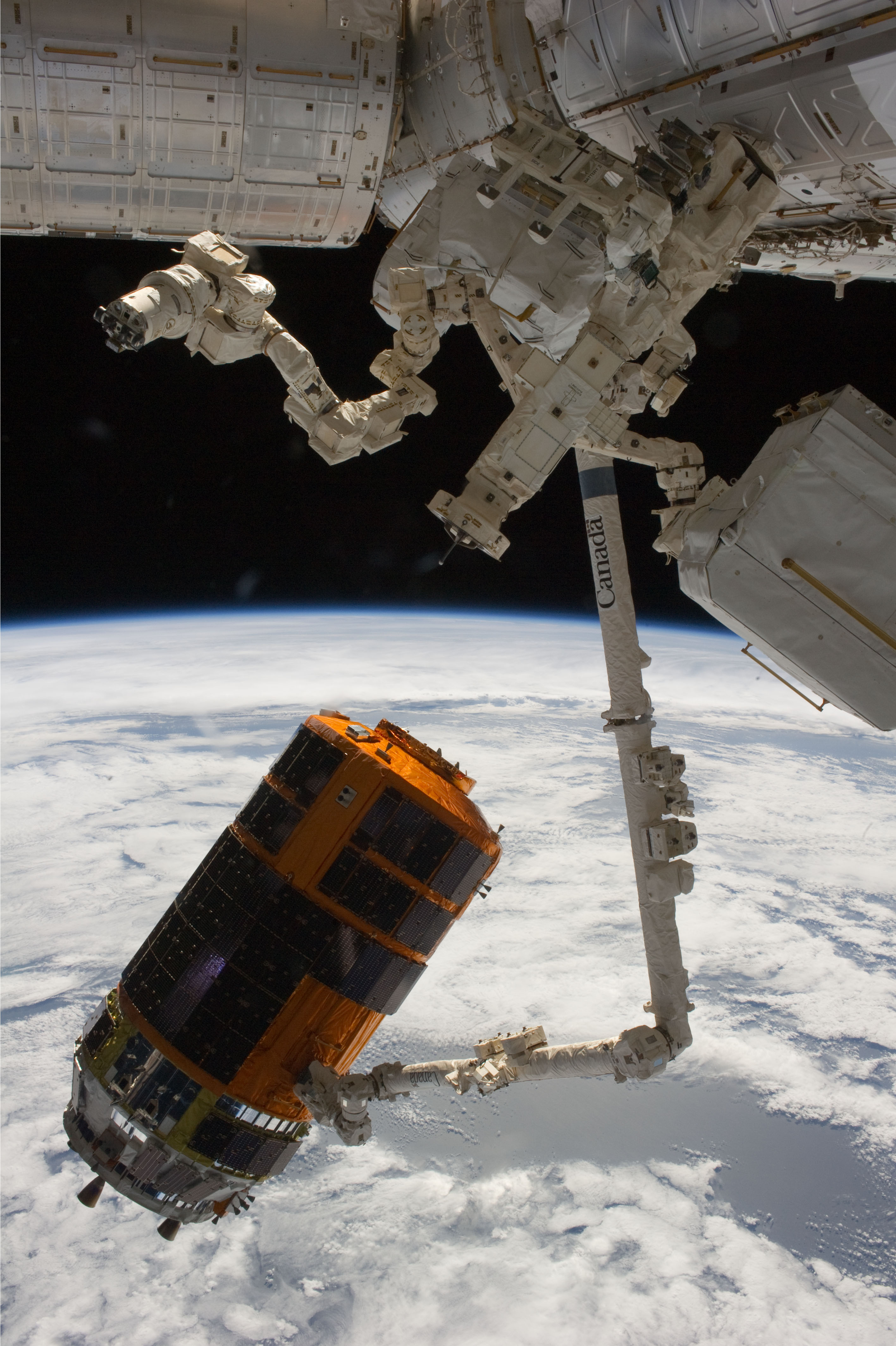
Kounotori 2 was detached and released on 28 March 2011.

The ISS crew upon the arrival of Kounotori 2 were the members of Expedition 26:

- Scott J. Kelly, NASA, Commander
- Aleksandr Kaleri, Roscosmos
- Oleg Skripochka, Roscosmos
- Dmitri Kondratyev, Roscosmos
- Catherine Coleman, NASA
- Paolo Nespoli, European Space Agency (ESA)

=== Departure and reentry ===
After an extended two-month stay, on 28 March 2011, Kounotori 2 was detached from the docking port by robotic hand at 15:29 UTC and released at 15:46 UTC. It reentered the Earth's atmosphere at around 03:09 UTC on 30 March. The reentry was logged by a Reentry Breakup Recorder, one of two carried to the station; the other was installed in the Johannes Kepler ATV and was intended to record its return, but failed to make contact following reentry; consequently, no data was retrieved.

== See also ==
- H-II Transfer Vehicle
- HTV-1
- Automated Transfer Vehicle
- Progress (spacecraft)
- Uncrewed spaceflights to the International Space Station
