= Kounotori 6 =

2016 Japanese resupply spaceflight to the ISS

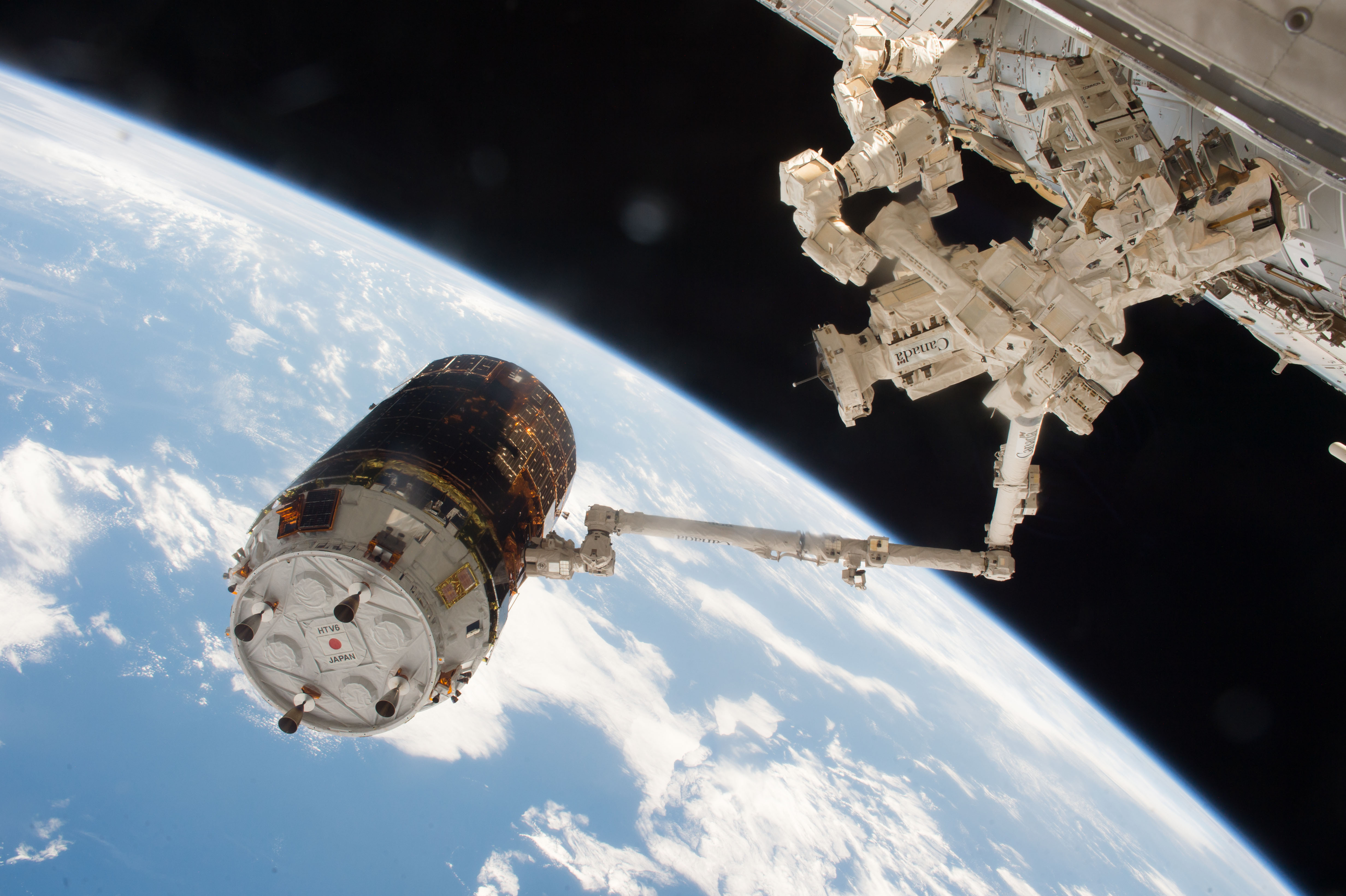
- The SSRMS (Canadarm2) grapples Kounotori 6 spacecraft, prior to berthing on 13 December 2016.
- Mission type: ISS resupply
- Operator: JAXA
- COSPAR ID: 2016-076A
- SATCAT no.: 41881
- Mission duration: 58 days

Spacecraft properties
- Spacecraft: Kounotori 6
- Spacecraft type: HTV
- Manufacturer: Mitsubishi Heavy Industries
- Launch mass: 16400 kg
- Dry mass: 10500 kg
- Payload mass: 5900 kg
- Dimensions: 9.8 metre of long, 4.4 metre of diameter

Start of mission
- Launch date: 9 December 2016, 13:26:47 UTC
- Rocket: H-IIB No. 6
- Launch site: Tanegashima, Yoshinobu 2
- Contractor: Mitsubishi Heavy Industries

End of mission
- Disposal: deorbited
- Decay date: 5 February 2017, 15:06 UTC

Orbital parameters
- Reference system: Geocentric orbit
- Regime: Low Earth orbit
- Inclination: 51.66°

Berthing at ISS
- Berthing port: Harmony
- RMS capture: 13 December 2016, 10:37 UTC
- Berthing date: 13 December 2016, 13:57 UTC
- Unberthing date: 27 January 2017, 10:59 UTC
- RMS release: 27 January 2017, 15:45 UTC

Cargo
- Mass: 5900 kg
- Pressurised: 4000 kg
- Unpressurised: 1900 kg

Kounotori 6 (こうのとり6号機), also known as HTV-6, was the sixth flight of the H-II Transfer Vehicle, an uncrewed cargo spacecraft launched to resupply the International Space Station. It was launched at 13:26:47 UTC on 9 December 2016 aboard H-IIB launch vehicle from Tanegashima Space Center.

== Spacecraft ==
Major changes from previous Kounotori include:

- Built-in payloads to demonstrate new technologies: SFINKS and KITE, described below.
- Reduction of primary batteries to 6 from the previous 7.
- Reduction of solar cell panels to 48 from previous 49.
- Omission of some of navigation/position lights which were Earth-side when approaching to ISS.
- Strengthened EP (Exposed Pallet) maximum payload to 1900 kg from the previous 1600 kg to carry Lithium-ion batteries.

SFINKS (Solar Cell Film Array Sheet for Next Generation on Kounotori Six) will test thin film solar cells in space.

=== Kounotori Integrated Tether Experiment ===
KITE (Kounotori Integrated Tether Experiment) was an experimental electrodynamic tether (EDT). The tether was equipped with a 20 kg end-mass, and would have been 700 m long when deployed, Unfortunately deployment failed, but useful data was still gathered from some of the instruments. A maximum current of 10 mA was planned to run through the tether. Kounotori's ISS rendezvous sensor would have been utilized to measure how the end-mass moves during the test. The EDT experiment was scheduled following Kounotori 6's departure from the ISS, with a planned duration of one week. After the experiment, the tether would have been separated before the spacecraft proceeds with the de-orbit maneuvers. The main objective of this experiment were the orbital demonstration of both extending an uncoated bare-tether, and driving electric currents through the EDT. These two technologies will contribute to gaining capabilities to remove space debris.

== Cargo ==
Kounotori 6 carries about 5900 kg of cargo (including the support structure weight), consisting of 3900 kg in PLC (Pressurized Logistics Carrier) and 1900 kg in ULC (Unpressurized Logistics Carrier).

Cargo in the pressurized compartment includes 30 bags filled with potable water (600 liters), food, crew commodities, CDRA Bed (Carbon Dioxide Removal Assembly), TPF (Two-Phase Flow) experiment unit, PS-TEPC (Position-Sensitive Tissue Equivalent Proportional Chamber) radiation measurement instrument, ExHAM (Exposed Experiment Handrail Attachment Mechanism), HDTV-EF2 high-definition and 4K camera, new J-SSOD (JEM Small Satellite Orbital Deployer), and CubeSats (AOBA-Velox III, TuPOD which comprises two TubeSats (Tancredo-1 and OSNSAT), EGG, ITF-2, STARS-C, FREEDOM, WASEDA-SAT3). Cargo by NanoRacks includes TechEdSat-5, CubeRider, RTcMISS, NREP-P DM7, four Lemur-2. Additionally, the Blue SPHERES satellite of the MIT Space Systems Laboratory is being returned to the ISS for continued autonomous systems research.

Cargo in the unpressurized compartment consists of six lithium-ion batteries and their associated adapter plates to replace existing nickel-hydrogen batteries of the International Space Station. Since each of the new lithium-ion battery has a capability equivalent to two of the current nickel-hydrogen batteries, the six new batteries will replace twelve old batteries, out of the 48 existing batteries of the ISS.

On departure from the ISS, Kounotori 6 carries 9 out of the 12 replaced old batteries which will be disposed of by destructive reentry into Earth's atmosphere. The 3 remaining old batteries stay on the ISS.

== Operation ==
=== Launch ===
On 26 July 2016, the launch was scheduled for 30 September 2016, but on 10 August 2016, postponement was announced due to the leak from piping.

The H-IIB launch vehicle carrying Kounotori 6 lifted off at 13:26:47 UTC on 9 December 2016, and 15 minutes 11 seconds later, Kounotori 6 was released into initial 200 × 300 km orbit.

SFINKS experiment payload began the data collection at 14:16, on 9 December 2016, but it stopped unexpectedly after 509 seconds.

After a series of orbital manoeuvres, Kounotori 6 arrived to the proximity of ISS and captured by SSRMS (Canadarm2) at 10:39 (10:37 according to NASA), on 13 December 2016. Kounotori was bolted to the CBM (Common Berthing Mechanism) of the Harmony nadir port by 13:48 UTC.

=== Operation while berthed to ISS ===
Berthing operation completed at 18:24, on 13 December 2016 UTC, and the hatch opened at 19:44 UTC.

Since 07:44, 14 December 2016, Exposed Pallet (EP) was extracted from Unpressurised Logistics Carrier (ULC) of Kounotori 6 by SSRMS and transferred to Payload and ORU Accommodation (POA). After a combination of two Extra-Vehicular Activities and robotic operations, the lithium-ion battery units and adapter plates were installed. The Exposed Pallet carrying old Nickel-hydrogen battery units was returned to Kounotori 6's Unpresurised Logistics Carrier on 23 January 2017.

=== Departure from the ISS and re-entry to the Earth atmosphere ===
SSRMS grappled and detached Kounotori 6 from the CBM of Harmony nadir port at 10:59, 27 January 2017, and Kounotori 6 was released at 15:45, on 27 January 2017.

Following the undocking after moving to a safe distance from ISS, the Kounotori 6 was to demonstrate the "Kounotori Integrated Tether Experiment" (KITE) using electrodynamic tether to demonstrate space debris removal technology. This experiment was planned for seven days before reentry to the Earth's atmosphere. On 31 January 2017, media reported some problems in extending the tether, bringing to doubt the experiment's success.

A series of deorbit manoeuvres were performed at 08:42, 10:12, and 14:42 UTC, on 5 February 2017. Kounotori 6 reentered to Earth atmosphere over southern Pacific Ocean around 15:06 UTC, on 5 February 2017.
