= International Designator =

Alphanumerical designation for spacecraft

The International Designator is an international identifier assigned to artificial objects in space. It consists of the launch year, a three-digit incrementing launch number of that year (Note: Not to be confused with similar looking ordinal date.) and up to a three-letter code representing the sequential identifier of a piece in a launch. In TLE format the first two digits of the year and the dash are dropped. For example, 1990-037A is the Space Shuttle Discovery on mission STS-31, which carried the Hubble Space Telescope (1990-037B) into space. This launch was the 37th known successful launch worldwide in 1990.

== Historical process ==
The designator has been generally known as the COSPAR ID, named for the Committee on Space Research (COSPAR) of the International Council for Science. COSPAR subsumed the first designation system, devised at Harvard University. That system used letters of the Greek alphabet to designate artificial satellites. This was based on the scientific naming convention for natural satellites. For example, Sputnik 1 was designated 1957 Alpha 2. The launch vehicle, which was brighter in orbit, was designated 1957 Alpha 1. Brighter objects in the same launch were given the lower integer number, and Alpha was given since it was the first launch of the year. The Harvard designation system continued to be used for satellites launched up to the end of 1962, when it was replaced with the modern system. The first satellite to receive a new-format designator was Luna E-6 No.2, 1963-001B, although some sources, including the NSSDC website, retroactively apply the new-format designators to older satellites, even those no longer in orbit at the time of its introduction.

== Assignment procedure ==
Designators are assigned to objects by the United States Space Command along with satellite catalog numbers as they are discovered in space. The United Nations Office for Outer Space Affairs (UNOOSA) and the National Space Science Data Center (NSSDC), part of NASA, maintain two catalogs that provide additional information on the launchers and payloads associated with the designators. While UNOOSA uses COSPAR ID, many NSSDC Master Catalog (NMC) entries are created before launches so they are not always bound to a COSPAR ID. Below are examples:

Satellite	Initial entry (NSSDCA_ID)	Post-launch entry (COSPAR_ID)	Note
BepiColombo	BEPICLMBO	2018-080A	The initial entry was deleted in late 2021
LightSail-2	Not available	2019036AC	The dash is not present
Sojourner	MESURPR (rover)	1996-068A (spacecraft)	Mars Pathfinder Rover
Lucy	LUCY	2021-093A	The initial entry is not available after the launch
Space Shuttle	SHUTTLE	Not available	Flew 135 missions from 1981 to 2011. Each mission has a COSPAR ID but no NSSDC entry.
James Webb Space Telescope	JWST	2021-130A	The initial entry is not available after the launch

Spacecraft which do not complete an orbit of the Earth, for example launches which fail to achieve orbit, are not assigned IDs.

=== Assignment instructions ===
Satellites launched from the International Space Station are assigned a COSPAR ID beginning with "1998-067", because the (first module of the) space station was launched in 1998. For example, the satellite GOMX-3, launched on an H-II Transfer Vehicle on August 19, 2015, from Tanegashima Space Center in Japan, is designated COSPAR ID 1998-067HA, because it first arrived on the International Space Station from where it was later launched.

== See also ==
- Satellite Catalog Number
