= NEXTAR =

Japanese spacecraft bus

NEXTAR NX-300L
- Manufacturer: NEC Space Systems
- Country of origin: Japan
- Applications: Earth observation

Specifications
- Spacecraft type: Earth observation
- Dry mass: 250 kg (550 lb)
- Payload capacity: up to 250 kg (550 lb)
- Dimensions: 950 mm × 950 mm × 950 mm (37 in × 37 in × 37 in) (W×D×H)
- Power: Up to 600 W
- Batteries: Li-ion
- Regime: Low Earth orbit
- Design life: 3 to 5 years

Production
- Status: In Production

NEXTAR (from NEC Next Generation Star) is a Low Earth orbit Earth observation satellite bus designed and manufactured by NEC Space Systems of Japan. This three axis stabilized platform has a bus dry mass of 250 kg (550 lb), it can carry payloads up to 250 kg (550 lb) and 600 W. It uses tri-junction GaAs has an expected life between 3 and 5 years.

Its telemetry and control subsystem includes S band and X band channels.

== Platform models ==
As of 2014, there are three different models of the NEXTAR standardized platform. All feature a common core of features like using the SpaceWire communications protocol, the SpaceCube2 on-board computer and autonomous control functions. The different models are:

- NX-300L: Low Earth orbit platform for small observation satellites in the 300 to 500 kg (660 to 1,100 lb) range. It was born out of the ASNARO 1 work and is used mainly for Earth observation applications.
- NX-1500L: Low Earth orbit platform for medium observation satellites in the 1,000 to 1,500 kg (2,200 to 3,300 lb) range. It began with the work on GCOM-W and is used mainly for Earth observation applications.
- NX-G: Geosynchronous orbit platform for small communication satellites in the 1.5 to 3 t (1.7 to 3.3 tons) range. Based on the work of the WINDS satellite, it will be used mainly for communications applications.

== List of satellites ==
Satellites using the NEXTAR platform.

== See also ==
- DS2000 - Mitsubishi Electric's standard satellite bus
- Star Bus – Another comparable satellite bus made by Orbital ATK.
