= Materials International Space Station Experiment =

NASA science observatories on the orbital research platform

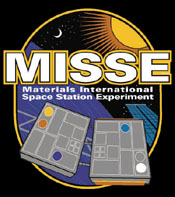
MISSE's logo

The Materials International Space Station Experiment (MISSE) is a series of experiments mounted externally on the International Space Station (ISS) that investigates the effects of long-term exposure of materials to the harsh space environment.

The MISSE project evaluates the performance, stability, and long-term survivability of materials and components planned for use by NASA, commercial companies and the Department of Defense (DOD) on future low Earth orbit (LEO), synchronous orbit and interplanetary space missions. The Long Duration Exposure Facility (LDEF), which was retrieved in 1990 after spending 68 months in LEO, revealed that space environments are very hostile to many spacecraft materials and components. Atomic oxygen, which is the most prevalent atomic species encountered in low earth orbit, is highly reactive with plastics and some metals, causing severe erosion.

There is also extreme ultraviolet radiation due to the lack of an atmospheric filter. This radiation deteriorates and darkens many plastics and coatings. The vacuum in space also alters the physical properties of many materials. Impacts of meteoroids and orbiting man-made debris can damage all materials exposed in space. The combined effects of all of these environments on spacecraft can only be investigated in space. MISSE evaluates materials currently being used and those planned for use in future space missions.

The MISSE program is a direct successor to the Mir Environmental Effects Payloads (MEEPs) that were attached for over a year to the Mir Docking Module of the space station Mir between shuttle flights STS-76 and STS-86; and is a descendant of the Long Duration Exposure Facility. Also MEEPS can trace their inception to the Passive Optical Sample Array (POSA) sample trays flown on STS-1 and STS-2, and their successor Effects of Oxygen Interaction with Materials (EOIM) on STS-3 and STS-5.

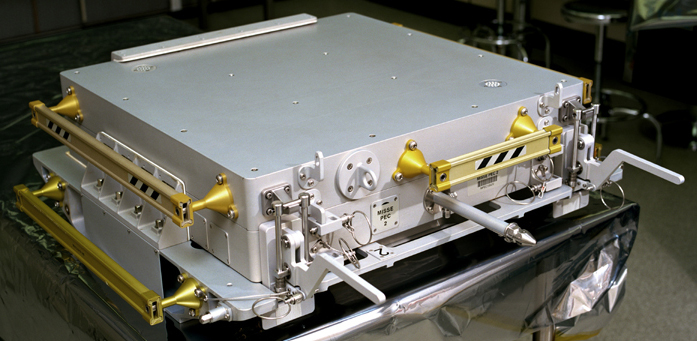
MISSE PEC closed

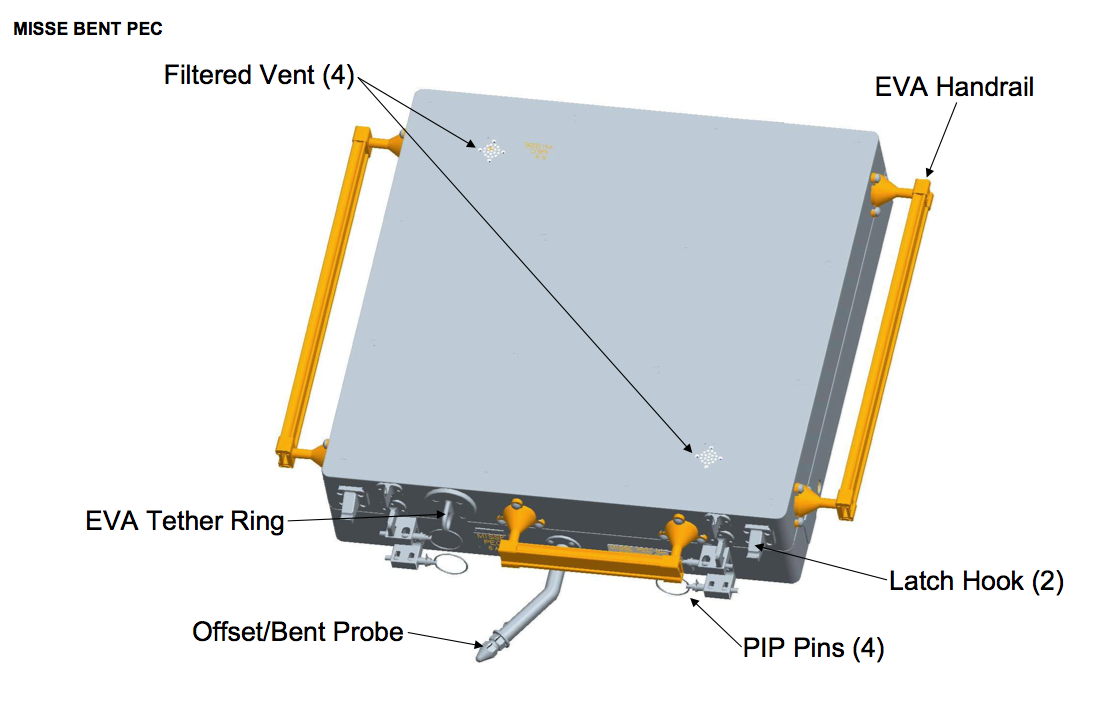
MISSE PEC closed

== Materials tested ==
About 1,508 samples are being tested on the MISSE project. Samples range from components such as switches, sensors and mirrors to materials like polymers, coatings, and composites. There are also biological materials such as seeds, spores and various types of bacteria being evaluated. Each material on the mission had to be individually tested in the laboratory prior to being selected. The ultimate test for the materials is when they are exposed to the space environment. In the laboratory, each material can only be exposed to one particular simulated environment at a time. In space, they are exposed to all of the environments at once. Besides testing new materials, MISSE will also be addressing questions concerning current materials, such as those being used in communication satellites which are being plagued with premature failures of the solar cell power arrays. New generations of solar cells with longer expected lifetimes will also be tested.

MISSE will also be testing coatings used to control heat absorption and emission temperatures of satellites. The hostile environment of space limits the useful life of coatings. New coatings, which are expected to be much more stable in space and therefore have longer useful lives, will be tested. MISSE will also address a major problem for a crewed exploration of Mars: shielding the crew from the very energetic cosmic rays found in interplanetary space. New concepts for lightweight shields will be tested on MISSE. Ultra-light membrane structures are planned for solar sails, large inflatable mirrors and lenses. The effects of micrometeoroid impacts on these materials will also be investigated.

MISSE data (MISSE 1 - 7) is now open to the public through a registered account at http://materialsinspace.nasa.gov/. Where possible NASA has tried to collect past MISSE experiments and make the data available to the public. Data is still being collected from researchers and added to the MISSE database.

== Deploying MISSE ==
The materials selected for the mission are placed into briefcase-like Passive Experiment Containers (PECs). The PECs are used for transporting experiments to and from ISS. During an EVA they are placed on handrails or at an exposed experiment facility of the ISS. The containers are opened fully (360°) so the two surfaces with experiments are facing in opposite directions. The experiments are photographed several times during their stay outside if possible, usually whenever an opportunity arises due to a scheduled EVA. After exposure in space, MISSE is retrieved in the same manner as it was deployed, the material samples are tested to see if they still have the unique properties needed to complete space missions. MISSEs have active and passive detectors to give a time-history reading, or a reading of what happened to the materials at certain points in time. Back on the ground, tests will be conducted to determine the effects of its exposure. These tests will determine which materials are strong enough to survive in space.

Originally it was planned to have MISSE-1 and 2 deployed for about a year and MISSE-3 and 4 for up to three years. Due to the grounding of the shuttle fleet after the Space Shuttle Columbia disaster required that changes be made to these plans. MISSEs 1 and 2 provided the three-year data and MISSEs 3 and 4 have provided the one-year data.

== MISSE-1 and MISSE-2 ==
The first and second set of experiments was launched by Space Shuttle Discovery, during mission STS-105, on 10 August 2001 and contained 910 specimens of various materials. It was installed in two separate airlock handrails located on the Quest Joint Airlock and high-pressure gas tanks.

On 30 July 2005, during the first EVA of mission STS-114, both experiments were retrieved.

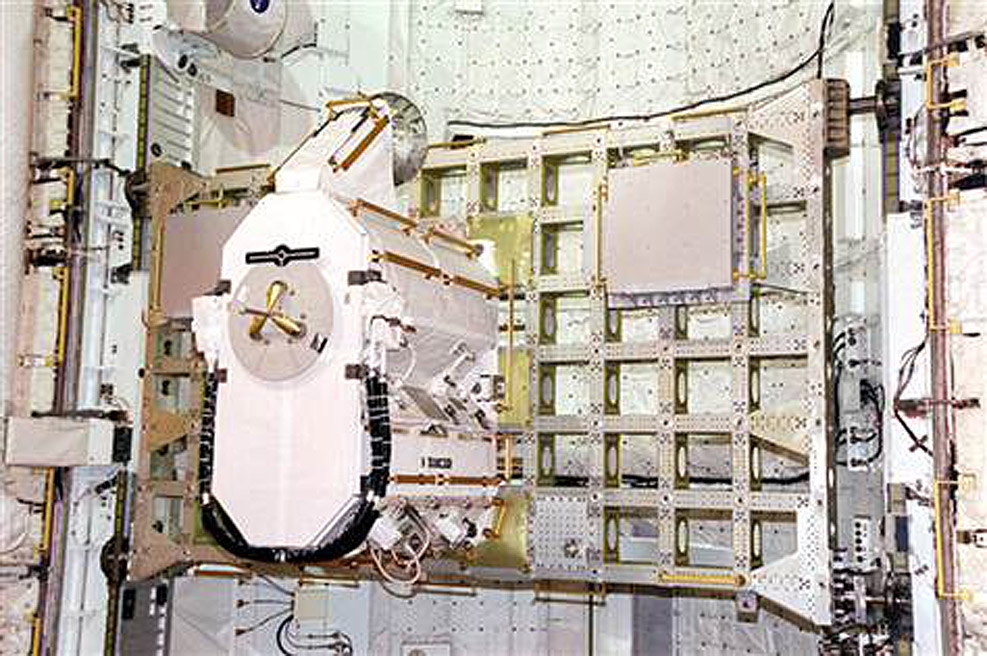
ICC STS-105 carrying MISSE-1 & 2

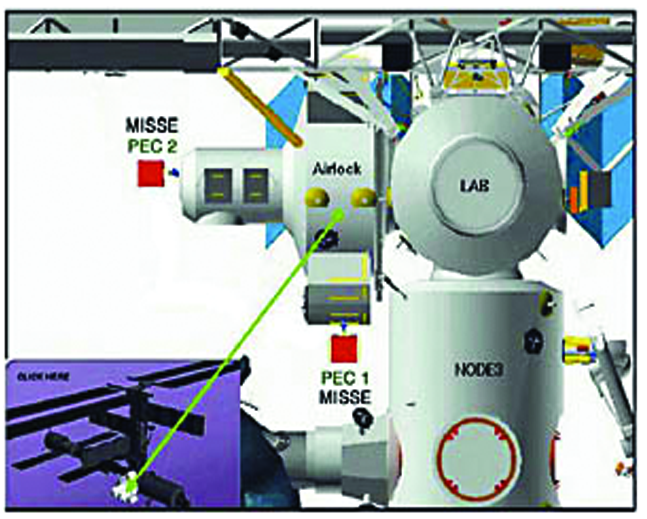
MISSE PEC1 & 2 mounts on Quest

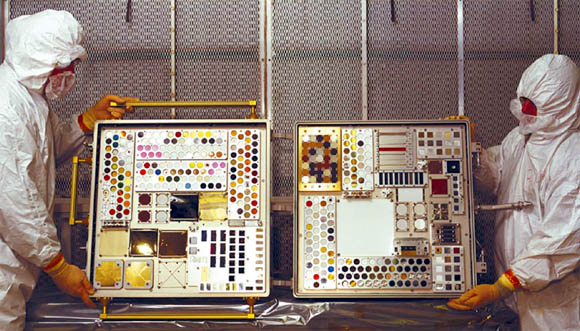
MISSE PEC1

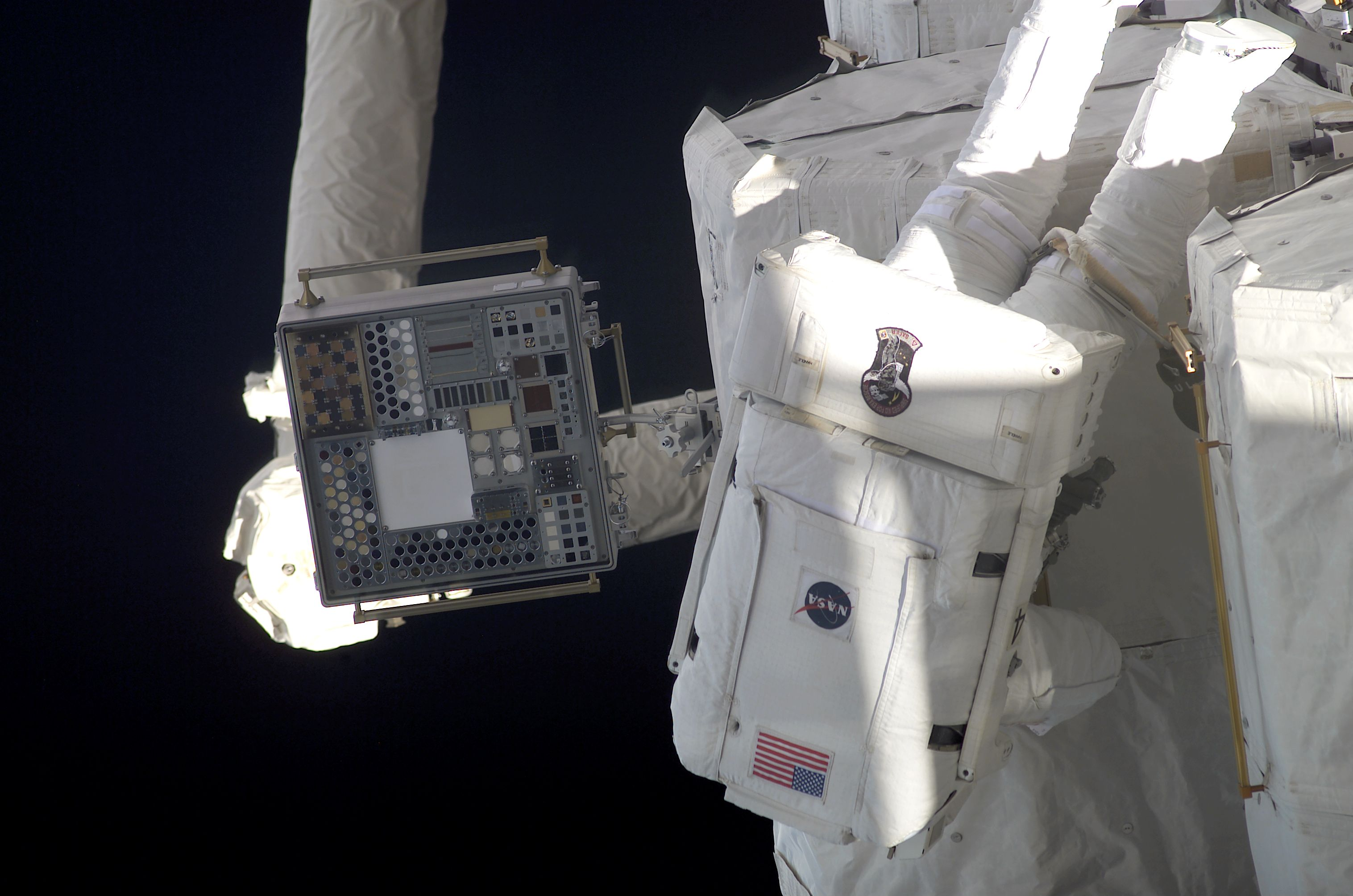
MISSE PEC1 mounted on Quest

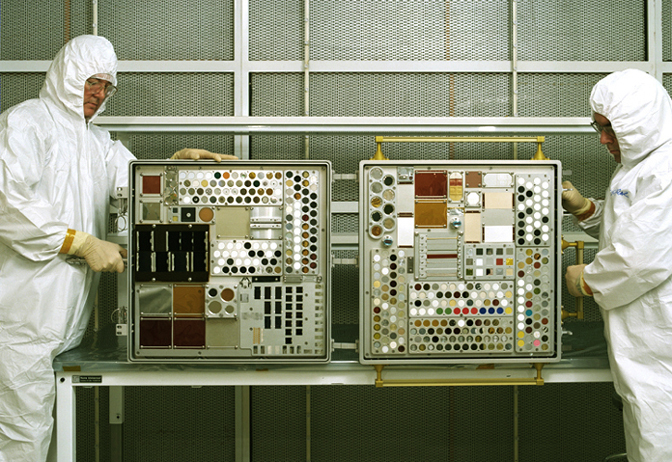
MISSE PEC2

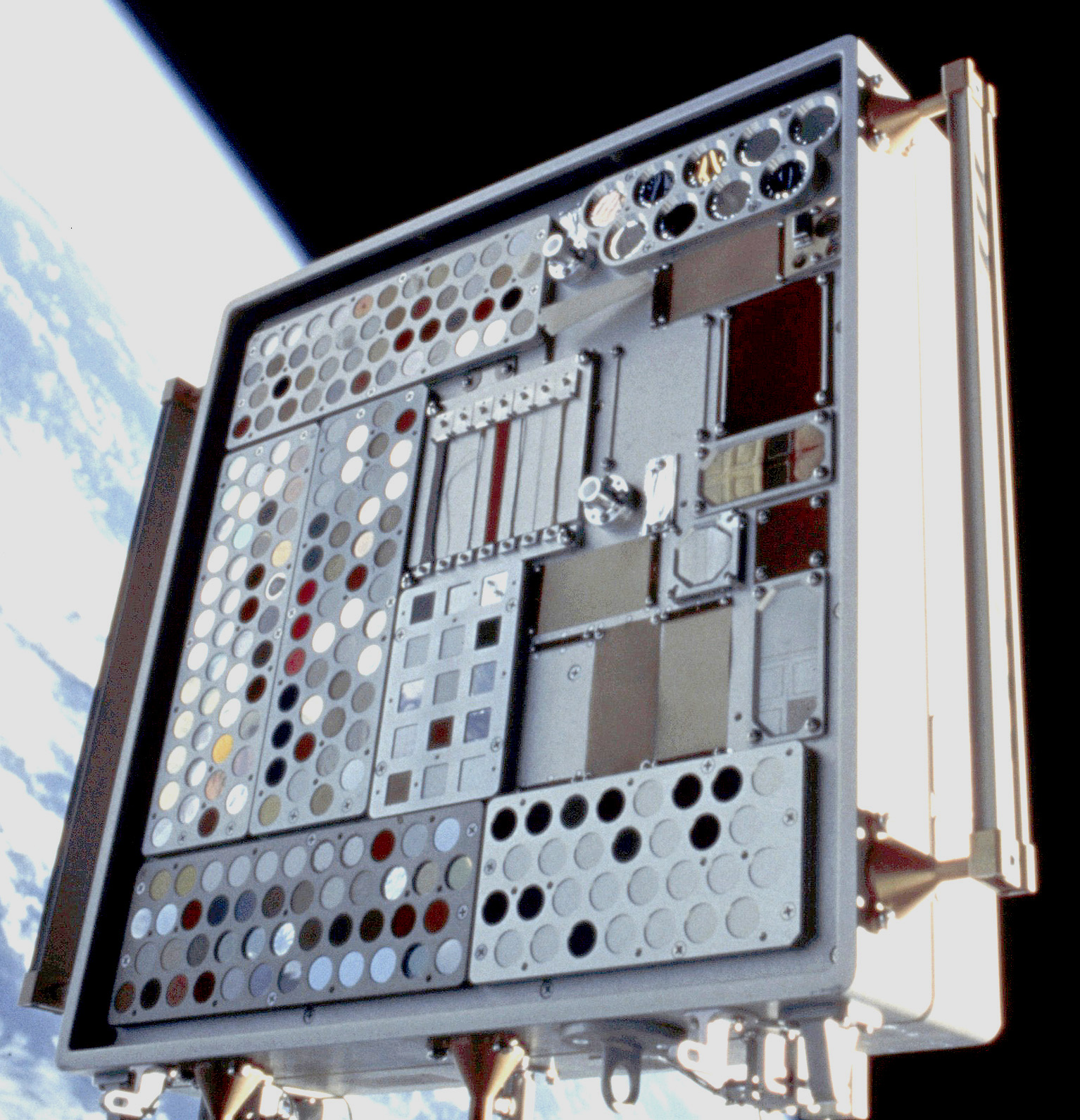
A view of MISSE PEC2 mounted on Quest

== MISSE-5 ==
This was the third MISSE experiment launched, although the fifth MISSE PEC. MISSE-5 was launched by Space Shuttle Discovery on mission STS-114, on 26 July 2005 and contained 254 specimens of various materials. It was installed on the P6 truss and a year later, during the third EVA of mission STS-115 on 15 September 2006, the MISSE-5 package was retrieved.

MISSE-5 contained three investigations. One experiment the Forward Technology Solar Cell Experiment (FTSCE), a performance test of 36 solar cells for use on future spacecraft. The second investigation measured the degradation of more than 200 flexible materials in the space environment. The third experiment involved the PCSat-2 that provided a communications system and tested the Amateur Satellite Service off-the-shelf solution for telemetry command and control. MISSE-5 was the first active experiment of the MISSE series. It required power and could communicate with the ground through PCSat-2.

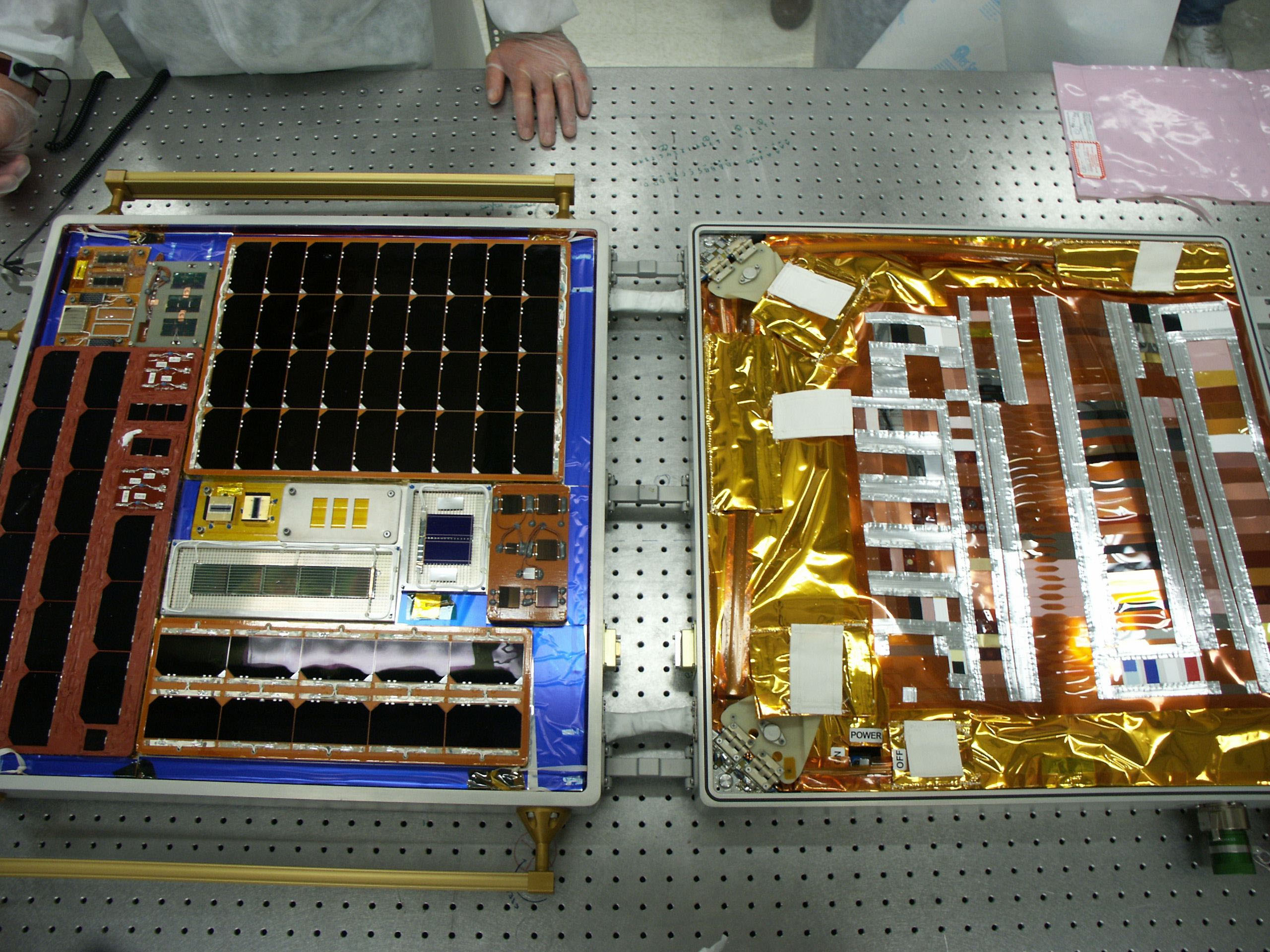
MISSE PEC5 being prepared for launch. On the left is FTCSE, on the right PcSat-2 covered and by a golden thermal blanket with the flexible materials samples

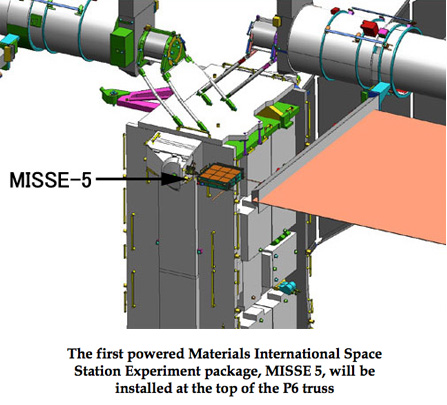
MISSE PEC5 on the end of the P6 Truss

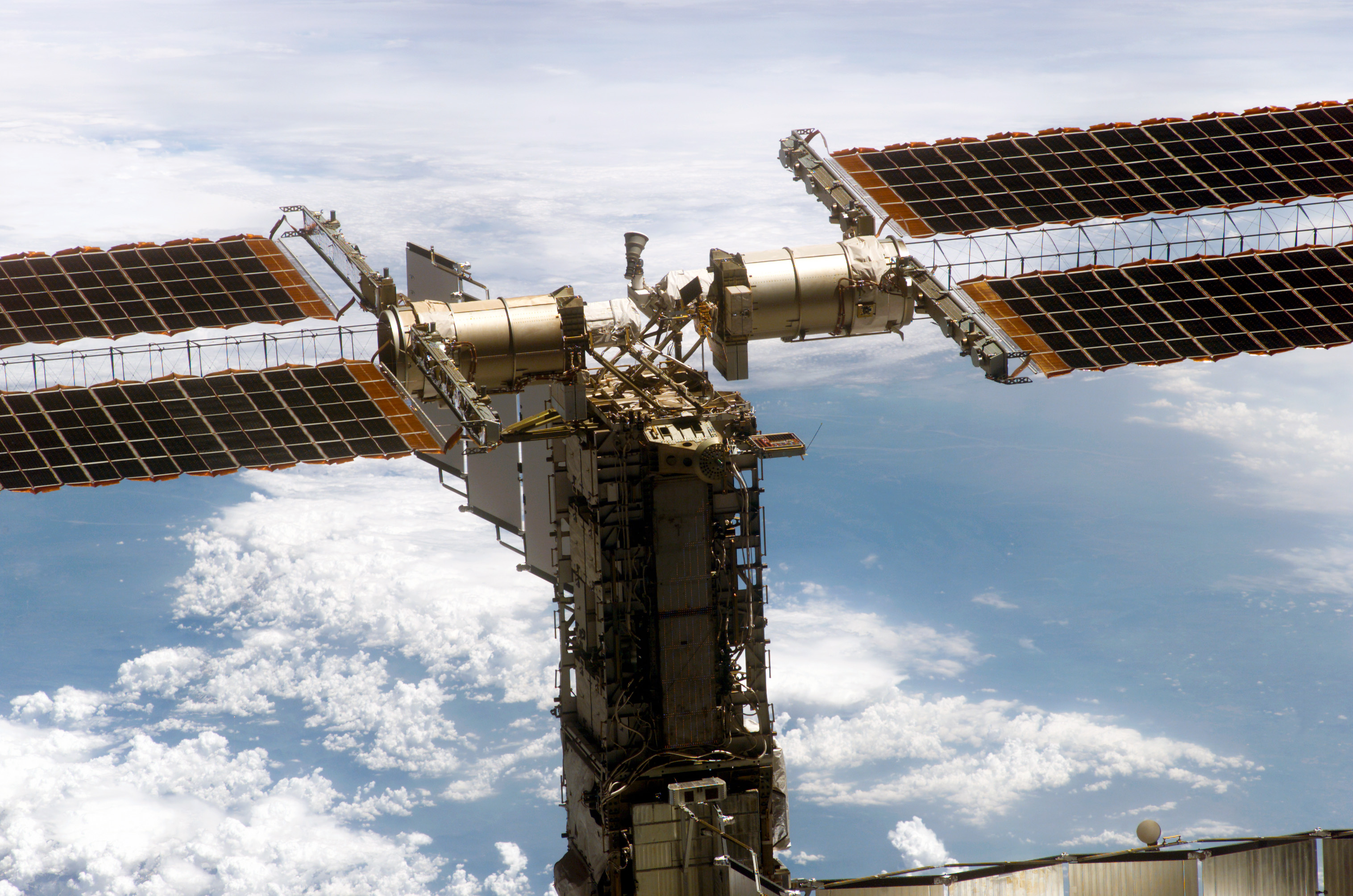
MISSE PEC5 on the end of P6 Truss

== MISSE-3 and MISSE-4 ==
The fourth and fifth set of MISSE experiments (MISSE PEC3 and MISSE PEC4) were launched by Space Shuttle Discovery, during mission STS-121, on 3 August 2006 and contained 875 specimens of various materials. The MISSE-3 was installed on one of the high-pressure tanks around the crew lock and the MISSE-4 on the outboard end of the Quest Joint Airlock by the Expedition 13's crew. A year later, during the fourth EVA of mission STS-118 on 18 August 2007, the MISSE-3 and 4 experiments were retrieved.

MISSEs 3 and 4 also served an educational purpose, it flew approximately eight million basil seeds that were given to children for science experiments, in order to stimulate interest in space science.

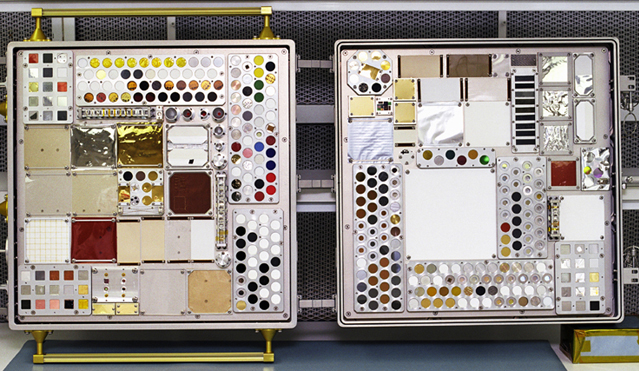
MISSE PEC3

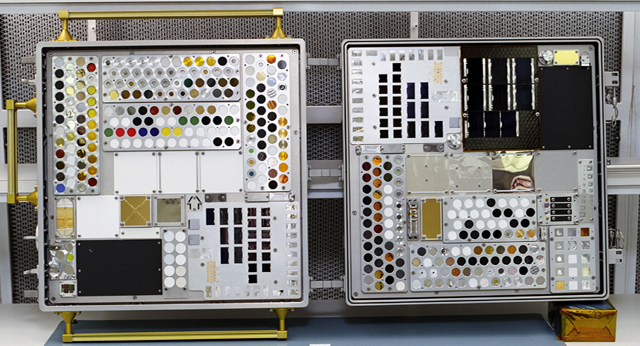
MISSE PEC4

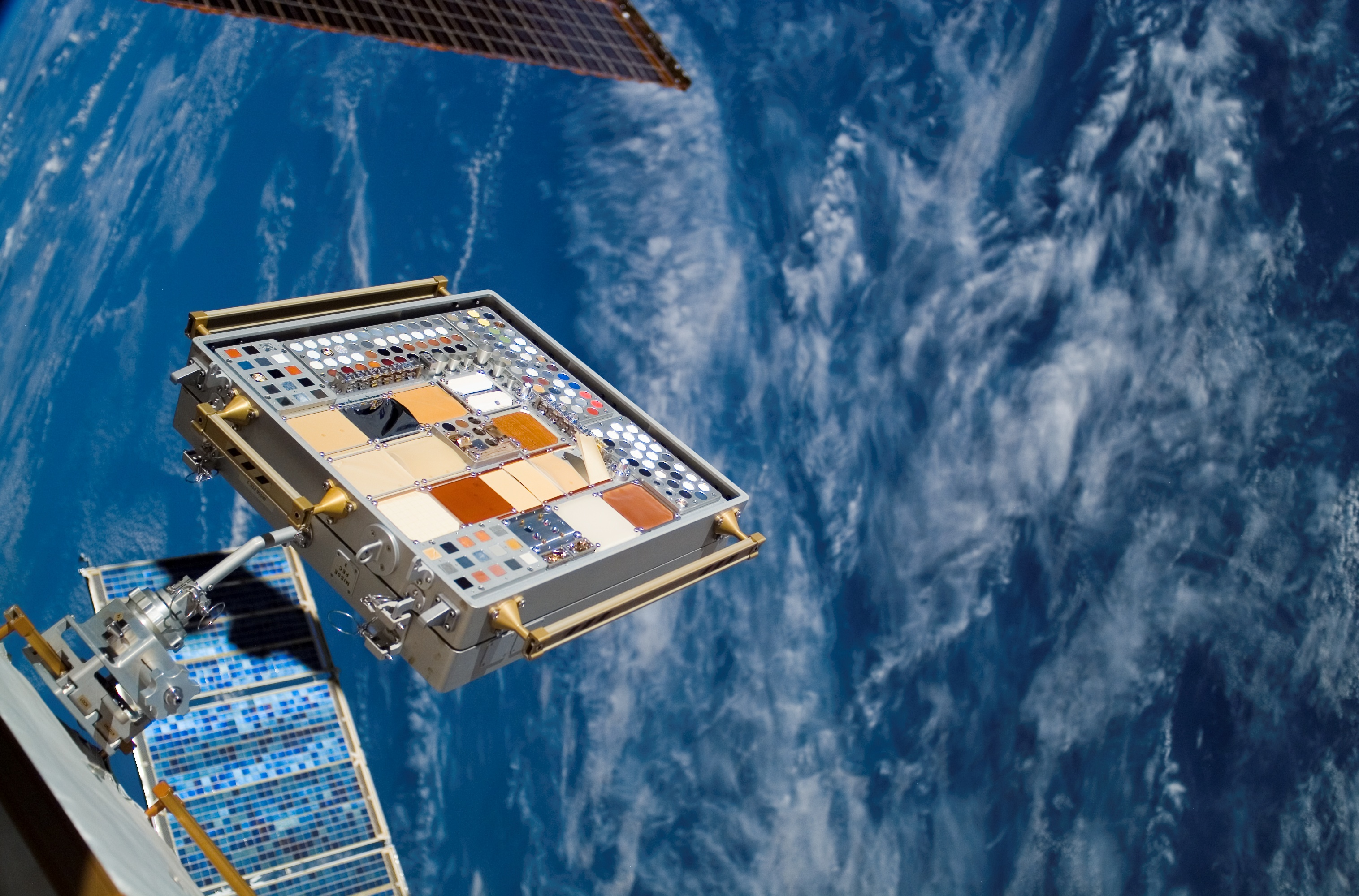
MISSE-3 just before retrieval during STS-118

== MISSE-6 ==
The sixth set of MISSE experiments, labeled 6A and 6B, were launched by Space Shuttle Endeavour, during mission STS-123, on 13 March 2008 and contain over 400 specimens of various materials. It was installed on the Columbus External Payload Facility. Installation was attempted during the third EVA, however the case did not initially fit onto the bracket. It was successfully installed during the fifth EVA.

Both MISSE 6A and 6B were retrieved during the first EVA of mission STS-128 and returned to Earth in September 2009.

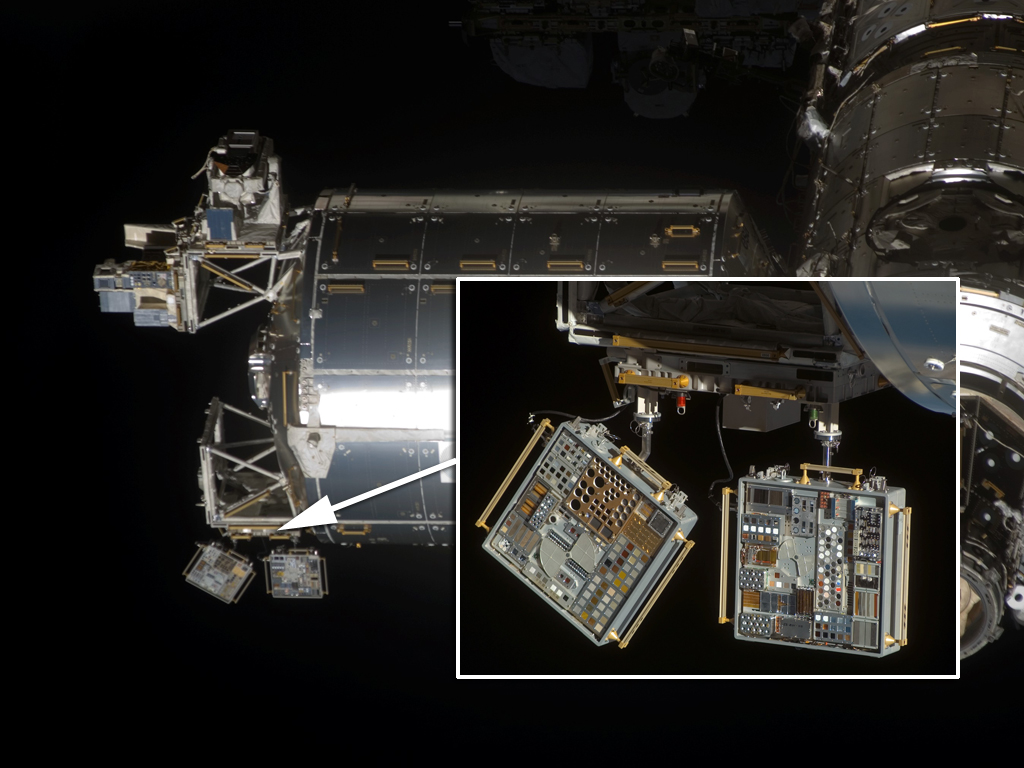
MISSE PEC6A & 6B on the Columbus Module

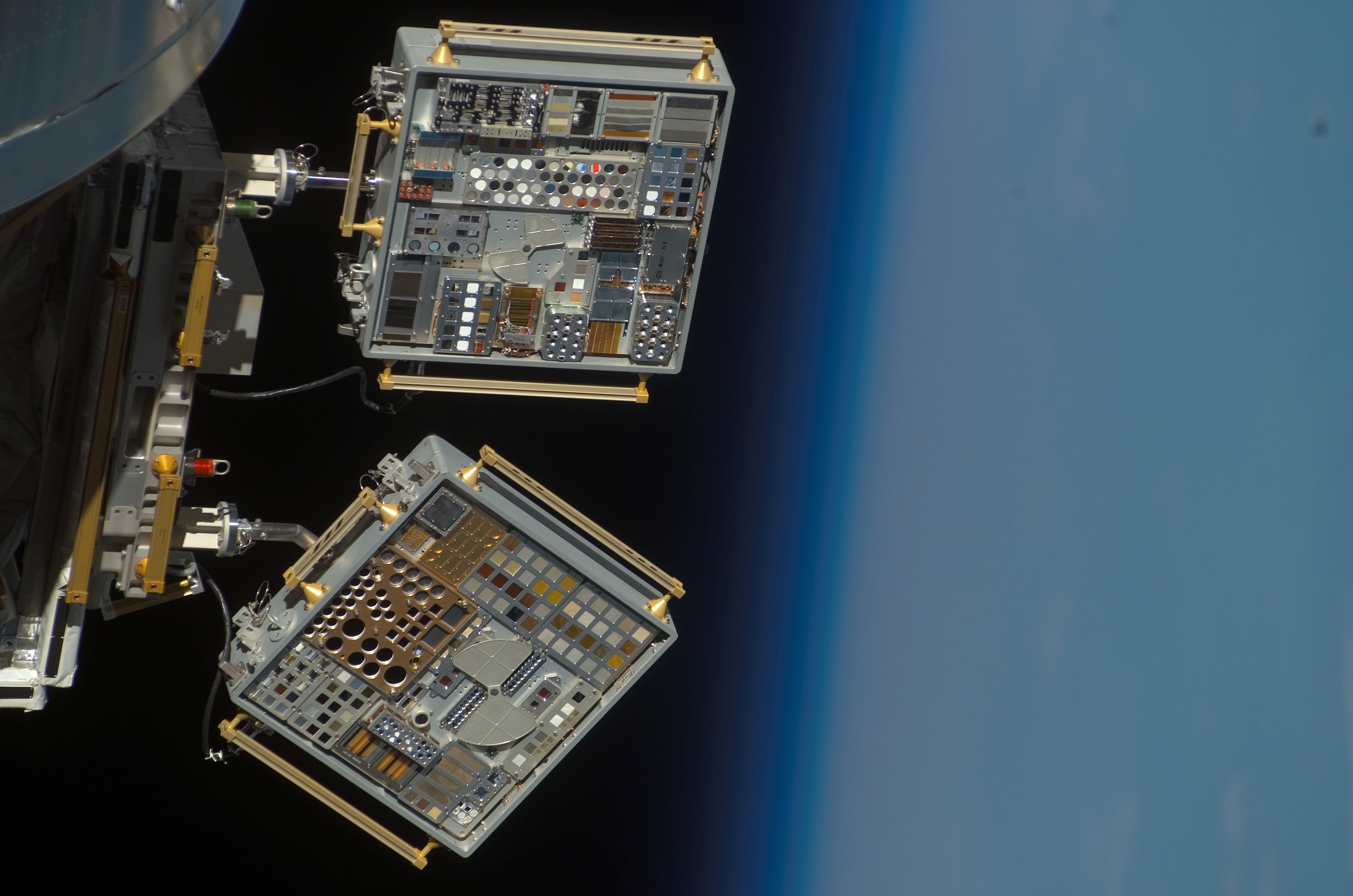
MISSE PEC6A & 6B

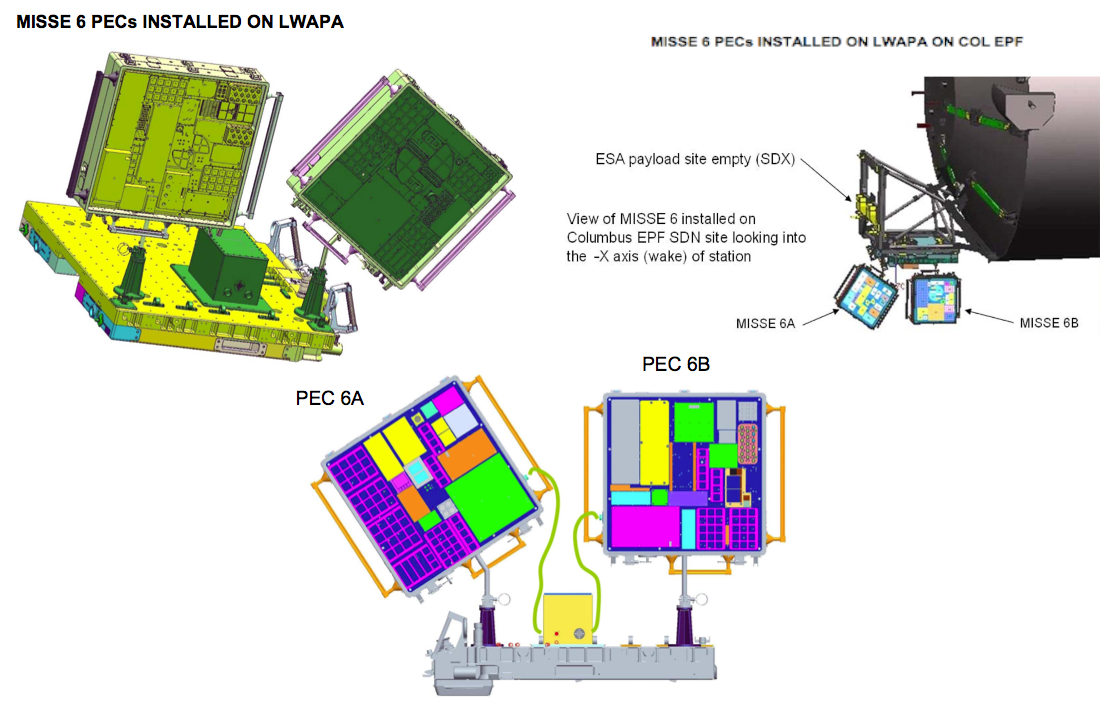
Image of MISSE PEC6A & 6B artwork

== MISSE-7 ==
The seventh set of MISSE experiments was located on an ExPRESS payload adapter (ExPA) on ExPRESS Logistics Carrier 2. They were brought to the station (on ELC-2) in November 2009 aboard mission STS-129.

MISSE-7 is composed of two suitcase-sized Passive Experiment Containers (PECs), identified as MISSE 7A and MISSE 7B. Once installed in the exterior of ISS by space walking astronauts, the PECs were opened. The orientation of MISSE 7A was space facing/Earth facing while MISSE 7B faced forward/backward relative to the ISS orbit. Both MISSE 7A and MISSE 7B contained active and passive experiments. Passive experiments are designed for pre- and post-flight evaluation in ground-based laboratories. Being a first in the MISSE program, active experiments are designed to interface with the power and communication systems on ISS allowing data to be transmitted back to Earth.

MISSE-7 also contained experiments mounted to its ExPA base. These experiments included SpaceCube which was developed by engineers at the NASA Goddard Space Flight Center and is a reconfigurable, high-performance system based on Xilinx's Virtex-4 commercial FPGAs designed for spaceflight applications requiring compute intensive on-board processing. The MISSE-7 SpaceCube's purpose was to serve as an "on-orbit" test-bed for demonstrating "radiation hardened by software" program execution and error detection and correction techniques that will help enable the use of commercial processing devices in space.

The active experiments on 7A included the Single Events Upset Xilinx-Sandia Experiment which detected radiation effects on active FPGA circuits and detected more upset events at high latitudes and in the South Atlantic Anomaly.

The Naval Research Laboratory handled primary responsibility for MISSE 7A, while the Air Force Research Laboratory, NASA, Boeing, other industry collaborators, and academia had experiments on MISSE 7B.

The two PECs were collected for return to Earth during the STS-134 mission.

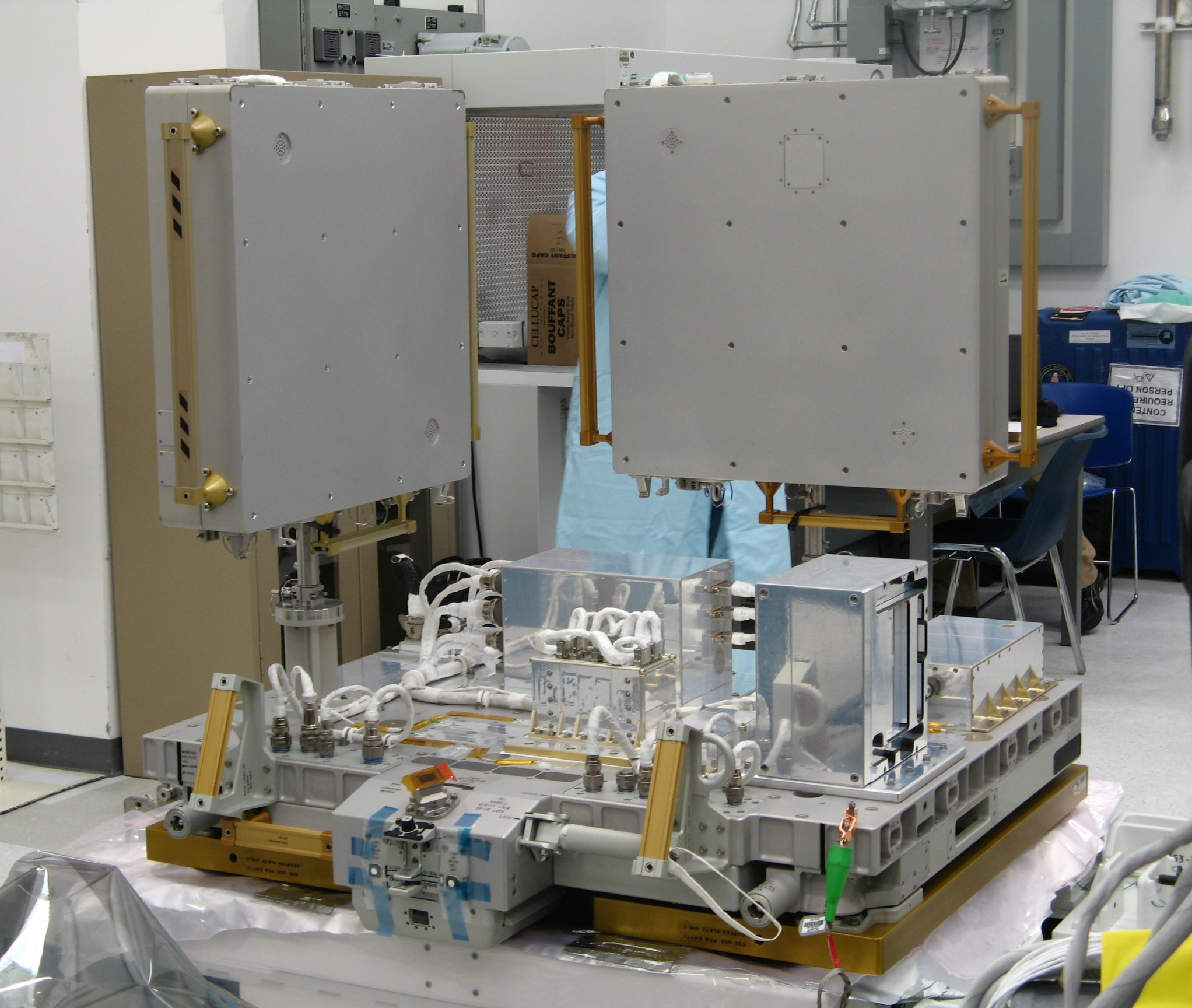
MISSE-7 prior to launch with the two Passive Experiment Containers mounted on the ExPA platform

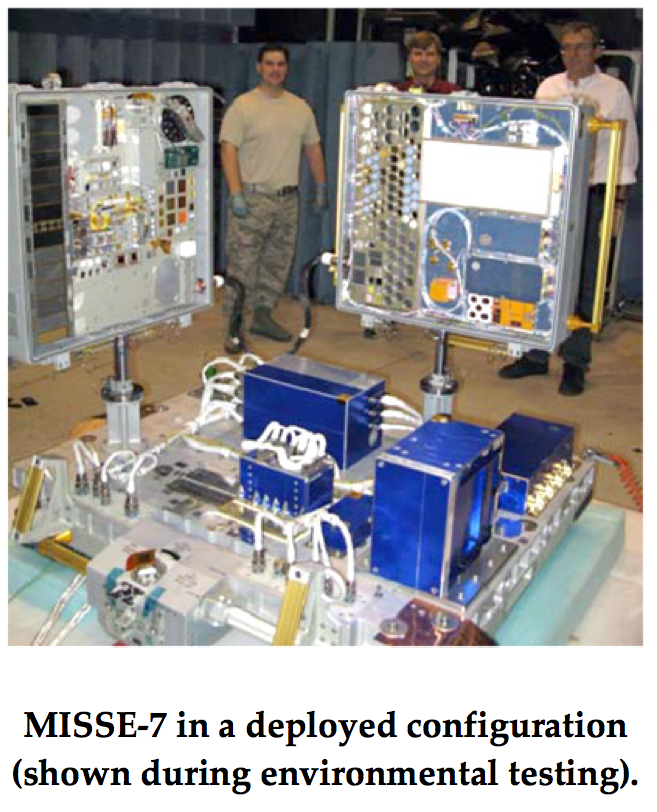
MISSE PEC7A & 7B

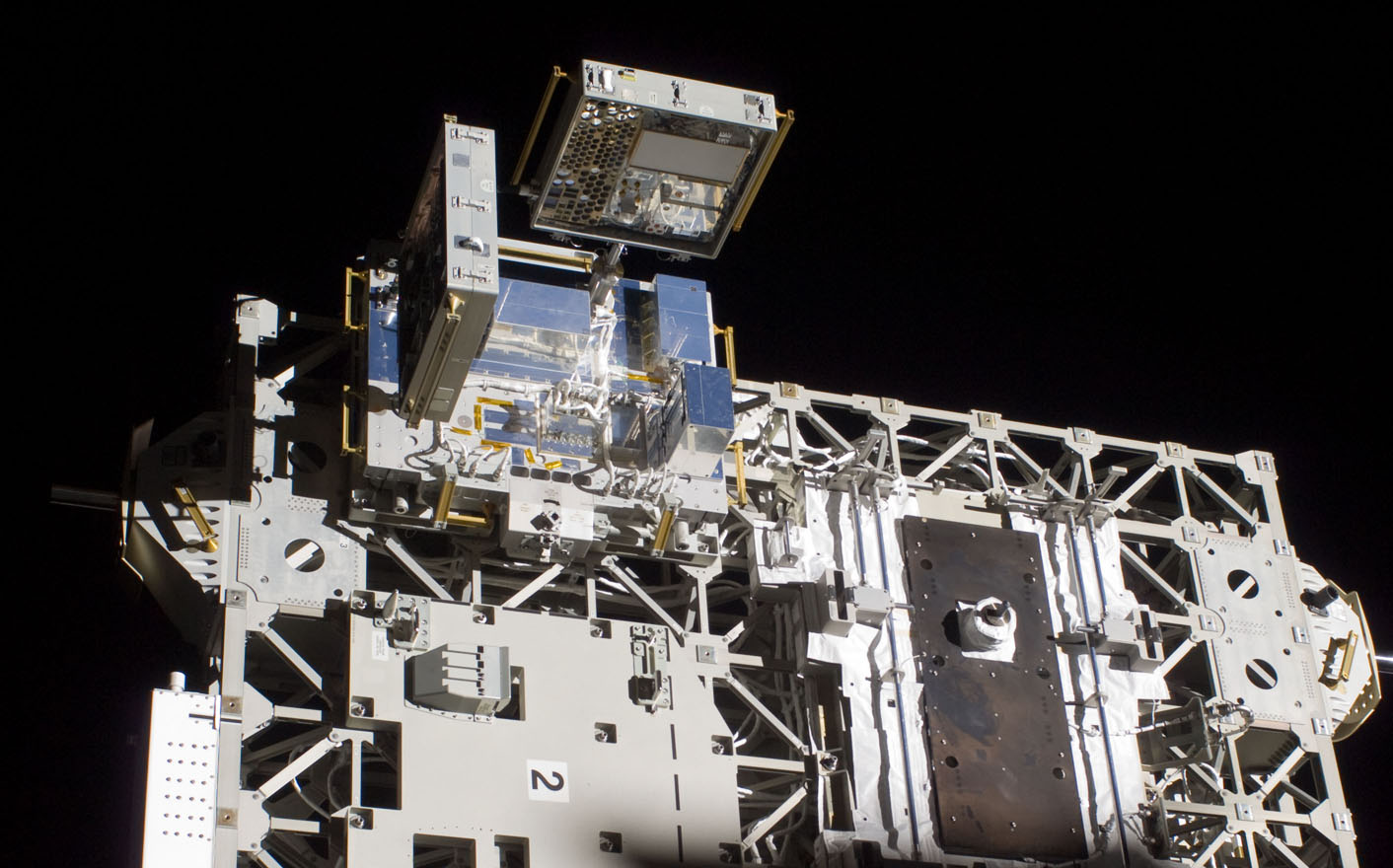
MISSE PEC7A & 7B on ELC-2

=== MISSE-7 Experiments ===
- SpaceCube is a small, light-weight, reconfigurable multi-processor platform for space flight applications demanding extreme processing capabilities. It utilizes a stackable architecture and is based on Xilinx Virtex 4 FX60 FPGAs (2 per processor card). The SpaceCube's first mission was on Hubble Servicing Mission 4 as part of the Relative Navigation Sensors experiment. The SpaceCube will provide an on-orbit test platform for demonstrating innovative radiation hardened by software techniques.

== MISSE-8 ==
The STS-134 mission, launched May 2011, delivered the MISSE PEC8 experiment and returned MISSE PEC7A & PEC7B to earth. MISSE-7 had been on the ISS since its delivery on STS-129.

On STS-134 MISSE-8 was only one PEC, STS-135 crewmen added the MISSE-8 ORMatE-III exposure plate to the second MISSE mount.

MISSE-8 PEC and ORMatE-III exposure plate were scheduled to be retrieved on Feb. 2014 via EVA. They were returned inside the SpaceX Dragon capsule as part of the SpX-3 mission.

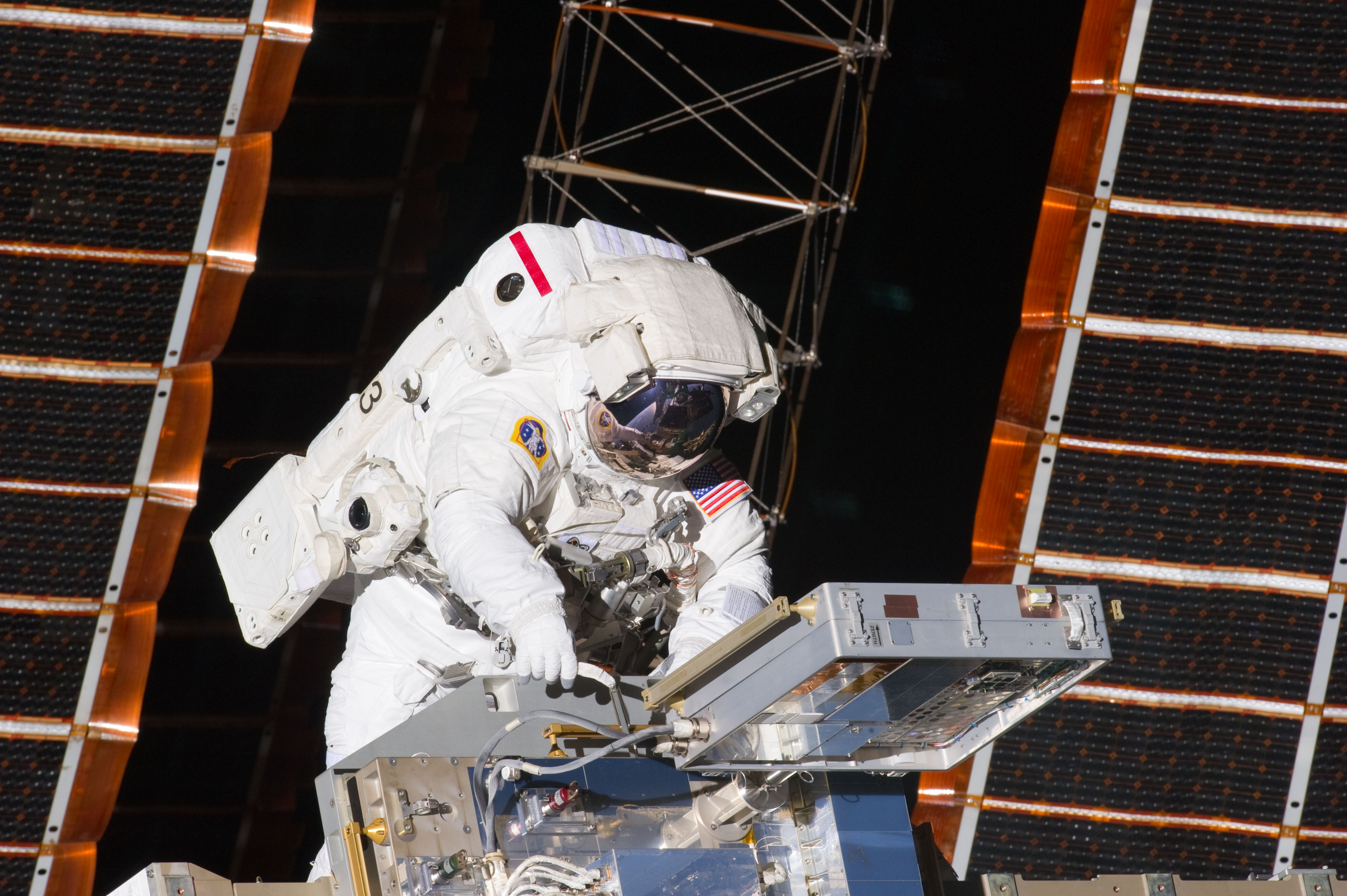
Astronaut Andrew Feustel swaps the MISSE PEC7A & 7B with PEC8 STS-134

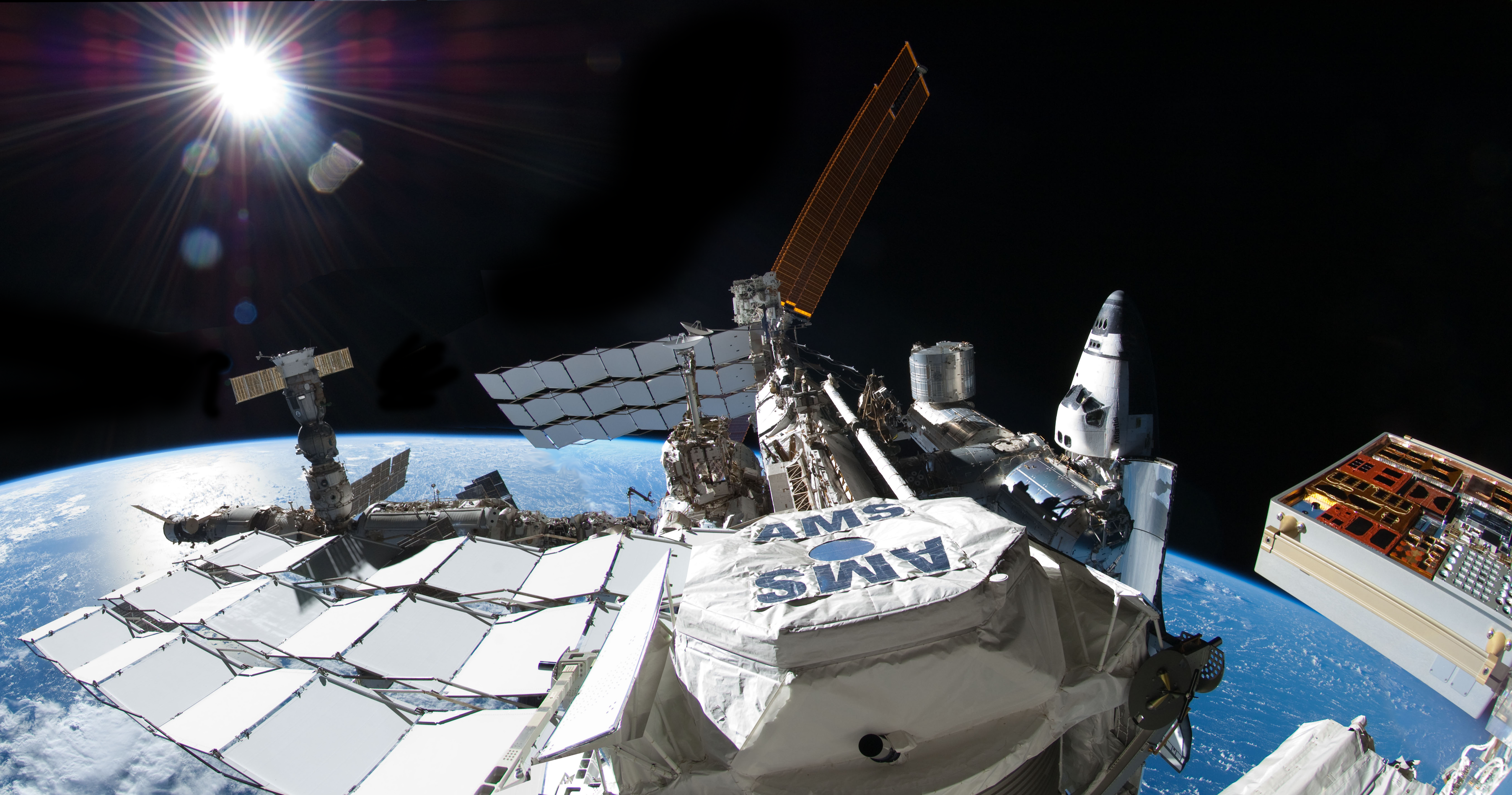
A composite of photos taken during an STS-135 EVA of the overall ISS from ELC-2, note MISSE-8 PEC on the right

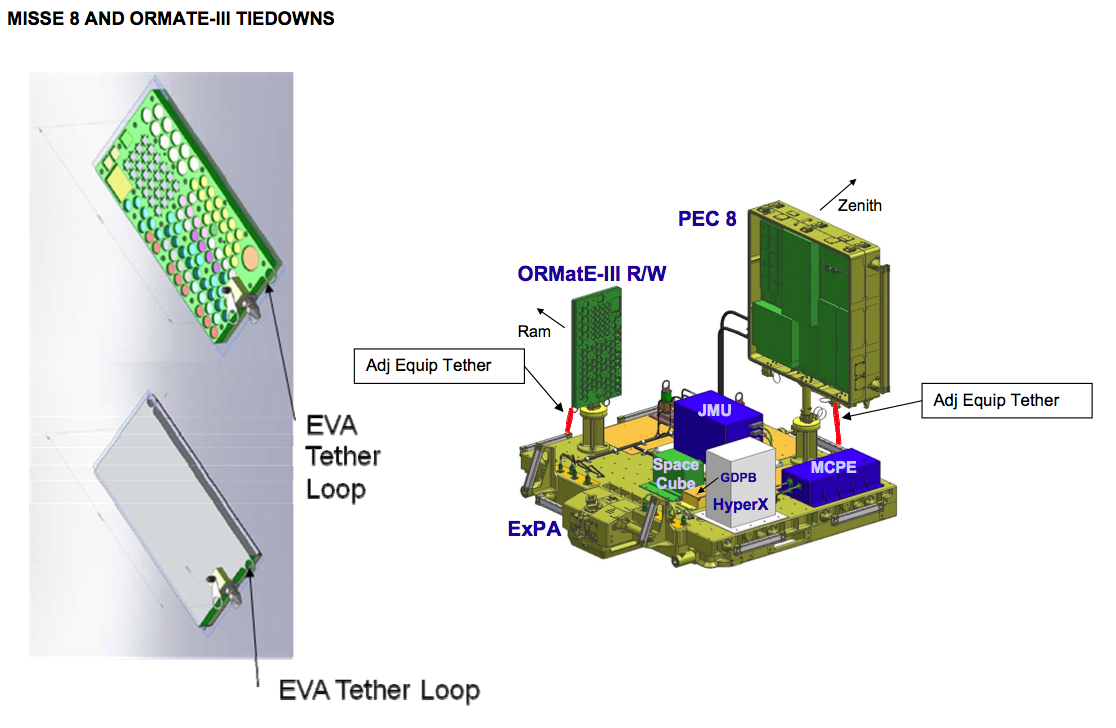
MISSE-8 & the ORMatE-III plate design

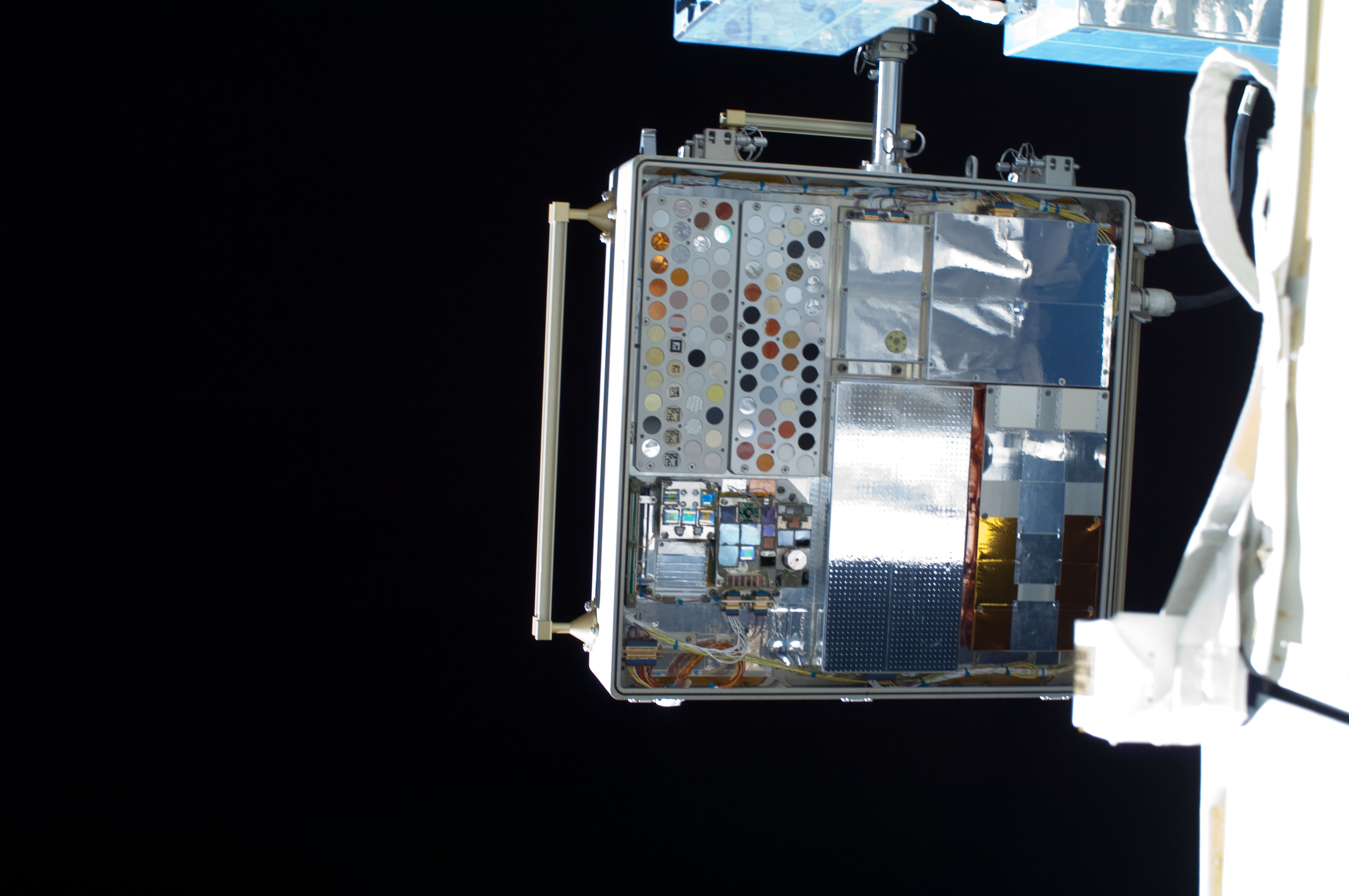
MISSE-8 as photographed by Ron Garan STS-135

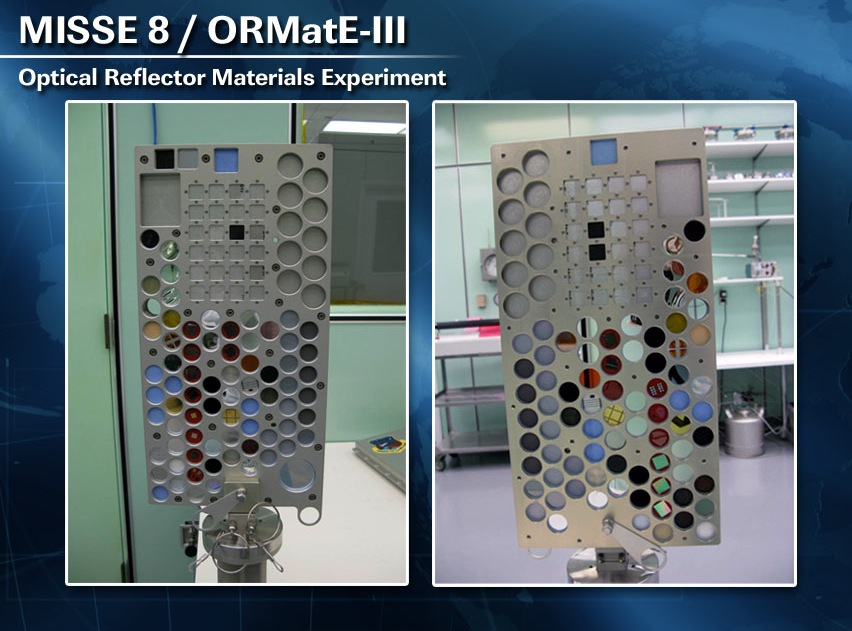
MISSE-8 ORMatE-III plate from NASA Select TV

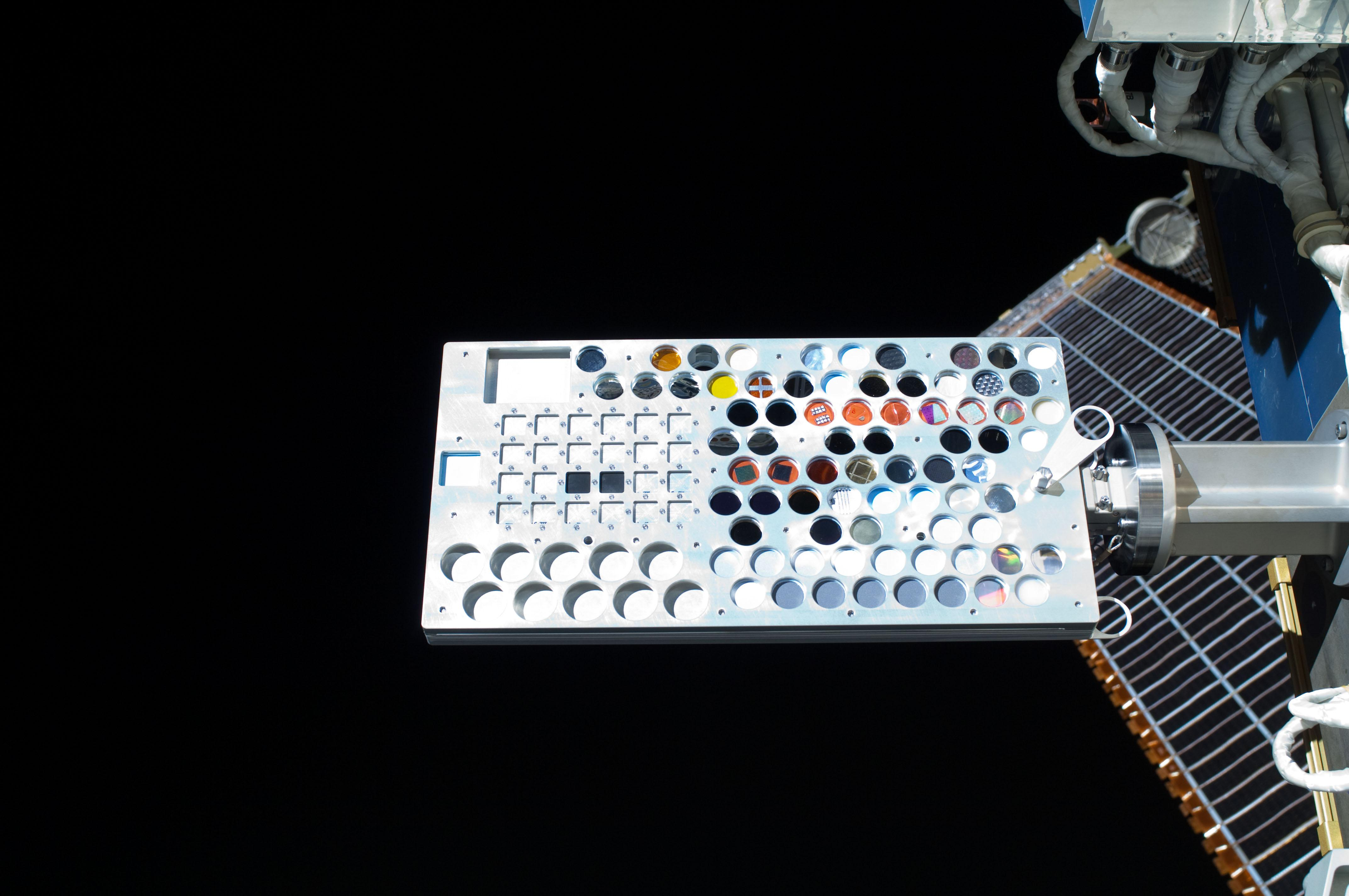
MISSE-8 ORMatE-III exposure plate placed on ELC-2 during a spacewalk STS-135

== MISSE-FF ==
The Materials ISS Experiment Flight Facility (MISSE-FF) platform provides the ability to test materials, coatings, and components or other larger experiments in the harsh environment of space, which is virtually impossible to do collectively on Earth. Testing in low-Earth orbit (LEO) allows the integrated testing of how materials react to exposure to ultraviolet radiation (UV), atomic oxygen (AO), ionizing radiation, ultrahigh vacuum (UHV), charged particles, thermal cycles, electromagnetic radiation, and micro-meteoroids in the LEO environment.

MISSE-FF is a continuation of the l MISSE 1 through MISSE 8 flight payloads, but is a completely new design that eliminates the need for Extravehicular Activities (EVA) for MISSE operations. MISSE-FF is a cooperative endeavor between Alpha Space and the ISS Program, and is designed with a base-structure and avionics that reside on the ISS for the duration of ISS. MISSE Sample Carriers (MSCs) are attached, and later retrieved using the ISS Canadarm 2. MSCs are launched up to the facility, and then returned to Earth at the end of the testing period. MISSE-FF is operated robotically from the ground with no planned crew interfaces required for facility operations, except for loading future MISSE Sample Carriers (MSCs) on the transfer tray for transporting the MSC's through the JEM airlock, and subsequently unloading MSCs from the transfer tray and preparing MSCs for return to Earth. The facility is a development of new technology and systems not previously available to the materials science community. A new feature, not available in the past, is the ability of each MSC to take pictures of each sample on a monthly basis (or more often if required) which is provided to each Principal Investigator to monitor the status of their sample/experiment throughout its time on orbit. MISSE MSCs also offers power and data options for experiments that require data collection and/or power for their experiments. MISSE-FF offers four space viewing directions for testing of samples or experiments: Ram (view forward as the ISS moves in its orbit), Wake (viewing behind the ISS similar to the wake of a boat in water), Zenith (viewing away from earth into deep space and toward the sun), and Nadir (viewing down toward the earth). Scientists test for material, or component durability, such as accelerated degradation, space contamination adherence, and mass loss.

== Participants in MISSE ==
The MISSE Project is a cooperative endeavor managed by NASA Langley Research Center. Participants include: NASA Johnson Space Center, NASA Marshall Space Flight Center, NASA Glenn Research Center, the Jet Propulsion Laboratory, the Materials Laboratory at the Air Force Research Laboratory, the Naval Research Laboratory, Infosight Corporation and the Boeing Phantom Works. Shuttle/ISS MISSE integration is performed by the USAF's DoD Space Shuttle and ISS Payload Integration Directorate.
