= WINDS =

Defunct Japanese communication satellite

WINDS (Kizuna)
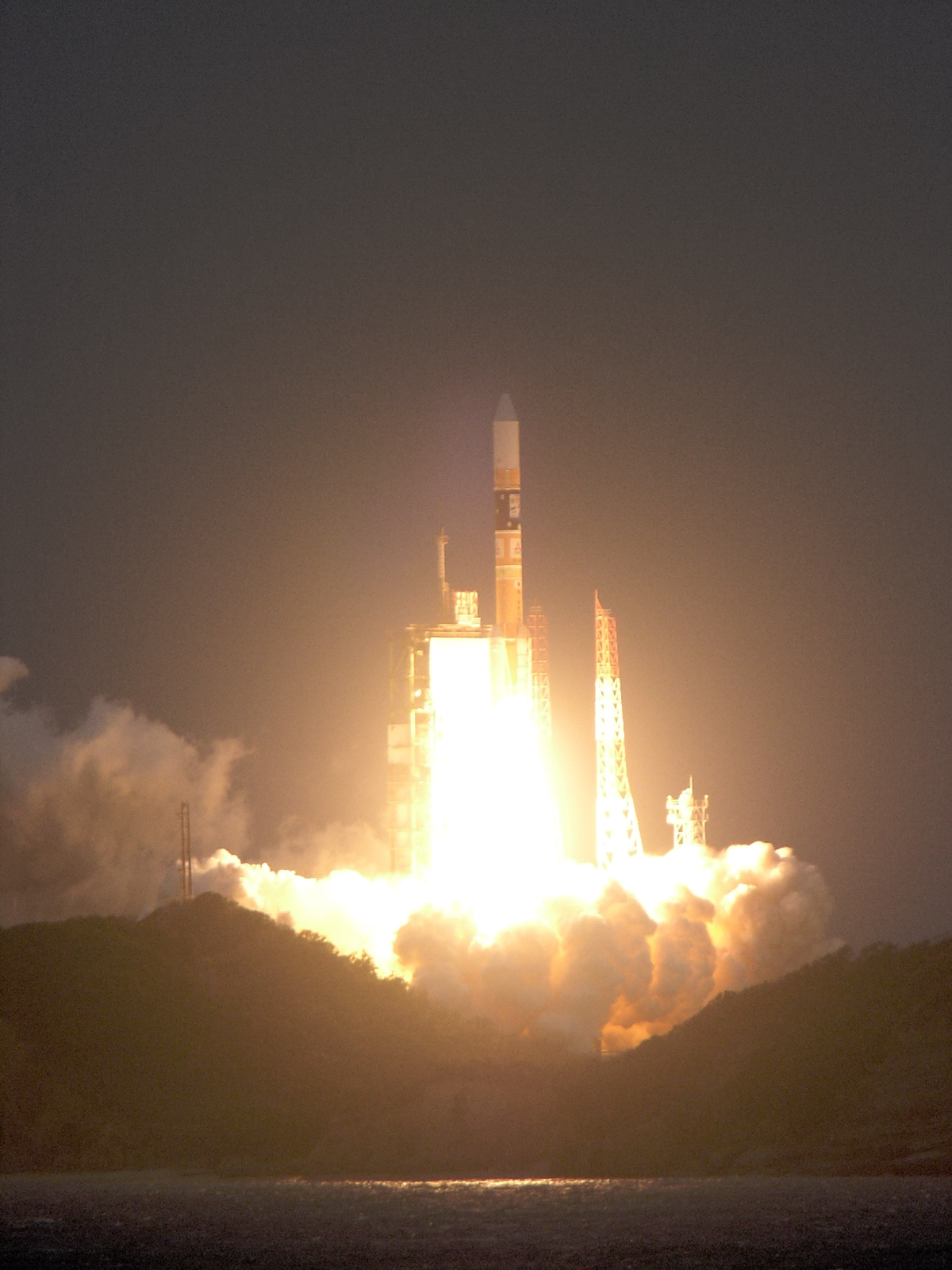
- Launch of WINDS (Kizuna) on H-IIA Flight 14.
- Mission type: Communication
- Operator: JAXA/NICT
- COSPAR ID: 2008-007A
- SATCAT no.: 32500
- Website: JAXA
- Mission duration: 5 years (design); Final: 11 years, 4 days

Spacecraft properties
- Bus: NX-G
- Manufacturer: NEC
- Launch mass: 4,850 kilograms (10,690 lb)
- BOL mass: 2,750 kilograms (6,060 lb)

Start of mission
- Launch date: 23 February 2008, 08:55 UTC
- Rocket: H-IIA
- Launch site: Tanegashima Y1
- Contractor: Mitsubishi

End of mission
- Disposal: Decommissioned
- Deactivated: 27 February 2019, 06:54 UTC

Orbital parameters
- Reference system: Geocentric
- Regime: Geostationary
- Longitude: 143° East
- Semi-major axis: 42,164 kilometres (26,199 mi)
- Perigee altitude: 35,784.1 kilometres (22,235.2 mi)
- Apogee altitude: 35,803.8 kilometres (22,247.4 mi)
- Inclination: 0.2 °
- Period: 1,436.1 minutes

WINDS (Wideband InterNetworking engineering test and Demonstration Satellite, also known as Kizuna) was a Japanese communication satellite. Launched in February 2008, it was designed to demonstrate high-speed broadband communications using Ka-band technology. The satellite tested high-capacity data transmission between Japan and other parts of the Asia-Pacific region, including remote and underserved areas.

== Purpose ==
In 2008, JAXA announced that WINDS had carried out what it described as the world's fastest satellite data communication, at 1.2 Gbit/s, and had delivered the world's fastest satellite internet connection to a 45 cm user terminal. In May 2008, it also reported data communication at 622 Mbit/s through the satellite's Active Phased Array Antenna (APAA). The APAA was the first hopping spot-beam antenna developed in JAXA. It is a direct-radiating phased array that transmits at about 18 GHz and receives at 28 GHz in the Ka band, with a mass of 183 kg. A complementary multi-beam antenna allowed WINDS to cover a large area with its beams. The satellite was intended to conduct experiments with user organizations in Japan and the Asia–Pacific region.

After the Tohoku earthquake and tsunami of 11 March 2011, JAXA and NICT used WINDS to establish a broadband communication environment in the stricken areas. At the request of the Ministry of Education, Culture, Sports, Science and Technology, which had received a petition from Iwate Prefecture, JAXA installed a movable ground antenna at the Iwate Prefectural Office, the disaster-measures headquarters, and another in Kamaishi City, at the local disaster-measures office. The movable VSAT terminals used 1.0 m antennas. JAXA said the activity was part of its ongoing development of broadband satellite communications for disaster response. In January 2013, JAXA and the Japan Medical Association signed an agreement to conduct joint application experiments with WINDS in support of disaster medicine.

Prior to launch, a JAXA brochure claimed that WINDS will be able to provide 155 Mbit/s download speeds to home users with 45-centimetre diameter satellite dishes, while providing industrial users via 5-metre diameter dishes with 1.2 Gbit/s speeds.

== See also ==
- H-IIA
- JAXA
- Satellite Internet access
