= SpaceCube =

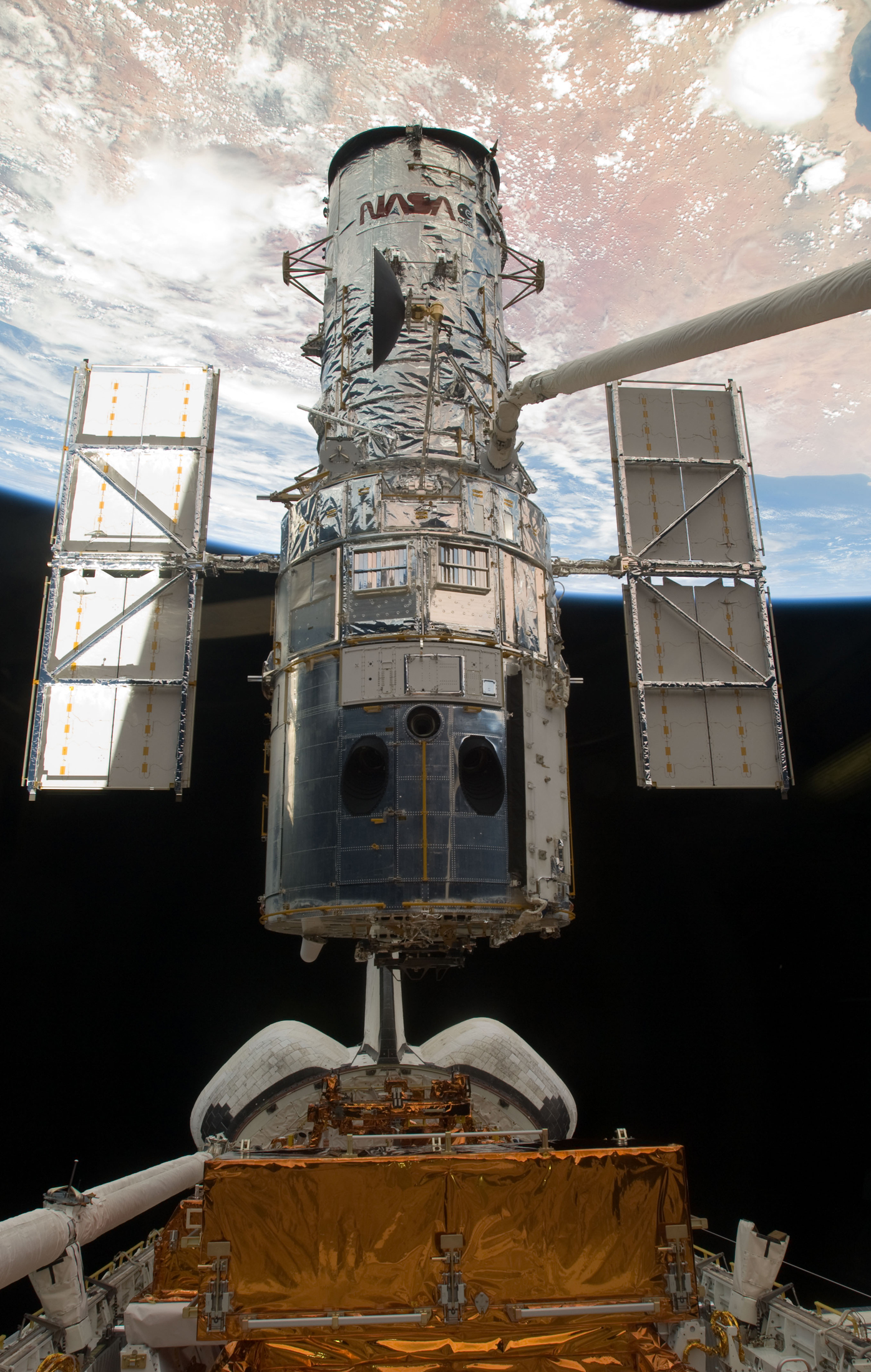
The Hubble Space Telescope being lifted out of the payload bay of Atlantis before being released back into space.

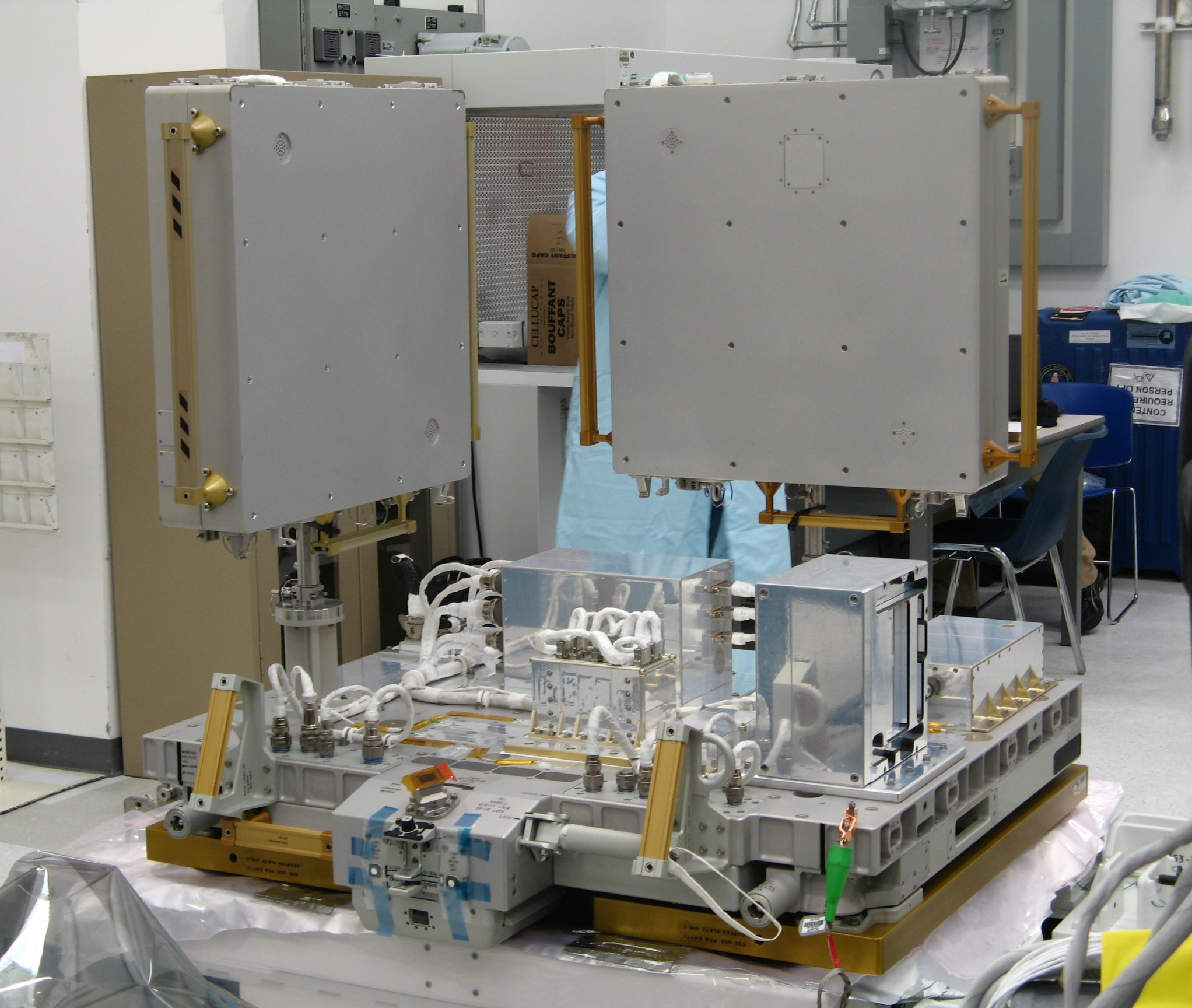
SpaceCube aboard MISSE-7

SpaceCube is a family of high-performance reconfigurable systems designed for spaceflight applications requiring on-board processing. The SpaceCube was developed by engineers at the NASA Goddard Space Flight Center. The SpaceCube 1.0 system is based on Xilinx's Virtex-4 commercial FPGAs. The debut mission of the SpaceCube 1.0, Hubble Servicing Mission 4, was the first time Xilinx's Virtex-4 FPGAs flew in space.

== Missions ==
- Hubble Servicing Mission 4: The SpaceCube was the brains of the Relative Navigation Sensors autonomous docking experiment that was intended to run in parallel with the astronaut controlled docking of the Hubble Space Telescope. RNS met its stated goals.
- MISSE-7: The SpaceCube was attached to the outside of the ISS during an EVA on Space Shuttle Mission STS-129 (Nov 2009). It provides an on-orbit test platform for demonstrating innovative radiation hardened by software techniques. It is mounted on the NRL's MISSE7 experiment which is attach to an ExPRESS Logistics Carrier.

== Family overview ==
- SpaceCube 1.0: Based on Xilinx's Virtex-4 commercial FPGAs.
- SpaceCube 1.5: Intermediate version of SpaceCube 2.0. Based on Xilinx's Virtex-5 commercial FPGAs. Scheduled to fly on sounding rocket flight in the fall of 2010.
- SpaceCube 2.0: Currently under development with over $1 million in funding. The SpaceCube 2.0 system is based around Xilinx's new radiation-hardened Virtex-5 FPGA.

== Awards ==
NASA's Goddard Space Flight Center SpaceCube team earned an honorable mention for the 2009 "IRAD Innovator of the Year" award.

== On-board science data processing achievements ==
- Synthetic Aperture Radar (SAR) results:
  - 6 to 1 loss-less data volume reduction on SAR Nadir Altimetry dataset.
  - 165x data volume reduction on SAR mapping dataset.
