= JAXA =

Japan's national air and space agency

Japan Aerospace Exploration Agency
- 宇宙航空研究開発機構; Uchū Kōkū Kenkyū Kaihatsu Kikō

Agency overview
- Abbreviation: JAXA (Note: ジャクサ)
- Formed: 1 October 2003; 23 years ago
- Preceding agencies: National Space Development Agency; Institute of Space and Astronautical Science; National Aerospace Laboratory of Japan
- Type: National Research and Development Agency
- Jurisdiction: Government of Japan
- Headquarters: Chōfu, Tokyo, Japan
- Motto: One JAXA
- Administrator: Hiroshi Yamakawa
- Primary spaceports: Tanegashima Space Center; Uchinoura Space Center
- Owner: Ministry of Education, Culture, Sports, Science and Technology
- Annual budget: ¥215.5 billion (JFY23)
- Website: global.jaxa.jp

The Japan Aerospace Exploration Agency (JAXA) (Note: Japanese: 国立研究開発法人宇宙航空研究開発機構, Hepburn: Kokuritsu-kenkyū-kaihatsu-hōjin Uchū Kōkū Kenkyū Kaihatsu Kikō; lit. 'National Research and Development Agency Aerospace Research and Development Organisation') is the operator of the Japanese space program and Japan's national aeronautics research agency. It was formed in 2003 through the merger of the Institute of Space and Astronautical Science, the National Aerospace Laboratory of Japan, and the National Space Development Agency of Japan.

JAXA has conducted missions including the SELENE lunar orbiter, the SLIM lunar lander and rovers, and the Hayabusa asteroid missions. Hayabusa returned samples from an asteroid in 2010, while Hayabusa2 deployed rovers on an asteroid surface. Akatsuki studied Venus from orbit between 2015 and 2024. IKAROS tested solar sail propulsion in interplanetary space. BepiColombo, launched jointly with the European Space Agency in 2018, is a mission to Mercury. Martian Moons eXploration was launched in October 2026 and is planned to return samples from Mars' moon, Phobos.

JAXA operates the H3, a medium-lift launch vehicle, from Tanegashima Space Center and the Epsilon S, a small-lift launch vehicle, from Uchinoura Space Center. JAXA is one of five space agencies participating in the International Space Station (ISS) program. It developed Kibō, the station's largest module, and since 2009 has regularly resupplied the ISS using the HTV and later HTV-X cargo spacecraft. Since 1992, eleven members of the JAXA Astronaut Corps have flown aboard the Space Shuttle, Soyuz, and Dragon 2 spacecraft, primarily on missions to the ISS.

== History ==
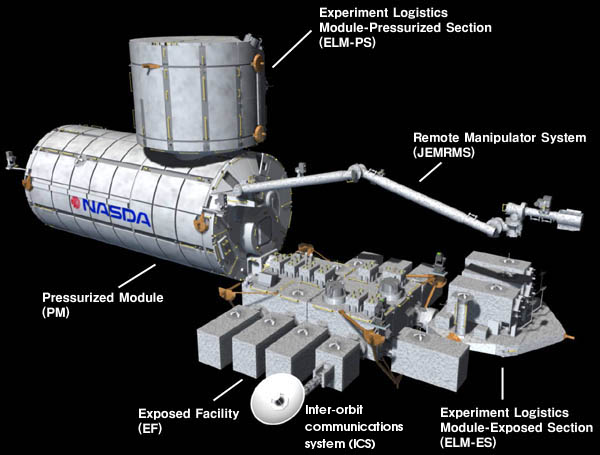
JAXA Kibo, the largest module of the ISS

On 1 October 2003, three organizations were merged to form the new JAXA: Japan's Institute of Space and Astronautical Science (ISAS), the National Aerospace Laboratory of Japan (NAL), and National Space Development Agency of Japan (NASDA). JAXA was formed as an Independent Administrative Institution administered by the Ministry of Education, Culture, Sports, Science and Technology (MEXT) and the Ministry of Internal Affairs and Communications (MIC).

Before the merger, ISAS was responsible for space and planetary research, while NAL was focused on aviation research. ISAS had been most successful in its space program in the field of X-ray astronomy during the 1980s and 1990s. Another successful area for Japan has been Very Long Baseline Interferometry (VLBI) with the HALCA mission. Additional success was achieved with solar observation and research of the magnetosphere, among other areas.

NASDA, which was founded on 1 October 1969, had developed rockets, satellites, and also built the Japanese Experiment Module. The old NASDA headquarters were located at the current site of the Tanegashima Space Center, on Tanegashima Island, 115 kilometers south of Kyūshū. NASDA was mostly active in the field of communication satellite technology. However, since the satellite market of Japan is completely open, the first time a Japanese company won a contract for a civilian communication satellite was in 2005. Another prime focus of the NASDA body is Earth climate observation. NASDA also trained the Japanese astronauts who flew with the US Space Shuttles.

The Basic Space Law was passed in 2008, and the jurisdictional authority of JAXA moved from MEXT to the Strategic Headquarters for Space Development (SHSD) in the Cabinet, led by the Prime Minister. In 2016, the National Space Policy Secretariat (NSPS) was set up by the Cabinet.

JAXA was awarded the Space Foundation's John L. "Jack" Swigert Jr., Award for Space Exploration in 2008.

Planning interplanetary research missions can take many years. Due to the lag time between these interplanetary events and mission planning time, opportunities to gain new knowledge about the cosmos might be lost. To prevent this, JAXA began commencing smaller and faster missions from 2010 onward.

In 2012, new legislation extended JAXA's remit from peaceful purposes only to include some military space development, such as missile early warning systems. Political control of JAXA passed from MEXT to the Prime Minister's Cabinet Office through a new Space Strategy Office.

In July 2026, JAXA and the National Space Agency of Singapore (NSAS) signed a memorandum of cooperation at SPACETIDE 2026 in Tokyo, the first bilateral space-agency agreement between Japan and Singapore. The agreement covers information exchange and cooperation in space technology and applications, space science and exploration, industry development, education, and policy and regulatory matters. The agencies also agreed to support business partnerships through JAXA's Co-funded Business Promotion Framework, under which Singapore became the third international partner after the United Kingdom and France.

=== Presidents ===
- Shūichirō Yamanouchi (2003–2004)
- Keiji Tachikawa (2004–2013)
- Naoki Okumura (2013–2018)
- Hiroshi Yamakawa (2018–present)

== Rockets ==
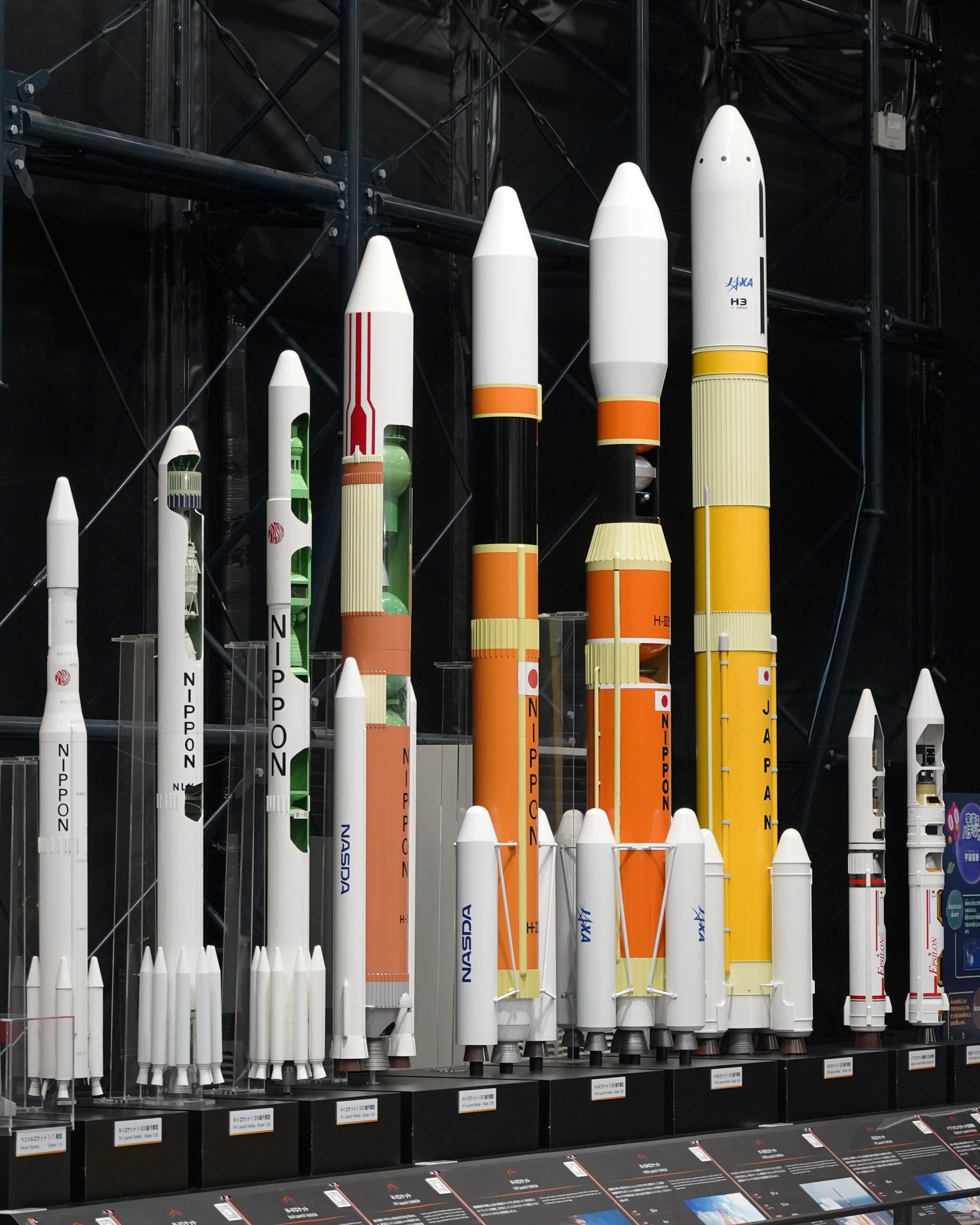
From left: N-I, N-II, H-I, H-II, H-IIA, H-IIB, H3, Epsilon, Enhanced Epsilon

As of 2026, JAXA operates the H3, a medium-lift launch vehicle, from Tanegashima Space Center and the Epsilon S, a small-lift launch vehicle, from Uchinoura. For experiments in the upper atmosphere JAXA uses the S-Series of sounding rockets.

Historically, Japan has also operated the H-I, H-II, H-IIA, H-IIB, J-I, N-I, N-II, and the Lambda and Mu rocket families.

=== Launch development ===
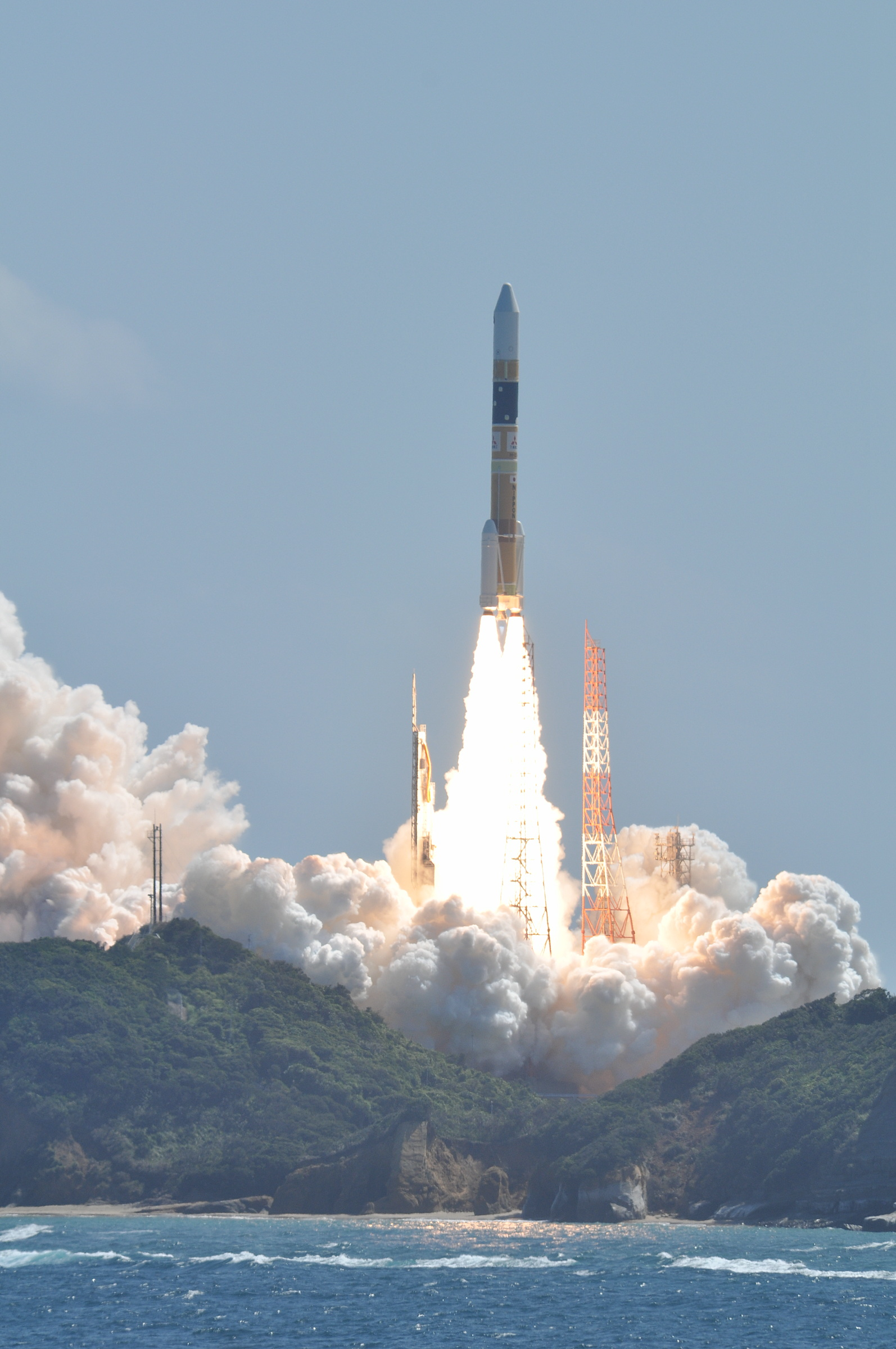
H-IIA F19 launch

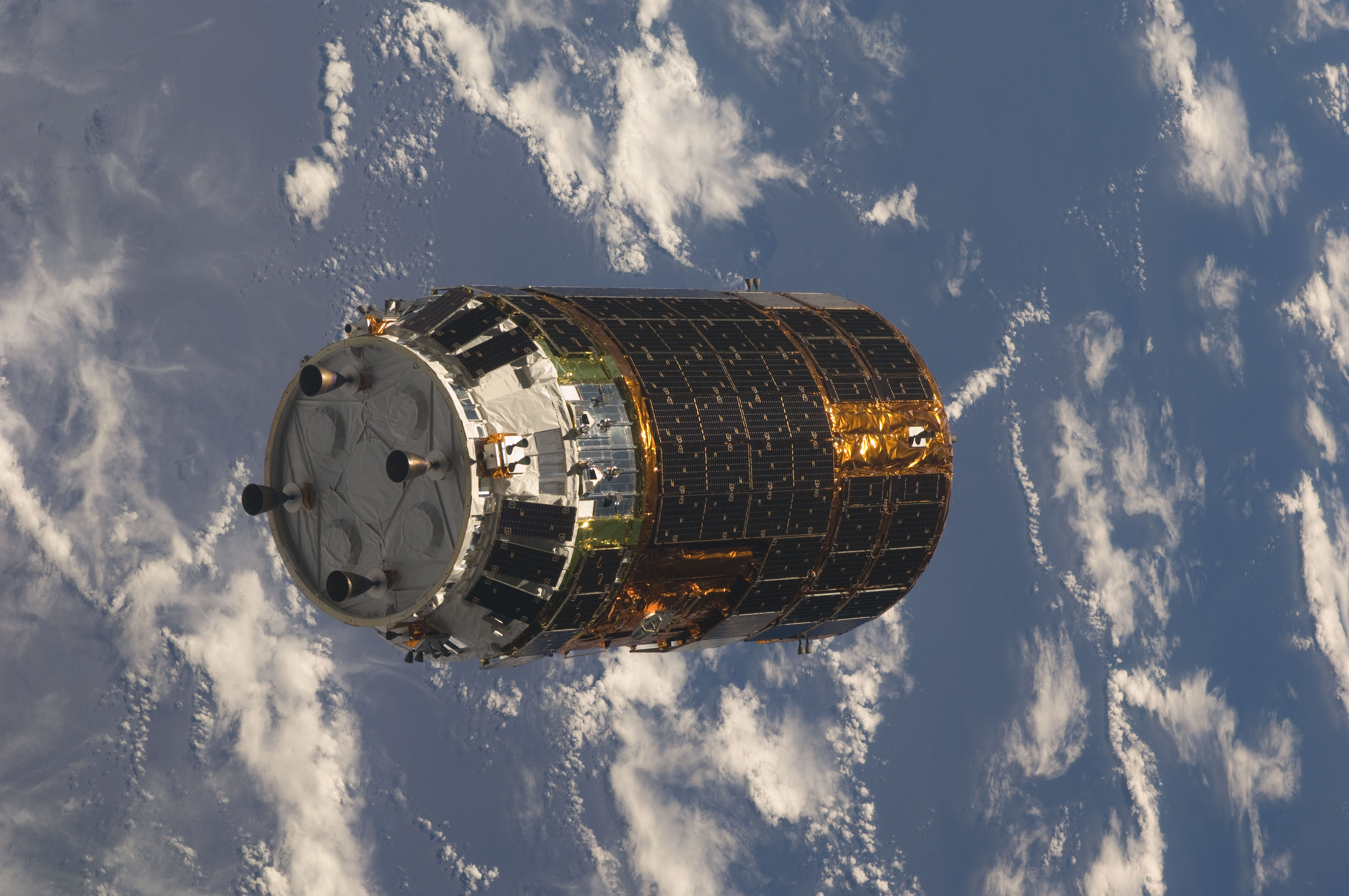
H-II Transfer Vehicle

Japan launched its first satellite, Ohsumi, in 1970, using ISAS' L-4S rocket. Prior to the merger, ISAS used small Mu rocket family of solid-fueled launch vehicles, while NASDA developed larger liquid-fueled launchers. In the beginning, NASDA used licensed American models.

The first model of liquid-fueled launch vehicle developed domestically in Japan was the H-II, introduced in 1994. NASDA developed the H-II with two goals in mind: to be able to launch satellites using only its own technology, such as the ISAS, and to dramatically improve its launch capability over previous licensed models. To achieve these two goals, a staged combustion cycle was adopted for the first stage engine, the LE-7. The combination of the liquid hydrogen two-stage combustion cycle first stage engine and solid rocket boosters was carried over to its successor, the H-IIA and H-IIB and became the basic configuration of Japan's liquid fuel launch vehicles for 30 years, from 1994 to 2024.

In 2003, JAXA was formed by merging Japan's three space agencies to streamline Japan's space program, and JAXA took over operations of the H-IIA liquid-fueled launch vehicle, the M-V solid-fuel launch vehicle, and several observation rockets from each agency. The H-IIA is a launch vehicle that improved reliability while reducing costs by making significant improvements to the H-II, and the M-V was the world's largest solid-fuel launch vehicle at the time.

In November 2003, JAXA's first launch after its inauguration, H-IIA No. 6, failed, but all other H-IIA launches were successful, and as of June 2025, the H-IIA had successfully launched 48 of its 49 launches. JAXA ended H-IIA operations by retiring it with H-IIA Flight No. 50, that was launched on 28 June 2025.

JAXA operated the H-IIB, an upgraded version of the H-IIA, from September 2009 to May 2020 and successfully launched the H-II Transfer Vehicle six times. This cargo spacecraft was responsible for resupplying the Kibo Japanese Experiment Module on the International Space Station.

To be able to launch smaller mission on JAXA developed a new solid-fueled rocket, the Epsilon as a replacement to the retired M-V. The maiden flight successfully happened in 2013. So far, the rocket has flown six times with one launch failure.

In January 2017, JAXA attempted and failed to put a miniature satellite into orbit atop one of its SS520 series rockets. A second attempt on 2 February 2018 was successful, putting a four kilogram CubeSat into Earth orbit. The rocket, known as the SS-520-5, is the world's smallest orbital launcher.

In 2023, JAXA began operating the H3, which will replace the H-IIA and H-IIIB; the H3 is a liquid-fueled launch vehicle developed from a completely new design like the H-II, rather than an improved development like the H-IIA and H-IIB, which were based on the H-II. The design goal of the H3 is to increase launch capability at a lower cost than the H-IIA and H-IIB. To achieve this, an expander bleed cycle was used for the first time in the world for the first stage of the engine.

=== Reusable launch vehicles ===
Until 2003, JAXA (ISAS) conducted research on a reusable launch vehicle under the Reusable Vehicle Testing (RVT) project.

== Lunar and interplanetary missions ==
Japan's first missions beyond Earth orbit were the 1985 Halley's Comet observation spacecraft Sakigake (MS-T5) and Suisei (PLANET-A). To prepare for future missions, ISAS tested Earth swing by orbits with the Hiten lunar mission in 1990. The first Japanese interplanetary mission was the Mars Orbiter Nozomi (PLANET-B), which was launched in 1998. It passed Mars in 2003, but failed to reach Mars orbit due to maneuvering systems failures earlier in the mission. Currently interplanetary missions remain at the ISAS group under the JAXA umbrella. However, for FY 2008 JAXA is planning to set up an independent working group within the organization. New head for this group will be Hayabusa project manager Kawaguchi.

- Active missions: PLANET-C, IKAROS, Hayabusa2, BepiColombo, MMX
- Under development: DESTINY^{+}
- Past missions: PLANET-B, SELENE, MUSES-C, SLIM, LEV-1, LEV-2

=== Small body exploration: Hayabusa mission ===
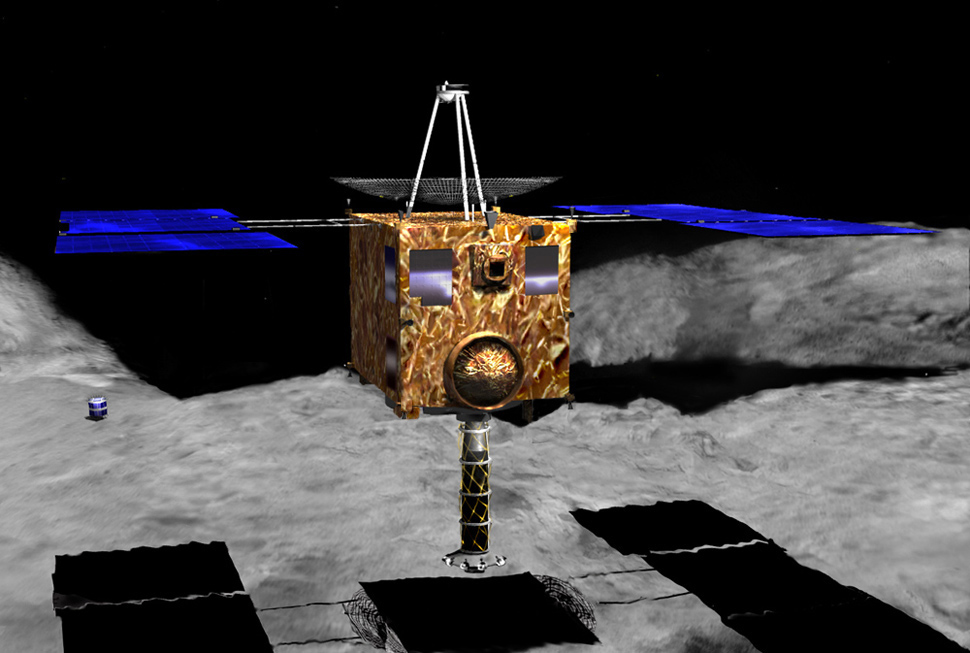
Hayabusa

On 9 May 2003, Hayabusa (meaning Peregrine falcon), was launched from an M-V rocket. The goal of the mission was to collect samples from a small near-Earth asteroid named 25143 Itokawa. The craft rendezvoused with the asteroid in September 2005. It was confirmed that the spacecraft successfully landed on the asteroid in November 2005, after some initial confusion regarding the incoming data. Hayabusa returned to Earth with samples from the asteroid on 13 June 2010.

Hayabusa was the world's first spacecraft to return asteroid samples to Earth and the world's first spacecraft to make a round trip to a celestial body farther from Earth than the Moon.

Hayabusa2 was launched in 2014 and returned samples from asteroid 162173 Ryugu to Earth in 2020.

=== Lunar exploration ===
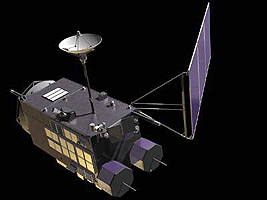
Kaguya

After Hiten in 1990, JAXA planned a lunar penetrator mission called LUNAR-A but after delays due to technical problems, the project was terminated in January 2007. The seismometer penetrator design for LUNAR-A may be reused in a future mission.

On 14 September 2007, JAXA succeeded in launching the lunar orbit explorer Kaguya, also known as SELENE, on an H-2A rocket (costing 55 billion yen including launch vehicle), the largest such mission since the Apollo program. Its mission was to gather data on the Moon's origin and evolution. It entered lunar orbit on 4 October 2007. After 1 year and 8 months, it impacted the lunar surface on 10 June 2009 at 18:25 UTC.

JAXA launched its first lunar surface mission SLIM (Smart Lander for Investigating Moon) in 2023. It successfully soft landed on 19 January 2024 at 15:20 UTC, making Japan the 5th country to do so. The main goal of SLIM was to improve the accuracy of spacecraft landing on the Moon and to land a spacecraft within 100 meters of its target, which no spacecraft had achieved before. SLIM landed 55 meters from the target landing site, and JAXA announced that it was the world's first successful "pinpoint landing. Although it landed successfully, it landed with the solar panels oriented westwards, facing away from the Sun at the start of lunar day, thereby failing to generate enough power. The lander operated on internal battery power, which was fully drained that day. The mission's operators hope that the lander will wake up after a few days when sunlight should hit the solar panels.

Two rovers, LEV 1 and 2, deployed during hovering just before final landing are working as expected with LEV-1 communicating independently to the ground stations. LEV-1 conducted seven hops over 107 minutes on the lunar surface. Images taken by LEV-2 show that it landed in the wrong attitude with loss of an engine nozzle during descent and even possible sustained damage to lander's Earth bound antenna which is not pointed towards Earth. The mission was considered fully successful after confirmation that its primary goal, landing within 100 m (330 ft) of the target was achieved, despite subsequent issues.

On 29 January, the lander resumed operations after being shut down for a week. JAXA said it re-established contact with the lander and its solar cells were working again after a shift in lighting conditions allowed it to catch sunlight. After that, SLIM was put into sleep mode due to the approaching harsh lunar night where temperatures reach −120 °C (−184 °F). SLIM was expected to operate only for one lunar daylight period, which lasts for 14 Earth days, and the on-board electronics were not designed to withstand the nighttime temperatures on the Moon. On 25 February 2024, JAXA sent wake-up calls and found SLIM had successfully survived the night on the lunar surface while maintaining communication capabilities. At that time it was solar noon on the Moon so the temperature of the communications equipment was extremely high, so communication was terminated after only a short period of time. JAXA is now preparing for resumed operations, once the temperature has fallen sufficiently. The feat of surviving lunar night without a Radioisotope heater unit had only been achieved by some landers in Surveyor Program.

=== Planetary exploration ===
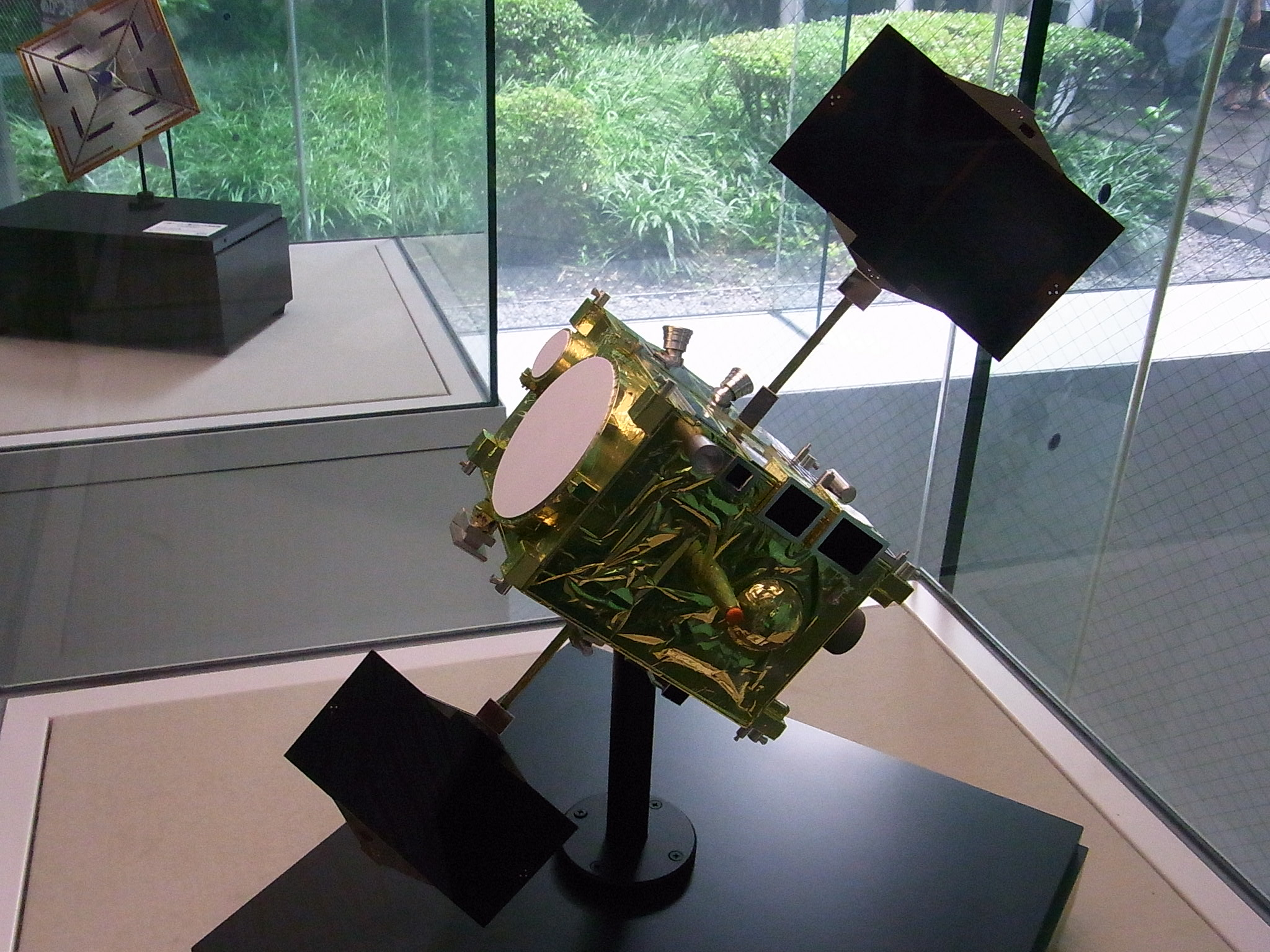
Akatsuki

Japan's planetary missions have so far been limited to the inner Solar System, and emphasis has been put on magnetospheric and atmospheric research. The Mars explorer Nozomi (PLANET-B), which ISAS launched prior to the merger of the three aerospace institutes, became one of the earliest difficulties the newly formed JAXA faced. Nozomi ultimately passed 1,000 km from the surface of Mars. On 20 May 2010, the Venus Climate Orbiter Akatsuki (PLANET-C) and IKAROS solar sail demonstrator was launched by a H-2A launch vehicle.

On 7 December 2010, Akatsuki was unable to complete its Venus orbit insertion maneuver. Akatsuki finally entered Venus orbit on 7 December 2015, making it the first Japanese spacecraft to orbit another planet, sixteen years after the originally planned orbital insertion of Nozomi. One of Akatsuki's main goal is to uncover the mechanism behind Venus atmosphere's super-rotation, a phenomenon in which the cloud top winds in the troposphere circulates around the planet faster than the speed that Venus itself rotates. A thorough explanation for this phenomenon has yet been found.

JAXA/ISAS was part of the international Laplace Jupiter mission proposal from its foundation. A Japanese contribution was sought in the form of an independent orbiter to research Jupiter's magnetosphere, JMO (Jupiter Magnetospheric Orbiter). Although JMO never left the conception phase, ISAS scientists will see their instruments reaching Jupiter on the ESA-led JUICE (Jupiter Icy Moon Explorer) mission. JUICE is a reformulation of the ESA Ganymede orbiter from the Laplace project. JAXA's contribution includes providing components of the RPWI (Radio & Plasma Wave Investigation), PEP (Particle Environment Package), GALA (GAnymede Laser Altimeter) instruments.

JAXA has launched a new spacecraft mission to the Martian system; a sample return mission to Phobos called MMX (Martian Moons Explorer). First revealed on 9 June 2015, MMX's primary goal is to determine the origin of the Martian moons. Alongside collecting samples from Phobos, MMX will perform remote sensing of Deimos, and may also observe the atmosphere of Mars as well. MMX was launched on 20 October 2026.

=== Solar sail research ===
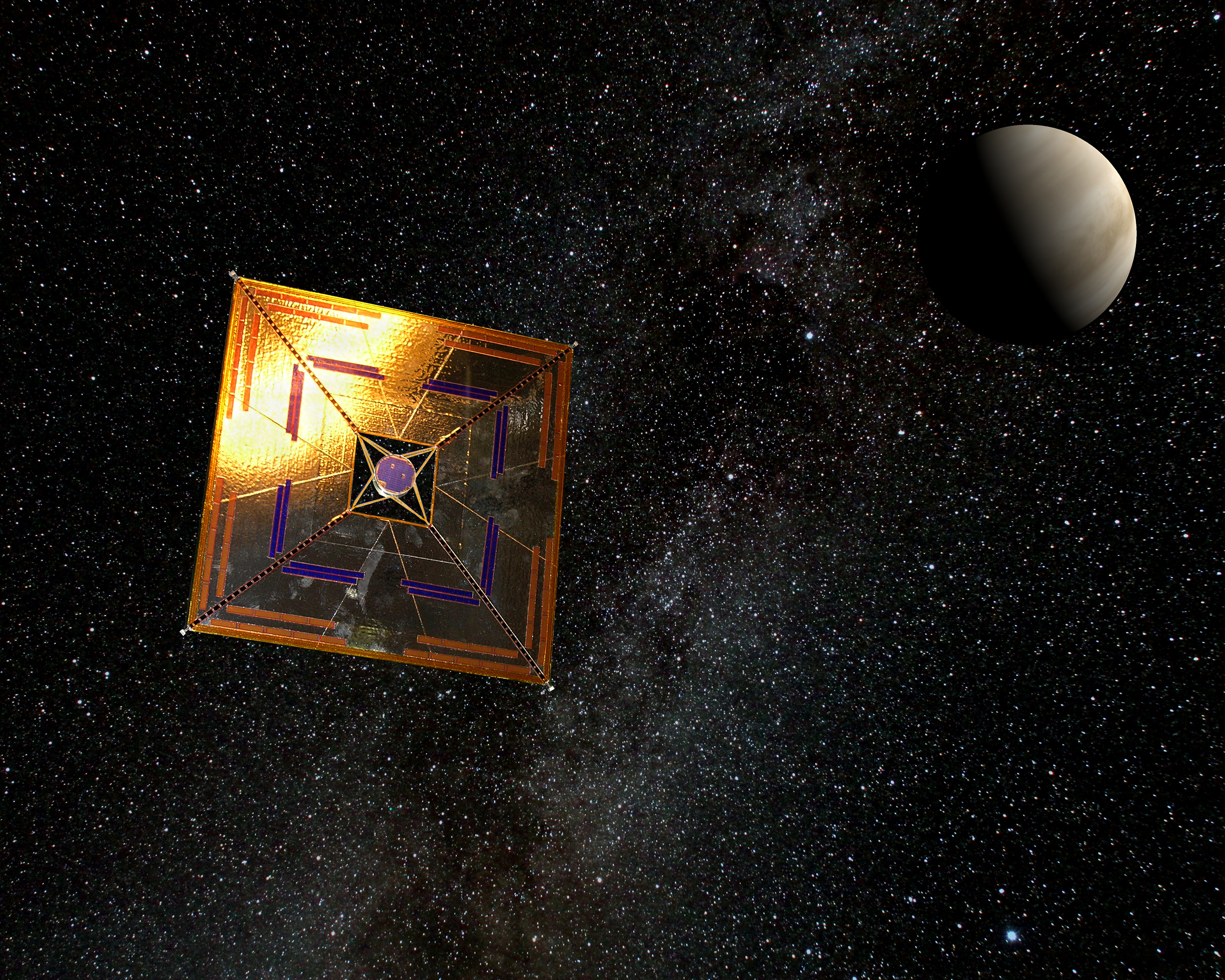
IKAROS

On 9 August 2004, ISAS successfully deployed two prototype solar sails from a sounding rocket. A clover-type sail was deployed at 122 km altitude and a fan type sail was deployed at 169 km altitude. Both sails used 7.5 micrometer-thick film.

ISAS tested a solar sail again as a sub-payload to the Akari (ASTRO-F) mission on 22 February 2006. However the solar sail did not deploy fully. ISAS tested a solar sail again as a sub payload of the SOLAR-B launch on 23 September 2006, but contact with the probe was lost.

The IKAROS solar sail was launched in May 2010 and successfully demonstrated solar sail technology in July. This made IKAROS the world's first spacecraft to successfully demonstrate solar sail technology in interplanetary space. The goal is to have a solar sail mission to Jupiter after 2020.

== Astronomy program ==
The first Japanese astronomy mission was the X-ray satellite Hakucho (CORSA-b), which was launched in 1979. Later ISAS moved into solar observation, radio astronomy through space VLBI and infrared astronomy.

Active Missions: SOLAR-B, MAXI, SPRINT-A, CALET, XRISM
Under Development:
Retired: HALCA, ASTRO-F, ASTRO-EII, and ASTRO-H
Cancelled(C)/Failed(F): ASTRO-E (F), ASTRO-G (C),

=== Infrared astronomy ===
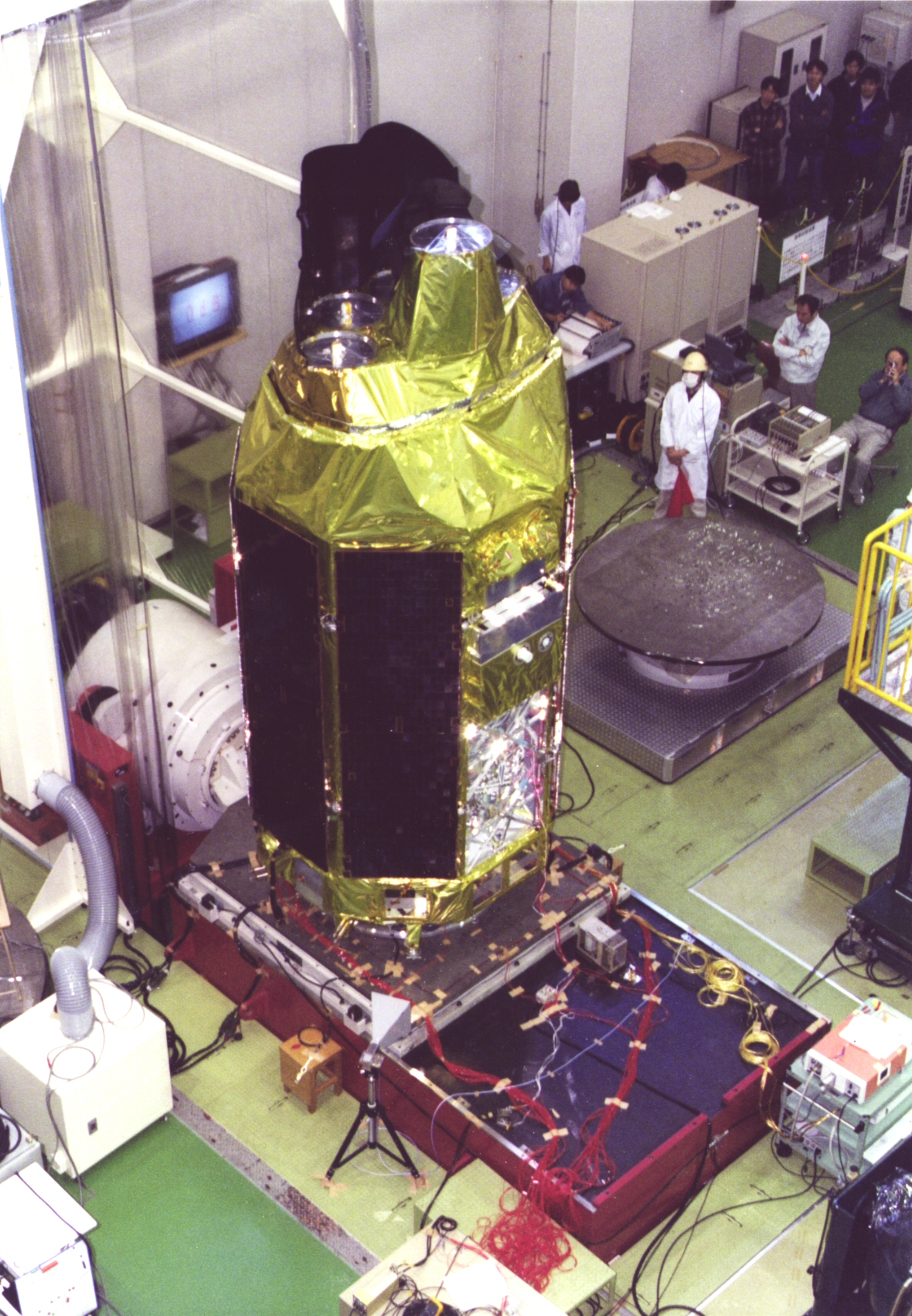
ASTRO-E

Japan's infrared astronomy began with the 15-cm IRTS telescope which was part of the SFU multipurpose satellite in 1995. ISAS also gave ground support for the ESA Infrared Space Observatory (ISO) infrared mission.

JAXA's first infrared astronomy satellite was the Akari spacecraft, with the pre-launch designation ASTRO-F. This satellite was launched on 21 February 2006. Its mission is infrared astronomy with a 68 cm telescope. This is the first all sky survey since the first infrared mission IRAS in 1983. (A 3.6 kg nanosatellite named CUTE-1.7 was also released from the same launch vehicle.)

JAXA is also doing further R&D for increasing the performance of its mechanical coolers for its future infrared mission, SPICA. This would enable a warm launch without liquid helium. SPICA has the same size as the ESA Herschel Space Observatory mission, but is planned to have a temperature of just 4.5 K and will be much colder. Unlike Akari, which had a geocentric orbit, SPICA will be located at Sun–Earth L_{2}. The launch is expected in 2027 or 2028 on JAXA's new H3 Launch Vehicle, however the mission is not yet fully funded. ESA and NASA may also each contribute an instrument. The SPICA mission was cancelled in 2020.

=== X-ray astronomy ===
Starting from 1979 with Hakucho (CORSA-b), for nearly two decades Japan had achieved continuous observation. However, in the year 2000 the launch of ISAS's X-ray observation satellite, ASTRO-E failed (as it failed at launch it never received a proper name).

Then on 10 July 2005, JAXA was finally able to launch a new X-ray astronomy mission named Suzaku (ASTRO-EII). This launch was important for JAXA, because in the five years since the launch failure of the original ASTRO-E satellite, Japan was without an x-ray telescope. Three instruments were included in this satellite: an X-ray spectrometer (XRS), an X-ray imaging spectrometer (XIS), and a hard X-ray detector (HXD). However, the XRS was rendered inoperable due to a malfunction which caused the satellite to lose its supply of liquid helium.

The next JAXA x-ray mission is the Monitor of All-sky X-ray Image (MAXI). MAXI continuously monitors astronomical X-ray objects over a broad energy band (0.5 to 30 keV). MAXI is installed on the Japanese external module of the ISS. On 17 February 2016, Hitomi (ASTRO-H) was launched as the successor to Suzaku, which completed its mission a year before.

=== Solar observation ===
Japan's solar astronomy started in the early 1980s with the launch of the Hinotori (ASTRO-A) X-ray mission. The Hinode (SOLAR-B) spacecraft, the follow-on to the joint Japan/US/UK Yohkoh (SOLAR-A) spacecraft, was launched on 23 September 2006 by JAXA. A SOLAR-C can be expected sometime after 2020. However no details are worked out yet other than it will not be launched with the former ISAS's Mu rockets. Instead a H-2A from Tanegashima could launch it. As H-2A is more powerful, SOLAR-C could either be heavier or be stationed at L_{1} (Lagrange point 1).

=== Radio astronomy ===
In 1997, Japan launched the HALCA (MUSES-B) mission, the world's first spacecraft dedicated to conduct space VLBI observations of pulsars, among others. To do so, ISAS set up a ground network around the world through international cooperation. The observation part of the mission lasted until 2003 and the satellite was retired at the end of 2005. In FY 2006, Japan funded the ASTRO-G as the succeeding mission. ASTRO-G was canceled in 2011.

== Communication, positioning and technology tests ==
One of the primary duties of the former NASDA body was the testing of new space technologies, mostly in the field of communication. The first test satellite was ETS-I, launched in 1975. However, during the 1990s, NASDA was afflicted by problems surrounding the ETS-VI and COMETS missions.

In February 2018, JAXA announced a research collaboration with Sony to test a laser communication system from the Kibo module in late 2018.

In January 2025, it was reported that JAXA is collaborating with Japan Airlines and O-Well Corporation to test a riblet-shaped coating on the airline's Boeing 787-9 Dreamliner that would reduce aerodynamic drag and improve fuel efficiency. The coating is capable of reducing drag by 0.24%, leading to the savings of 119 tons of fuel and 381 tons of CO_{2} emissions per plane per annum.

Testing of communication technologies remains to be one of JAXA's key duties in cooperation with NICT.

Active Missions: INDEX, QZS-1, SLATS, QZS-2, QZS-3, QZS-4, QZS-1R
Under Development: ETS-IX
Retired: OICETS, ETS-VIII, WINDS

=== i-Space : ETS-VIII, WINDS and QZS-1 ===
To upgrade Japan's communication technology the Japanese state launched the i-Space initiative with the ETS-VIII and WINDS missions.

ETS-VIII was launched on 18 December 2006. The purpose of ETS-VIII is to test communication equipment with two very large antennas and an atomic clock test. On 26 December both antennas were successfully deployed. This was not unexpected, since JAXA tested the deployment mechanism before with the LDREX-2 Mission, which was launched on 14 October with the European Ariane 5. The test was successful.

On 23 February 2008, JAXA launched the Wideband InterNetworking engineering test and Demonstration Satellite (WINDS), also called "KIZUNA". WINDS aimed to facilitate experiments with faster satellite Internet connections. The launch, using H-IIA launch vehicle 14, took place from Tanegashima Space Center. WINDS was decommissioned on 27 February 2019.

On 11 September 2010, JAXA launched QZS-1 (Michibiki-1), the first satellite of the Quasi Zenith Satellite System (QZSS), a subsystem of the global positioning system (GPS). Three more followed in 2017, and a replacement for QZS-1 is scheduled to launch in late 2021. A next-generation set of three satellites, able to operate independent of GPS, is scheduled to begin launching in 2023.

=== OICETS and INDEX ===
On 24 August 2005, JAXA launched the experimental satellites OICETS and INDEX on a Ukrainian Dnepr rocket. OICETS (Kirari) is a mission tasked with testing optical links with the European Space Agency (ESA) ARTEMIS satellite, which is around 40,000 km away from OICETS. The experiment was successful on 9 December, when the link could be established. In March 2006, JAXA could establish with OICETS the worldwide first optical links between a LEO satellite and a ground station first in Japan and in June 2006 with a mobile station in Germany.

INDEX (Reimei) is a small 70 kg satellite for testing various equipment, and functions as an aurora observation mission as well. The Reimei satellite is currently in its extended mission phase.

== Earth observation program ==
Japan's first Earth observation satellites were MOS-1a and MOS-1b launched in 1987 and 1990. During the 1990s, and the new millennium this NASDA program came under heavy fire, because both Adeos (Midori) and Adeos 2 (Midori 2) satellites failed after just ten months in orbit.

Active Missions: GOSAT, GCOM-W, ALOS-2, GCOM-C, GOSAT-2
Retired/Failed (R/F): ALOS (R), ALOS-3 (F)

=== ALOS ===
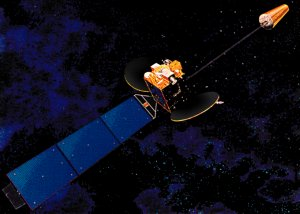
MTSAT-1

In January 2006, JAXA successfully launched the Advanced Land Observation Satellite (ALOS/Daichi). Communication between ALOS and the ground station in Japan will be done through the Kodama Data Relay Satellite, which was launched during 2002. This project is under intense pressure due to the shorter than expected lifetime of the ADEOS II (Midori) Earth Observation Mission. For missions following Daichi, JAXA opted to separate it into a radar satellite (ALOS-2) and an optical satellite, (ALOS-3). ALOS 2 SAR (Synthetic Aperture Radar) satellite was launched in May 2014. The ALOS-3 satellite was aboard a H3 rocket in March 2023, but the satellite was lost in a launch failure when the second stage failed to ignite. ALOS-4, 2's SAR successor, was launched successfully in July 2024. A true successor to ALOS-3 is planned to launch around 2027.

=== Rainfall observation ===
Since Japan is an island nation and gets struck by typhoons every year, research about the dynamics of the atmosphere is a very important issue. For this reason Japan launched in 1997 the TRMM (Tropical Rainfall Measuring Mission) satellite in cooperation with NASA, to observe the tropical rainfall seasons. For further research NASDA had launched the ADEOS and ADEOS II missions in 1996 and 2003. However, due to various reasons, both satellites had a much shorter than expected life term.

On 28 February 2014, a H-2A rocket launched the GPM Core Observatory, a satellite jointly developed by JAXA and NASA. The GPM mission is the successor to the TRMM mission, which by the time of the GPM launch had been noted as highly successful. JAXA provided the Global Precipitation Measurement/Dual-frequency Precipitation Radar (GPM/DPR) Instrument for this mission. Global Precipitation Measurement itself is a satellite constellation, whilst the GPM Core Observatory provides a new calibration standard for other satellites in the constellation. Other countries/agencies like France, India, ESA, etc. provides the sub-satellites. The aim of GPM is to measure global rainfall with unprecedented detail.

=== Monitoring of carbon dioxide ===
At the end of the 2008 fiscal year, JAXA launched the satellite GOSAT (Greenhouse Gas Observing SATellite) to help scientists determine and monitor the density distribution of carbon dioxide in the atmosphere. The satellite is being jointly developed by JAXA and Japan's Ministry of the Environment. JAXA is building the satellite while the Ministry is in charge of the data that will be collected. Since the number of ground-based carbon dioxide observatories cannot monitor enough of the world's atmosphere and are distributed unevenly throughout the globe, the GOSAT may be able to gather more accurate data and fill in the gaps on the globe where there are no observatories on the ground. Sensors for methane and other greenhouse gasses are also being considered for the satellite, although the plans are not yet finalized. The satellite weighs approximately 1650 kg and is expected to have a life span of five years.

The successor satellite GOSAT 2 was launched in October 2018. The successor satellite to GOSAT-2, GOSAT-GW, was launched in June 2025.

=== GCOM series ===
The next funded Earth-observation mission after GOSAT is the GCOM (Global Change Observation Mission) Earth-observation program as a successor to ADEOS II (Midori) and the Aqua mission. To reduce the risk and for a longer observation time the mission will be split into smaller satellites. Altogether GCOM will be a series of six satellites. The first satellite, GCOM-W (Shizuku), was launched on 17 May 2012 with the H-IIA. The second satellite, GCOM-C (Shikisai), was launched in 2017.

== Satellites for other agencies ==
For weather observation Japan launched in February 2005 the Multi-Functional Transport Satellite 1R (MTSAT-1R). The success of this launch was critical for Japan, since the original MTSAT-1 could not be put into orbit because of a launch failure with the H-2 rocket in 1999. Since then Japan relied for weather forecasting on an old satellite which was already beyond its useful life term and on American systems.

On 18 February 2006, JAXA, as head of the H-IIA at this time, successfully launched the MTSAT-2 aboard a H-2A rocket. MTSAT-2 is the backup to the MTSAT-1R. The MTSAT-2 uses the DS2000 satellite bus developed by Mitsubishi Electric. The DS2000 is also used for the DRTS Kodama, ETS-VIII and the Superbird 7 communication satellite, making it the first commercial success for Japan.

As a secondary mission both the MTSAT-1R and MTSAT-2 help to direct air traffic.

== Other JAXA satellites currently in use ==
- GEOTAIL magnetosphere observation satellite (since 1992)

Ongoing joint missions with NASA are the Aqua Earth Observation Satellite, and the Global Precipitation Measurement (GPM) Core satellite. JAXA also provided the Light Particle Telescope (LPT) for the 2008 Jason 2 satellite by the French CNES.

On 11 May 2018, JAXA deployed the first satellite developed in Kenya from the Japanese Experiment Module of the International Space Station. The satellite, 1KUNS-PF, was created by the University of Nairobi.

== Completed missions ==
=== Decommissioned missions ===
- Tropical Rainfall Measuring Mission (TRMM) joint NASA-JAXA weather satellite, 1997–2015 (decommissioned)
- Akebono Magnetosphere observation satellite, 1989–2015 (decommissioned)
- Suzaku X-ray astronomy satellite, 2005–2015 (decommissioned)
- ALOS Earth observation satellite, 2006–2011 (decommissioned)
- Akari, Infrared astronomy satellite, 2006–2011 (decommissioned)
- Hayabusa Asteroid sample return mission, 2003–2010 (decommissioned)
- OICETS, Technology demonstration, 2005–2009 (decommissioned)
- SELENE, Lunar orbiter, 2007–2009 (decommissioned)
- Micro Lab Sat 1, Small engineering mission, 2002 (decommissioned)
- HALCA, Space VLBI 1997–2005 (decommissioned)
- MDS-1, Technology Demonstration 2002–2003 (decommissioned)
- DRTS (Kodama) relay satellite, 2002–2017 (decommissioned)

=== Failed missions ===
- ASTRO-H X-ray astronomy satellite, 2016
- Nozomi, Mars Mission 1998–2003
- ADEOS 2 (Midori 2) Earth Observation 2002–2003

== Future missions ==
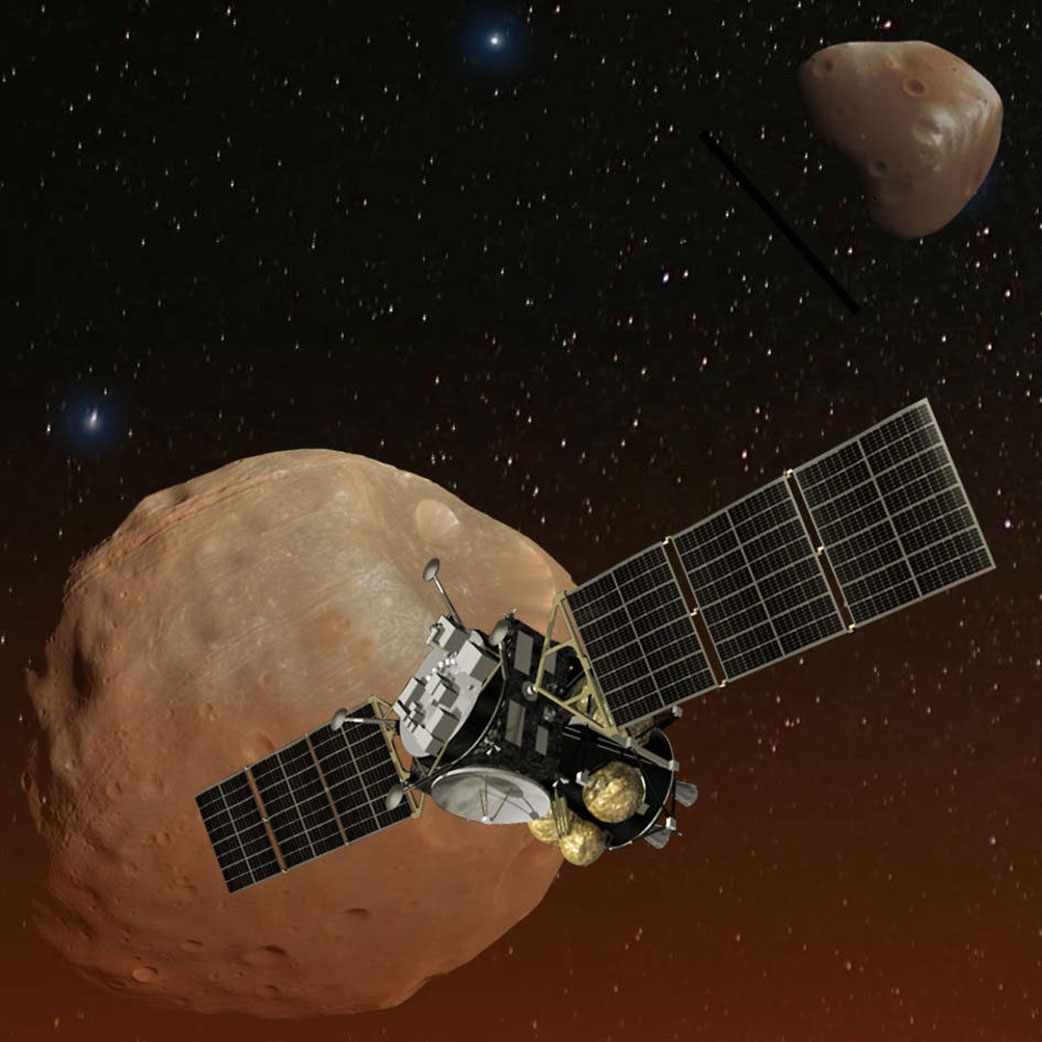
Artist's concept of Japan's Martian Moons eXploration (MMX) spacecraft, launched in October 2026

=== Launch schedule ===
==== FY 2025 ====
- ETS-IX
- HTV-X1
- Innovative Satellite Technology Demonstration-4
- QZS-6
- QZS-7

==== FY 2026 ====
- HTV-X2
- HTV-X3
- MMX: Remote sensing of Deimos, sample return from Phobos

==== FY 2027 ====
- Innovative Satellite Technology Demonstration-5

==== FY 2028 ====
- DESTINY^{+}: Small-scale technology demonstrator which will also conduct scientific observations of asteroid 3200 Phaethon
- JASMINE: an astrometric telescope similar to the Gaia mission but operating in the infrared (2.2 μm) and specifically targeting the Galactic plane and center, where Gaia's results are impaired by dust absorption.
- LUPEX: joint lunar lander and rover with ISRO
- Solar-C

==== FY 2029 ====
- Comet Interceptor (ESA led mission, Japan provides one of the secondary spacecraft)
- Innovative Satellite Technology Demonstration-6

==== FY 2031 ====
- Innovative Satellite Technology Demonstration-7

==== FY 2032 ====
- LiteBIRD: a mission to study CMB B-mode polarization and cosmic inflation based at the Sun–Earth L_{2} Lagrangian point

==== Other missions ====
For the 2023 EarthCARE mission with ESA, JAXA will provide the radar system on the satellite. JAXA will provide the Auroral Electron Sensor (AES) for the Taiwanese FORMOSAT-5.

- XEUS: joint X-Ray telescope with ESA, originally planned for launch after 2015. Cancelled and replaced by ATHENA.

=== Proposals ===
- Human Lunar Systems, conceptual system study on the future human lunar outpost
- OKEANOS, a mission to Jupiter and Trojan asteroids utilizing "hybrid propulsion" of solar sail and ion engines
- SPICA, a 2.5 meter infrared telescope to be placed at L2
- FORCE, small-scale hard x-ray observation with high sensitivity
- DIOS, small-scale x-ray observation mission to survey warm–hot intergalactic medium
- APPROACH, small-scale lunar penetrator mission
- HiZ-GUNDAM, small-scale gamma ray burst observation mission
- B-DECIGO, gravity wave observation test mission
- Hayabusa Mk2/Marco Polo
- Space Solar Power System (SSPS), space-based solar power prototype launch in 2020, aiming for a full-power system in 2030

== Human spaceflight program ==
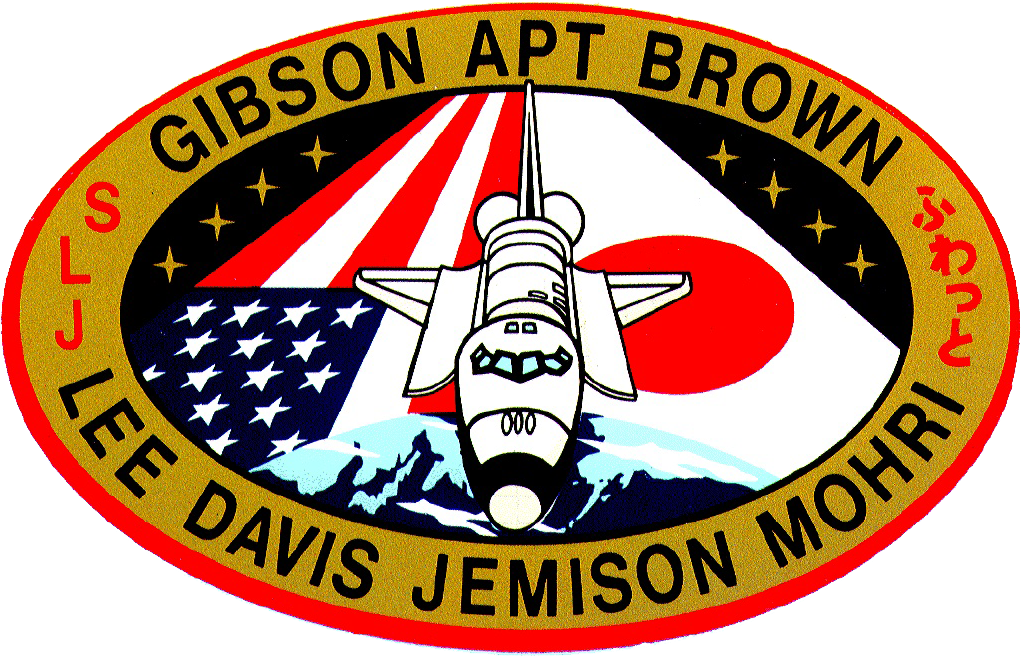
The Spacelab-J shuttle flight, funded by Japan, included several tons of Japanese science research equipment.

Japan has ten astronauts but has not yet developed its own crewed spacecraft and is not currently developing one officially. A potentially crewed spaceplane HOPE-X project launched by the conventional space launcher H-II was developed for several years (including test flights of HYFLEX/OREX prototypes) but was postponed. The simpler crewed capsule Fuji was proposed but not adopted. Projects for single-stage-to-orbit, horizontal takeoff reusable launch vehicle and landing ASSTS and the vertical takeoff and landing Kankoh-maru also exist but have not been adopted.

The first Japanese citizen to fly in space was Toyohiro Akiyama, a journalist sponsored by TBS, who flew on the Soviet Soyuz TM-11 in December 1990. He spent more than seven days in space on the Mir space station, in what the Soviets called their first commercial spaceflight which allowed them to earn $14 million.

Japan participates in US and international crewed space programs including flights of Japanese astronauts on Russian Soyuz spacecraft to the ISS. One Space Shuttle mission (STS-47) in September 1992 was partially funded by Japan. This flight included JAXA's first astronaut in space, Mamoru Mohri, as the Payload Specialist for the Spacelab-J, one of the European built Spacelab modules. This mission was also designated Japan.

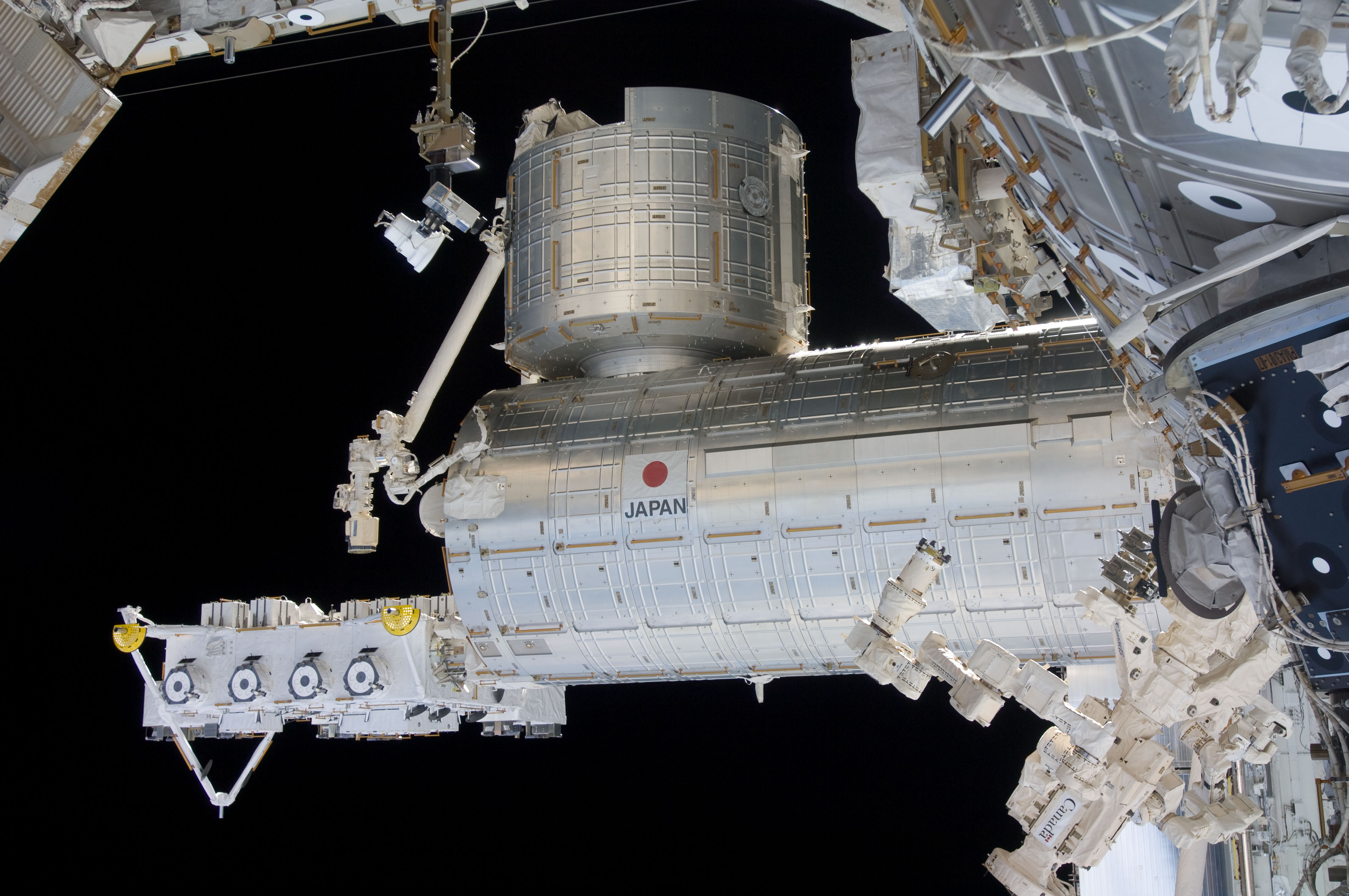
A view of the completed Kibō module of the ISS

Three other NASA Space Shuttle missions (STS-123, STS-124, STS-127) in 2008–2009 delivered parts of the Japanese built spacelab-module Kibō to ISS.

Japanese plans for a crewed lunar landing were in development but were shelved in early 2010 due to budget constraints.

In June 2014, Japan's science and technology ministry said it was considering a space mission to Mars. In a ministry paper it indicated uncrewed exploration, crewed missions to Mars and long-term settlement on the Moon were objectives, for which international cooperation and support was going to be sought.

On 18 October 2017, JAXA discovered a "tunnel"-like lava tube under the surface of the Moon . The tunnel appears to be suitable as a location for a base of operations for peaceful crewed space missions, according to JAXA.

== Supersonic aircraft development ==
Besides the H-IIA/B and Epsilon rockets, JAXA is also developing technology for a next-generation supersonic transport that could become the commercial replacement for the Concorde. The design goal of the project (working name Next Generation Supersonic Transport) is to develop a jet that can carry 300 passengers at Mach 2. A subscale model of the jet underwent aerodynamic testing in September and October 2005 in Australia.

In 2015, JAXA performed tests aimed at reducing the effects of supersonic flight under the D-SEND program. The economic success of such a project is still unclear, and as a consequence the project has been met with limited interest from Japanese aerospace companies like Mitsubishi Heavy Industries so far.

== Organization ==
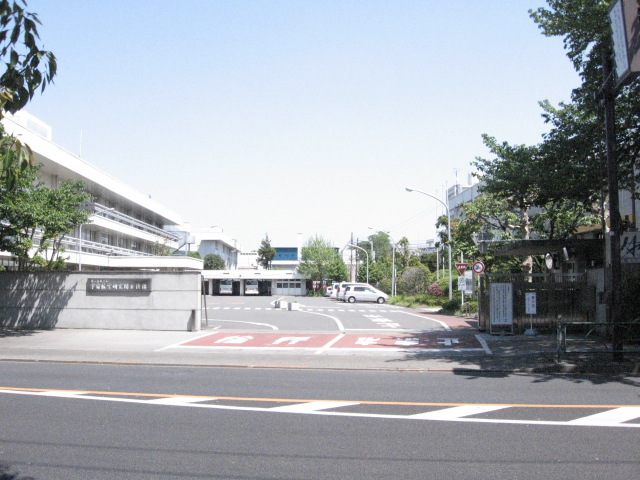
JAXA Headquarters (Chofu City, Tokyo)

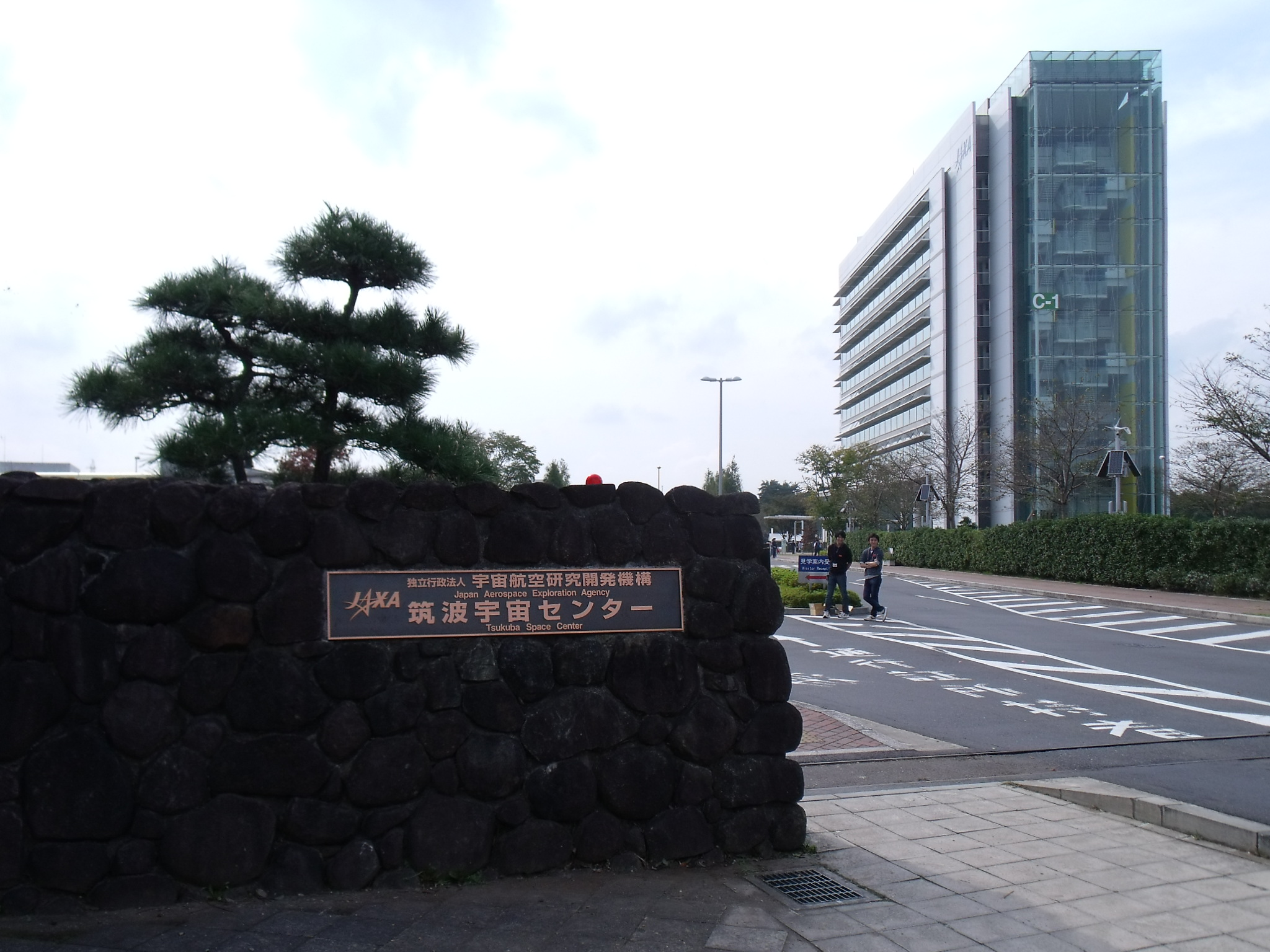
Tsukuba Space Center Main Gate

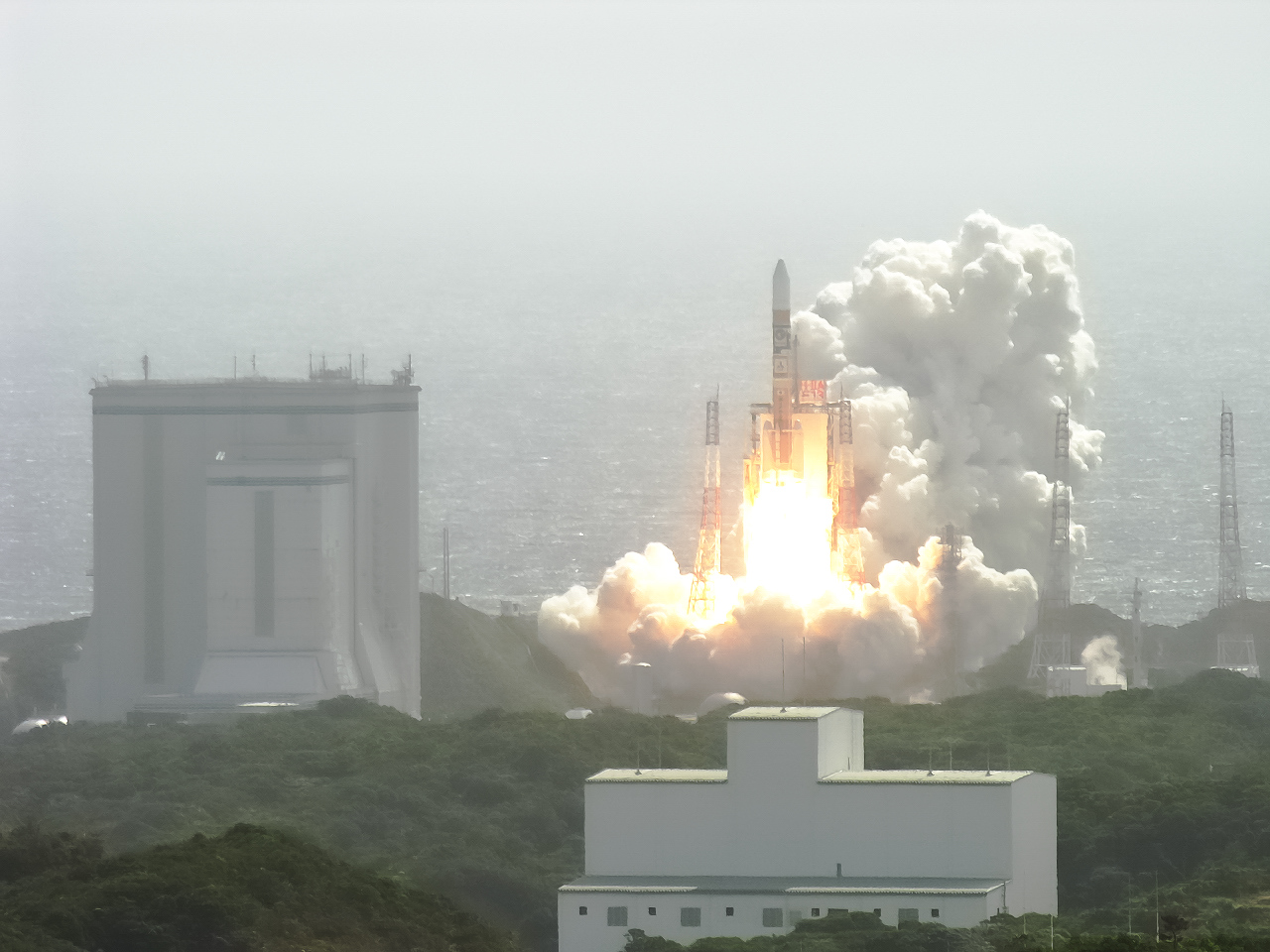
Tanegashima Space Center (Kagoshima Prefecture)

JAXA is composed of the following organizations:

- Space Technology Directorate I
- Space Technology Directorate II
- Human Spaceflight Technology Directorate
- Research and Development Directorate
- Aeronautical Technology Directorate
- Institute of Space and Astronautical Science (ISAS)
- Space Exploration Innovation Hub Center (TansaX)

JAXA has research centers in many locations in Japan, and some offices overseas. Its headquarters are in Chōfu, Tokyo. It also has

- Earth Observation Research Center (EORC), Tokyo
- Earth Observation Center (EOC) in Hatoyama, Saitama
- Noshiro Testing Center (NTC) in Noshiro, Akita – Established in 1962. It carries out development and testing of rocket engines.
- Sanriku Balloon Center (SBC) – Balloons have been launched from this site since 1971.
- Kakuda Space Center (KSPC) in Kakuda, Miyagi – Leads the development of rocket engines. Works mainly with development of liquid-fuel engines.
- Sagamihara Campus (ISAS) in Sagamihara, Kanagawa – Development of experimental equipment for rockets and satellites. Also administrative buildings.
- Tanegashima Space Center in Tanegashima, Kagoshima – currently the launch site for the H-IIA and H3 rockets.
- Tsukuba Space Center (TKSC) in Tsukuba, Ibaraki. This is the center of Japan's space network. It is involved in research and development of satellites and rockets, and tracking and controlling of satellites. It develops experimental equipment for the Japanese Experiment Module ("Kibo"). Training of astronauts also takes place here. For International Space Station operations, the Japanese Flight Control Team is located at the Space Station Integration & Promotion Center (SSIPC) in Tsukuba. SSIPC communicates regularly with ISS crewmembers via S-band audio.
- Uchinoura Space Center in Kimotsuki, Kagoshima – currently the launch site for the Epsilon rocket.

=== Communication ground stations for interplanetary spacecraft ===
- Usuda Deep Space Center (UDSC) is a spacecraft tracking station in Saku, Nagano (originally in Usuda, Nagano; Usuda merged into Saku in 2005), the first deep-space antenna constructed with beam-waveguide technology, and for many years, Japan's only ground station for communication with interplanetary spacecraft in deep space. Opening in 1984, the 64 meter antenna, built by Mitsubishi Electric, primarily operated in the X- and S-band frequencies. Upon completion in 2021, MDSS succeeded UDSC as the primary antenna for JAXA's Deep Space Network.
- Misasa Deep Space Station (MDSS), also in Saku, Nagano (and just over one kilometer northwest from UDSC), also known as GREAT (Ground Station for Deep Space Exploration and Telecommunication) was completed in 2021 at a cost of over ten billion Yen. It is equipped with a 54 meter dish, also built by Mitsubishi Electric, communicating with spacecraft in the X- and Ka-band frequencies. Phase 2 (GREAT2) to improve performance and reliability, in support of future projects, over the previous phase is now in progress.
- Other tracking stations in Okinawa, Masuda, and Katsuura are for satellite tracking and control.

Collaborating with other space agencies:

Previously, JAXA has worked closely with other space agencies in support of their respective deep space projects. Notably, in 2015 NASA's Deep Space Network provided communication and tracking services to the Akatsuki Venus probe through its 34 meter antennas. In October 2021, JAXA provided NASA with data it had received at Misasa from Juno during its flyby of Jupiter's moon Europa.

As part of on-going joint support of deep space missions JAXA, ESA, and NASA are engaged in an effort to improve the X/Ka celestial reference frame as well as a unified X/Ka terrestrial frame to be shared by the three agencies. The 54 meter dish at MDSS enhances X/Ka sensitivity from having an aperture area two and a half times larger than the equivalent antennas in the NASA and ESA network. MDSS improves the network geometry with the first direct north-south baseline (Japan-Australia) in the X/Ka VLBI network, thereby providing four new baselines which will provide optimal geometry for improving declinations.

== See also ==
- Independent Administrative Institution
- Kibō (ISS module)
- Japan Space Systems, another Japanese space agency
- List of aerospace flight test centres
- List of government space agencies
- Space Brothers manga
