= Keiji Tachikawa =

Japanese businessman

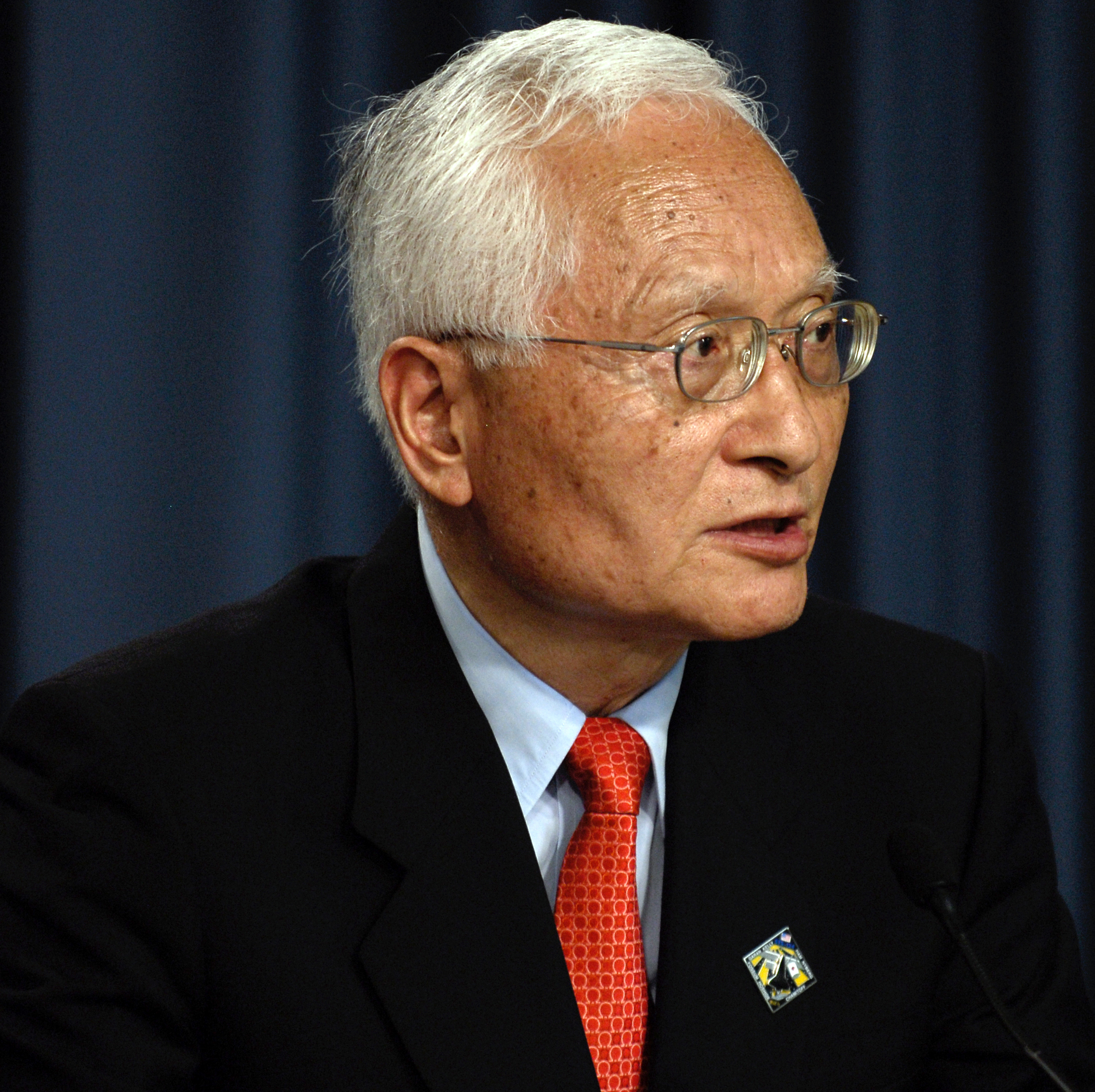
- Tachikawa in 2008
- Born: May 27, 1939 (age 87); Gifu Prefecture, Japan
- Citizenship: Japanese
- Education: University of Tokyo (BS, PhD); MIT Sloan School of Management (MBA)
- Occupations: President, Japan Aerospace Exploration Agency

Keiji Tachikawa (立川 敬二, Tachikawa Keiji; born May 27, 1939 in Gifu Prefecture) is a Japanese businessman who served as president of the Japan Aerospace Exploration Agency (JAXA).

Keiji Tachikawa was born in Gifu Prefecture on May 27, 1939. He graduated from University of Tokyo, Department of Electrical Engineering School of Engineering, in 1962. In 1978, he earned an MBA from the MIT Sloan School of Management. In 1982, he earned a Ph.D Engineering degree in University of Tokyo.

Tachikawa joined Nippon Telegraph & Telephone (NTT) in 1962 as a young engineering graduate. He later joined NTT's subsidiary, NTT DoCoMo, and served as its president from 1998 to 2004.

In 2004, Tachikawa became president of JAXA, to restructure the agency after a 2003 H-IIA rocket launch failure. He served as president until 2013.
