= X-Ray Imaging and Spectroscopy Mission =

Japanese space observatory (2023–Present)

X-Ray Imaging and Spectroscopy Mission (X線分光撮像衛星)
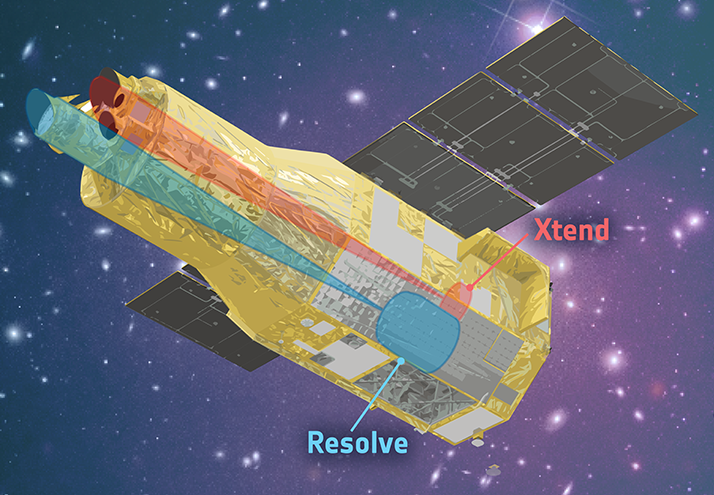
- Diagram of the XRISM observatory
- Names: XRISM; ASTRO-H Successor; ASTRO-H2; XARM
- Mission type: X-ray astronomy
- Operator: JAXA
- COSPAR ID: 2023-137A
- SATCAT no.: 57800
- Website: xrism.isas.jaxa.jp/en www.nasa.gov/content/goddard/xrism-x-ray-imaging-and-spectroscopy-mission
- Mission duration: 3 years (planned); 2 years, 242 days (elapsed)

Spacecraft properties
- Spacecraft type: ASTRO
- Bus: ASTRO-H
- Launch mass: 2,300 kg (5,100 lb)

Start of mission
- Launch date: 6 September 2023, 23:42:11 UTC
- Rocket: H-IIA 202
- Launch site: Tanegashima, LA-Y1
- Contractor: Mitsubishi Heavy Industries

Orbital parameters
- Reference system: Geocentric orbit
- Regime: Low Earth orbit
- Perigee altitude: 550 km
- Apogee altitude: 550 km
- Inclination: 31.0°
- Period: 96.0 minutes

Main telescope
- Name: Soft X-ray Telescope
- Diameter: 45 cm (18 in)
- Focal length: 5.6 m (18 ft)
Instruments
- Resolve: Soft X-ray Spectrometer
- Xtend: Soft X-ray Imager

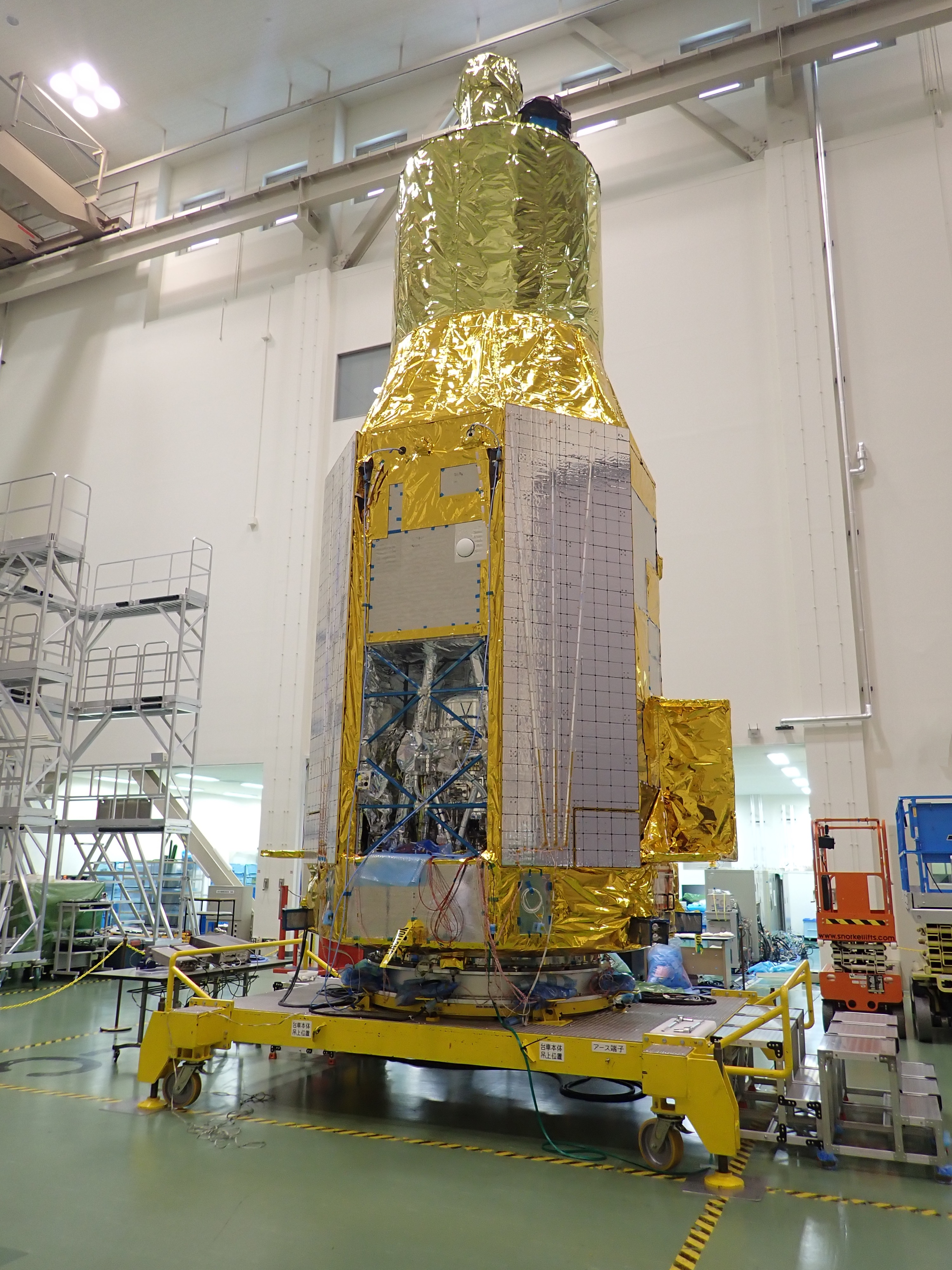
XRISM

The X-Ray Imaging and Spectroscopy Mission (XRISM, pronounced 'crism' or 'krizz-em', as if the X was a chi), is an X-ray space telescope. It is a mission of the Japan Aerospace Exploration Agency (JAXA) in partnership with NASA and ESA, intended to study galaxy clusters, outflows from galaxy nuclei, and dark matter.

XRISM is a next generation X-ray astronomy spacecraft, succeeding the Chandra X-ray Observatory and XMM-Newton. XRISM is intended to fill a gap in observational capabilities between the anticipated retirement of those older X-ray telescopes and the future launch of the planned Advanced Telescope for High Energy Astrophysics (ATHENA). The Hitomi X-ray telescope was intended to fill that gap, but destroyed itself a few weeks after launch in 2016. XRISM replaces Hitomi's role of filling the expected observational gap.

During its early design phase, XRISM was known as the "ASTRO-H Successor" or "ASTRO-H2". After the loss of Hitomi, the name X-ray Astronomy Recovery Mission (XARM) was used, the R in the acronym referring to recovering Hitomi's capabilities. The name was changed to XRISM in 2018 when JAXA formally initiated the project team.

== Overview ==
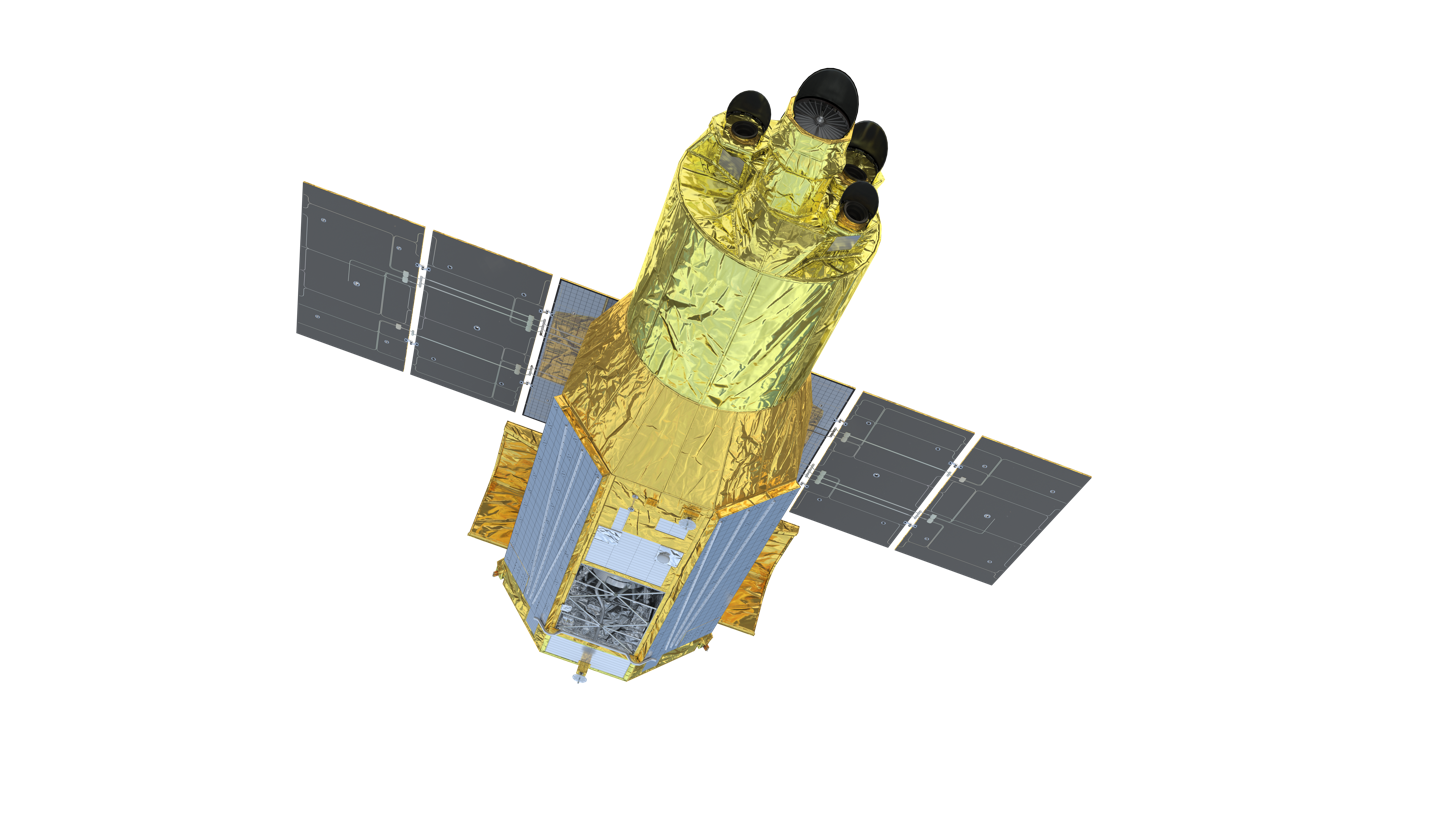
XRISM spacecraft

With the retirement of Suzaku in September 2015, and the detectors onboard Chandra X-ray Observatory and XMM-Newton operating for more than 15 years and gradually aging, the failure of Hitomi meant that X-ray astronomers would have a 13-year blank period in soft X-ray observation, until the launch of ATHENA in 2035. (Note: Saku Tsuneta, director general of ISAS describes ATHENA as being a "super ASTRO-H") This would result in a major setback for the international community, as studies performed by large scale observatories in other wavelengths, such as the James Webb Space Telescope and the Thirty Meter Telescope were planned to commence in the early 2020s, while there would be no telescope to cover the most important part of X-ray astronomy. A lack of new missions could also deprive young astronomers a chance to gain hands-on experience from participating in a project. Along with these reasons, motivation to recover science that was expected as results from Hitomi, became the rationale to initiate the XRISM project. XRISM has been recommended by ISAS's Advisory Council for Research and Management, the High Energy AstroPhysics Association in Japan, NASA Astrophysics Subcommittee, NASA Science Committee, NASA Advisory Council.

With its successful launch in September 2023, XRISM is expected to cover the science that was lost with Hitomi, such as the structure formation of the universe, feedback from galaxies/active galaxy nuclei, and the history of material circulation from stars to galaxy clusters. The space telescope will also take over Hitomi's role as a technology demonstrator for the European Advanced Telescope for High Energy Astrophysics (ATHENA) telescope. Multiple space agencies, including NASA and the European Space Agency (ESA) are participating in the mission. In Japan, the project is led by JAXA's Institute of Space and Astronautical Science (ISAS) division, and U.S. participation is led by NASA's Goddard Space Flight Center (GSFC). The U.S. contribution is expected to cost around US$80 million, which is about the same amount as the contribution to Hitomi.

=== Changes from Hitomi ===
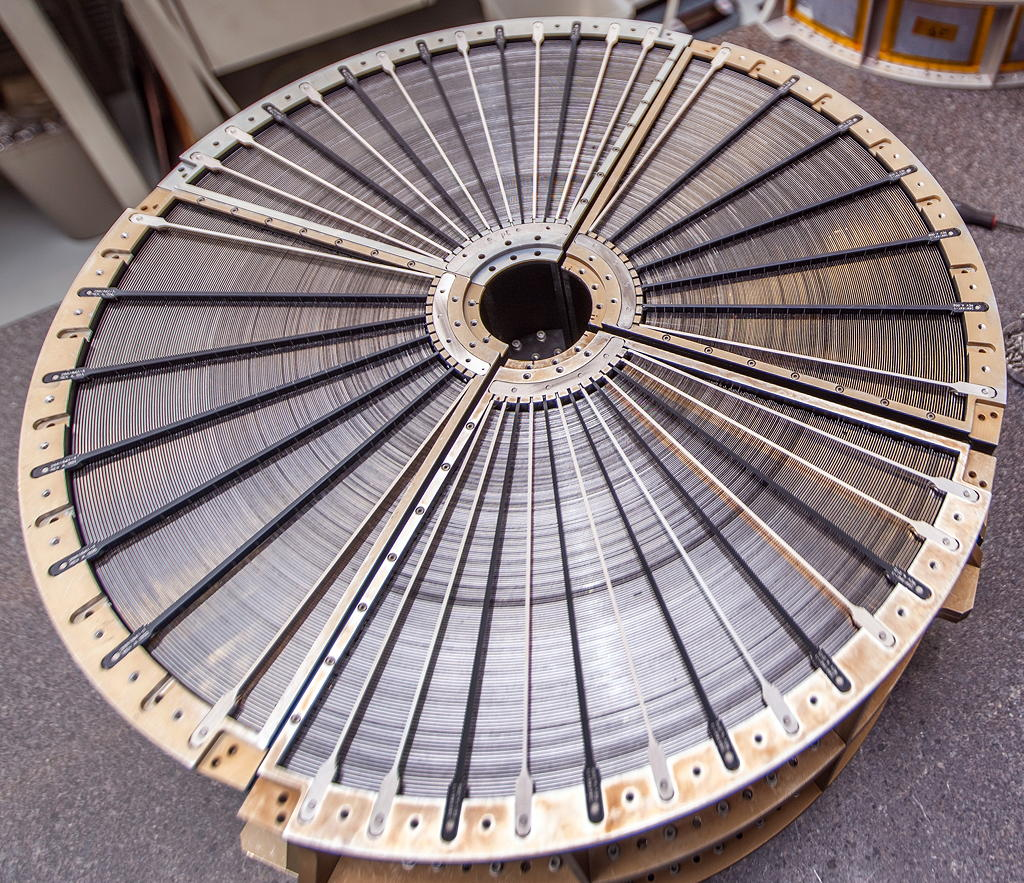
203 foils assembled in the X-ray Mirror Assembly XMA

The X-ray Imaging and Spectroscopy Mission is one of the first projects for ISAS to have a separate project manager (PM) and primary investigator (PI). This is part of ISAS's reform in project management to prevent the recurrence of the Hitomi accident. In traditional ISAS missions, the PM was also responsible for tasks that would typically be allocated to PIs in a NASA mission.

While Hitomi had an array of instruments spanning from soft X-ray to soft gamma ray, XRISM focuses around the Resolve instrument (equivalent to Hitomi's soft X-ray spectrometer), as well as Xtend (SXI), which has a high affinity to Resolve. The elimination of a hard X-ray telescope was justified by the 2012 launch of NASA's NuSTAR satellite, which did not exist when Hitomi (then known as the New X-Ray Telescope, NeXT) was initially formulated. (Note: Hitomi/ASTRO-H was known as New X-ray Telescope (NeXT) during its proposal stage) NuSTAR's spatial and energy resolution is analogous to Hitomi's hard X-ray instruments. Once XRISM's operation starts, collaborative observations with NuSTAR will likely be essential. Meanwhile, the scientific value of the soft and hard X-ray band width boundary has been noted; therefore the option of upgrading XRISM's instruments to be partially capable of hard X-ray observation is under consideration.

A hard X-ray telescope with abilities surpassing Hitomi was proposed in 2017. The FORCE (Focusing On Relativistic universe and Cosmic Evolution) space telescope is a candidate for the next ISAS competitive medium class mission. If selected, FORCE would be launched after the mid-2020s, with an eye towards conducting simultaneous observations with ATHENA.

== History ==
Following the premature termination of the Hitomi mission, on 14 June 2016 JAXA announced their proposal to rebuild the satellite. The XARM pre-project preparation team was formed in October 2016. In the U.S. side, formulation began in the summer of 2017. In June 2017, ESA announced that they would participate in XARM as a mission of opportunity.

== Instruments ==
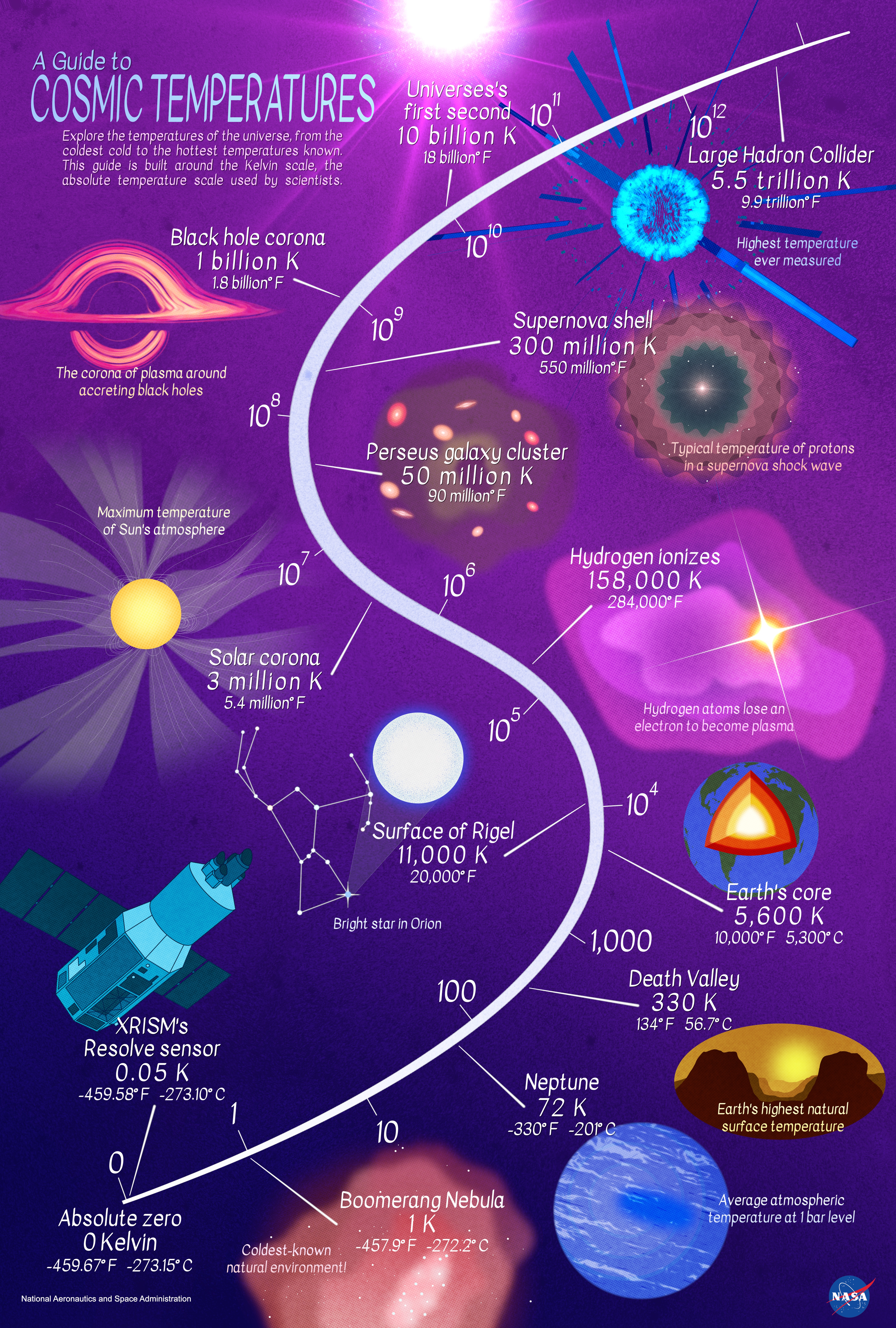
An illustration of the range of cosmic temperatures including the temperature at which XRISM will work to ensure the optimal functioning of its instruments

XRISM carries two instruments for studying the soft X-ray energy range, Resolve and Xtend. The satellite has separate telescopes for each of the instruments, SXT-I (Soft X-ray Telescope for Imager) and SXT-S (Soft X-ray Telescope for Spectrometer). Both telescopes have a focal length of 5.6 m (18 ft).

=== Resolve ===
Resolve is an X-ray micro calorimeter developed by NASA and the Goddard Space Flight Center. The instrument is a duplicate version of its Hitomi predecessor. It used some space-qualified hardware left from the manufacture of Hitomi 's SXS.

=== Xtend ===
Xtend is an X-ray CCD camera. Xtend improves on the energy resolution of Hitomi's SXI.

== Launch ==
JAXA launched XRISM on 6 September 2023 at 23:42 UTC (7 September 08:42 Japan Standard Time) using an H-IIA rocket from Tanegashima Space Center. XRISM was successfully inserted into orbit on the same day, and the accompanying launch payload, SLIM, began its multi-month journey to the Moon.

A protective shutter over the Resolve instrument's detector has failed to open. This does not prevent the instrument from operating, but limits it to observing X-rays of energy 1800 eV and above, as opposed to the planned 300 eV.

== See also ==
- Suzaku
- List of X-ray space telescopes
- X-ray astronomy
