= HALCA =

Japanese space radio telescope

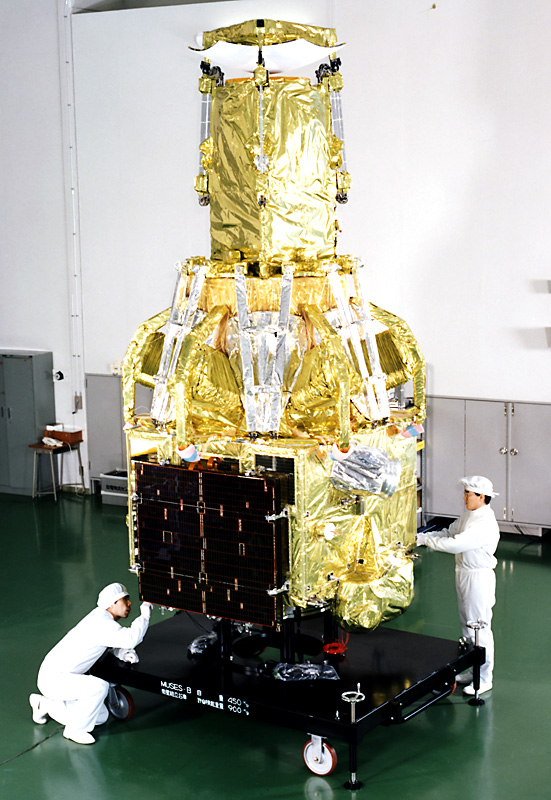
- HALCA after the final assembly during a solar battery check at Uchinoura
- Names: MUSES-B; VSOP; Haruka (はるか)
- Mission type: Astronomy
- Operator: ISAS
- COSPAR ID: 1997-005A
- SATCAT no.: 24720
- Website: HALCA Home
- Mission duration: 8 years, 9 months, 18 days

Spacecraft properties
- Manufacturer: NEC Toshiba Space Systems
- Launch mass: 830 kg (1,830 lb)
- Dimensions: 1.5 m × 1 m (4.9 ft × 3.3 ft)

Start of mission
- Launch date: 04:50, February 12, 1997 (UTC)
- Rocket: M-5-1
- Launch site: Kagoshima M-V Pad

End of mission
- Disposal: Decommissioned
- Deactivated: November 30, 2005

Orbital parameters
- Reference system: Geocentric
- Regime: Highly elliptical
- Semi-major axis: 17,259 km (10,724 mi)
- Eccentricity: 0.5999671
- Perigee altitude: 533.5 km (331.5 mi)
- Apogee altitude: 21,244.1 km (13,200.5 mi)
- Inclination: 31.1880 degrees
- Period: 376.1 minutes
- RAAN: 127.6566 degrees
- Argument of perigee: 143.9533 degrees
- Mean anomaly: 358.3371 degrees
- Mean motion: 3.82867831 rev/day
- Epoch: 28 April 2016, 09:56:58 UTC
- Revolution no.: 26766

Main telescope
- Type: Mesh antenna
- Diameter: 8 m (26 ft)
- Wavelengths: 1.3, 6, 18 cm (radio)

HALCA (Highly Advanced Laboratory for Communications and Astronomy), also known for its project name VSOP (VLBI Space Observatory Programme), the code name MUSES-B (for the second of the Mu Space Engineering Spacecraft series), or just Haruka ("far away, distant" (はるか)) was a Japanese 8 meter diameter radio telescope satellite which was used for Very Long Baseline Interferometry (VLBI). It was the first such space-borne dedicated VLBI mission.

== History ==
It was placed in a highly elliptical orbit with an apogee altitude of 21,400 km and a perigee altitude of 560 km, with an orbital period of approximately 6.3 hours. This orbit allowed imaging of celestial radio sources by the satellite in conjunction with an array of ground-based radio telescopes, such that both good (u,v) plane coverage and very high resolution were obtained.

Although designed to observe in three frequency bands: 1.6 GHz, 5.0 GHz, and 22 GHz, it was found that the sensitivity of the 22 GHz band had severely degraded after orbital deployment, probably caused by vibrational deformation of the dish shape at launch, thus limiting observations to the 1.6 GHz and 5.0 GHz bands.

HALCA was launched in February 1997 from Kagoshima Space Center, and made its final VSOP observations in October 2003, far exceeding its 3-year predicted lifespan, before the loss of attitude control. All operations were officially ended in November 2005.

A follow-up mission ASTRO-G (VSOP-2) was planned, with a proposed launch date of 2012, but the project was eventually cancelled in 2011 due to increasing costs and the difficulties of achieving its science goals. It was expected to achieve resolutions up to ten times higher and up to ten times greater sensitivity than its predecessor HALCA.

The cancellation of ASTRO-G left the Russian Spektr-R mission as the only then operational space VLBI facility. Spektr-R stopped operating in 2019.

== Antenna ==
The large 8 meter antenna was designed to unfold in space as the unfolded configuration did not fit inside the rocket fairing. The antenna was a metal mesh of 6000 cables. To form an ideal shape the length of the cables were adjusted on the backside of the antenna. One concern was that the cables could entangle. The deployment of the main reflector started on February 27, 1997. The deployment was done over three hours on the first day and was completed in 20 minutes during the next day.

== Highlights ==
- Observations of hydroxyl masers and pulsars at 1.6 GHz
- Detection of interference fringes for quasar PKS1519-273 between HALCA and terrestrial radio telescopes
- Routines imaging of quasars and radio galaxies etc. by means of experimental VLBI observations with HALCA and terrestrial radio telescope networks

== Gallery ==
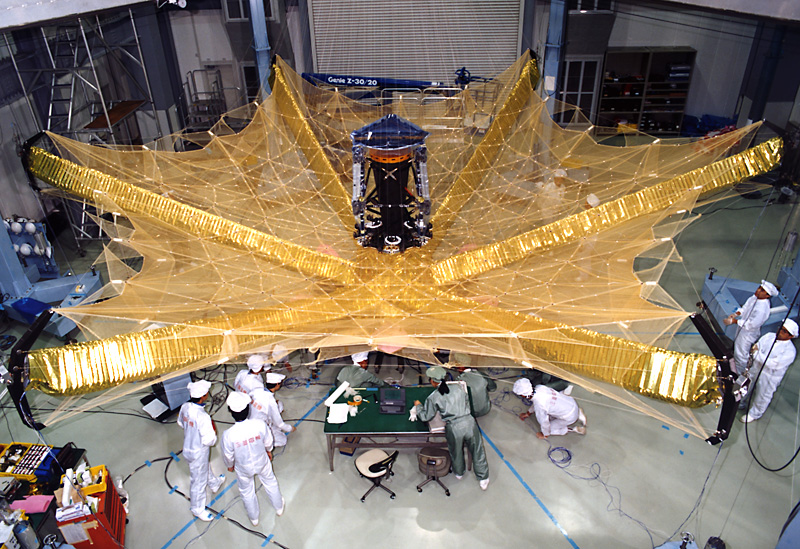
Haruka during a deployment test

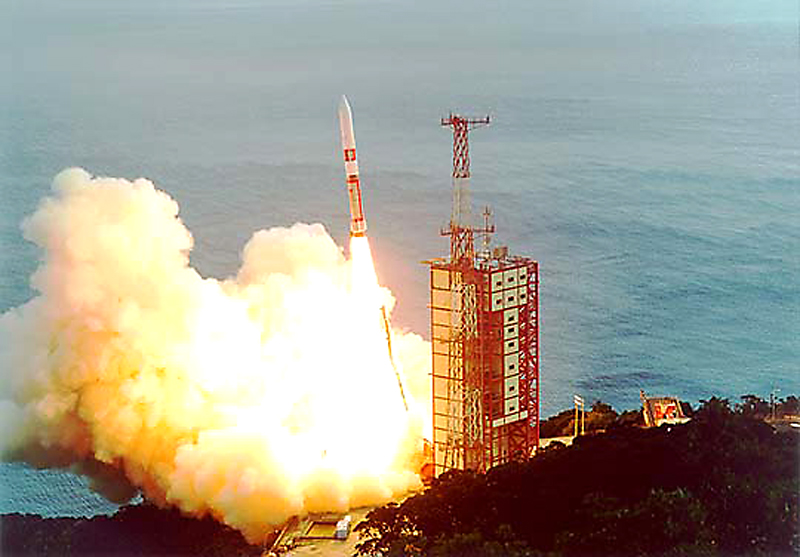
Launch of Haruka on board of a M-V rocket

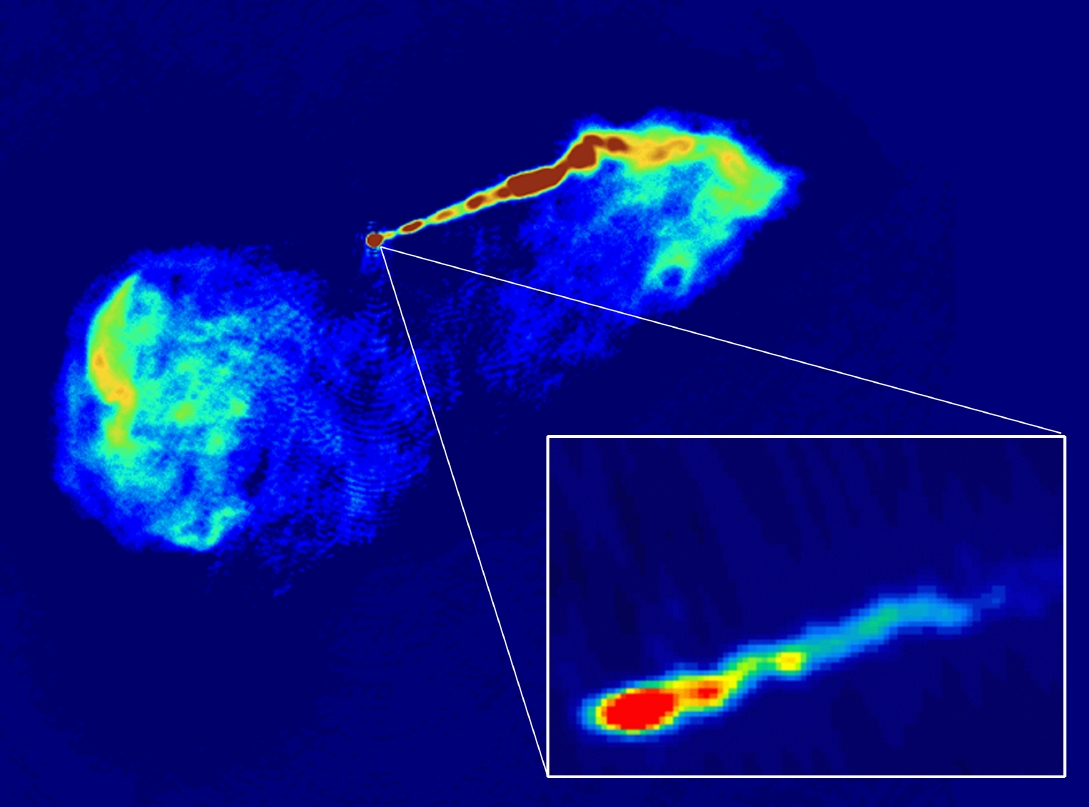
The large image shows M87 as observed with the VLA, the insert shows observations with the VLBA and HALCA

Multi-epoch observations of the quasar VSOP J1927+7358, observed with VSOP between 1997 and 2001

Animation of HALCA around the Earth
HALCA · Earth
