= Hitomi (satellite) =

Failed Japanese X-ray astronomy satellite

Hitomi (ひとみ)
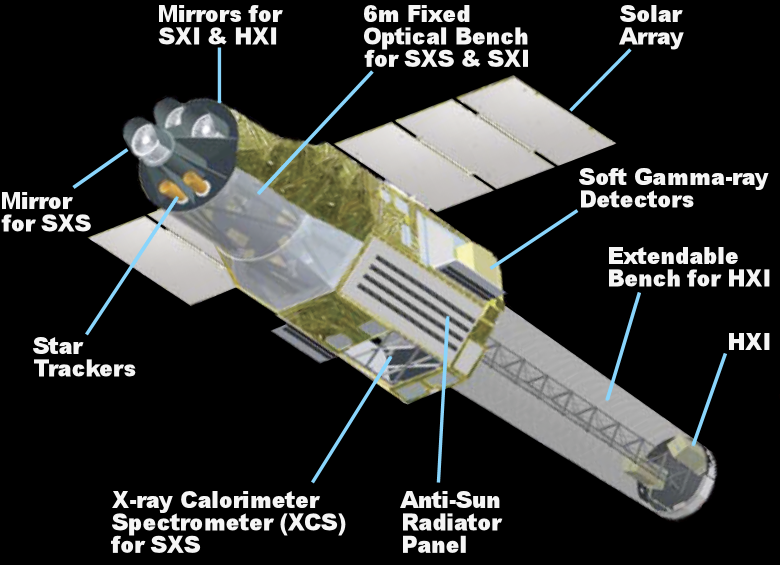
- Artist depiction of Hitomi satellite
- Names: ASTRO-H; New X-ray Telescope (NeXT)
- Mission type: X-ray astronomy
- Operator: JAXA
- COSPAR ID: 2016-012A
- SATCAT no.: 41337
- Mission duration: 3 years (planned) ≈37 days and 16 hours (achieved)

Spacecraft properties
- Launch mass: 2,700 kg (6,000 lb)
- Dimensions: Length: 14 m (46 ft)
- Power: 3500 watts

Start of mission
- Launch date: 17 February 2016, 08:45 UTC
- Rocket: H-IIA 202, No. 30
- Launch site: Tanegashima Space Center

End of mission
- Disposal: Destroyed on orbit
- Destroyed: 26 March 2016, ≈01:42 UTC

Orbital parameters
- Reference system: Geocentric orbit
- Regime: Low Earth orbit
- Perigee altitude: 559.85 km (347.87 mi)
- Apogee altitude: 581.10 km (361.08 mi)
- Inclination: 31.01°
- Period: 96.0 minutes
Instruments
- SXS: Soft X-ray Spectrometer
- HXI: Hard X-ray Imager
- SXI: Soft X-ray Imager
- SGD: Soft Gamma-ray Detector

Hitomi (Japanese: ひとみ), also known as ASTRO-H and New X-ray Telescope (NeXT), was an X-ray astronomy satellite commissioned by the Japan Aerospace Exploration Agency (JAXA) for studying extremely energetic processes in the Universe. The space observatory was designed to extend the research conducted by the Advanced Satellite for Cosmology and Astrophysics (ASCA) by investigating the hard X-ray band above 10 keV. The satellite was originally called New X-ray Telescope; at the time of launch it was called ASTRO-H. After it was placed in orbit and its solar panels deployed, it was renamed Hitomi. The spacecraft was launched on 17 February 2016 and contact was lost on 26 March 2016, due to multiple incidents with the attitude control system leading to an uncontrolled spin rate and breakup of structurally weak elements.

== Name ==
The new name refers to the pupil of an eye, and to a legend of a painting of four dragons. The word Hitomi generally means "eye", and specifically the pupil, or entrance window of the eye – the aperture. There is also an ancient legend that inspires the name Hitomi. "One day, many years ago, a painter was drawing four white dragons on a street. He finished drawing the dragons, but without "Hitomi". People who looked at the painting said "why don't you paint Hitomi, it is not complete. The painter hesitated, but people pressured him. The painter then drew Hitomi on two of the four dragons. Immediately, these dragons came to life and flew up into the sky. The two dragons without Hitomi remained still". The inspiration of this story is that Hitomi is regarded as the "One last, but most important part", and so we wish ASTRO-H to be the essential mission to solve mysteries of the universe in X-rays. Hitomi refers to the aperture of the eye, the part where incoming light is absorbed. From this, Hitomi reminds us of a black hole. We will observe Hitomi in the Universe using the Hitomi satellite.

== Objectives ==
Hitomi's objectives were to explore the large-scale structure and evolution of the universe, as well as the distribution of dark matter within galaxy clusters and how the galaxy clusters evolve over time; how matter behaves in strong gravitational fields (such as matter inspiraling into black holes), to explore the physical conditions in regions where cosmic rays are accelerated, as well as observing supernovae. In order to achieve this, it was designed to be capable of:

- Imaging and spectroscopic measurements with a hard X-ray telescope;
- Spectroscopic observations with an extremely high energy resolution using the micro-calorimeter;
- Sensitive wideband observations over the energy range 0.3–600 keV.

It was the sixth of a series of JAXA X-ray satellites, which started in 1979, and it was designed to observe sources that are an order of magnitude fainter than its predecessor, Suzaku. Its planned mission length was three years. At the time of launch, two other large X-ray satellites were carrying out observations in orbit: the Chandra X-ray Observatory and XMM-Newton, both of which were launched in 1999.

== Instruments ==
The probe carried four instruments and six detectors to observe photons with energies ranging from soft X-rays to gamma rays, with a high energy resolution. Hitomi was built by an international collaboration led by JAXA with over 70 contributing institutions in Japan, the United States, Canada, and Europe, and over 160 scientists. With a mass of 2,700 kg (6,000 lb), At launch, Hitomi was the heaviest Japanese X-ray mission. The satellite is about 14 m (46 ft) in length.

Two soft X-ray telescopes (SXT-S, SXT-I), with focal lengths of 5.6 m (18 ft), focus light onto a soft X-ray Spectrometer (SXS), provided by NASA, with an energy range of 0.4–12 keV for high-resolution X-ray spectroscopy, and a soft X-ray imager (SXI), with an energy range of 0.3–12 keV.

Two hard X-ray telescopes (HXT), with a focus length of 12 m (39 ft), focus light onto two hard X-ray imagers (HXI), with energy range 5–80 keV, which are mounted on a plate placed at the end of the 6 m (20 ft) extendable optical bench (EOB) that is deployed once the satellite is in orbit. The Canadian Space Agency (CSA) provided the Canadian ASTRO-H Metrology System (CAMS), which is a laser alignment system that will be used to measure the distortions in the extendible optical bench.

Two soft Gamma-ray detectors (SGD), each containing three units, were mounted on two sides of the satellite, using non-focusing detectors to observe soft gamma-ray emission with energies from 60 to 600 KeV.

The Netherlands Institute for Space Research (SRON) in collaboration with the University of Geneva provided the filter-wheel and calibration source for the spectrometer.

Focusing X-rays with a Wolter Type-1 optical system

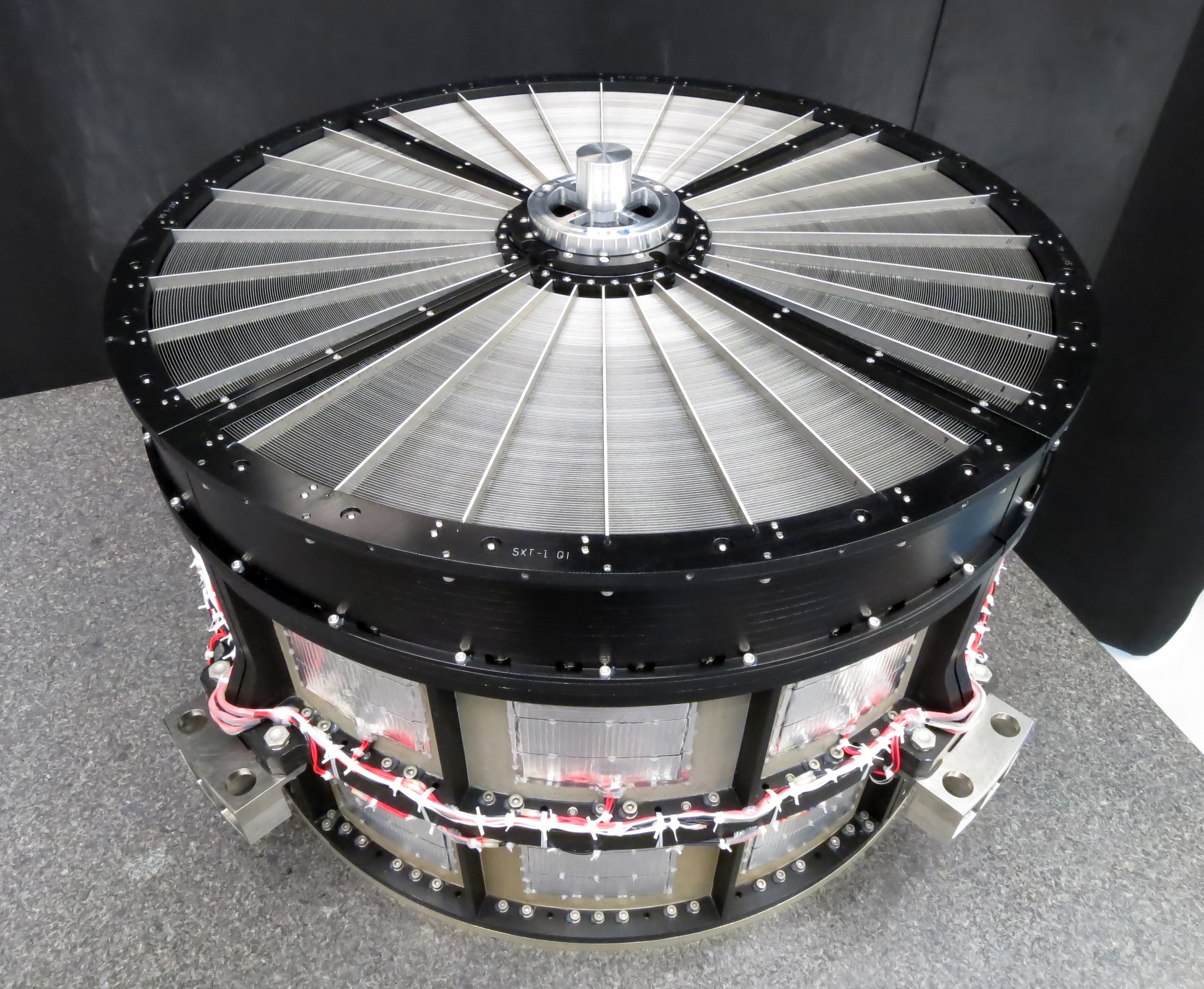
Soft X-ray mirror assembled by NASA

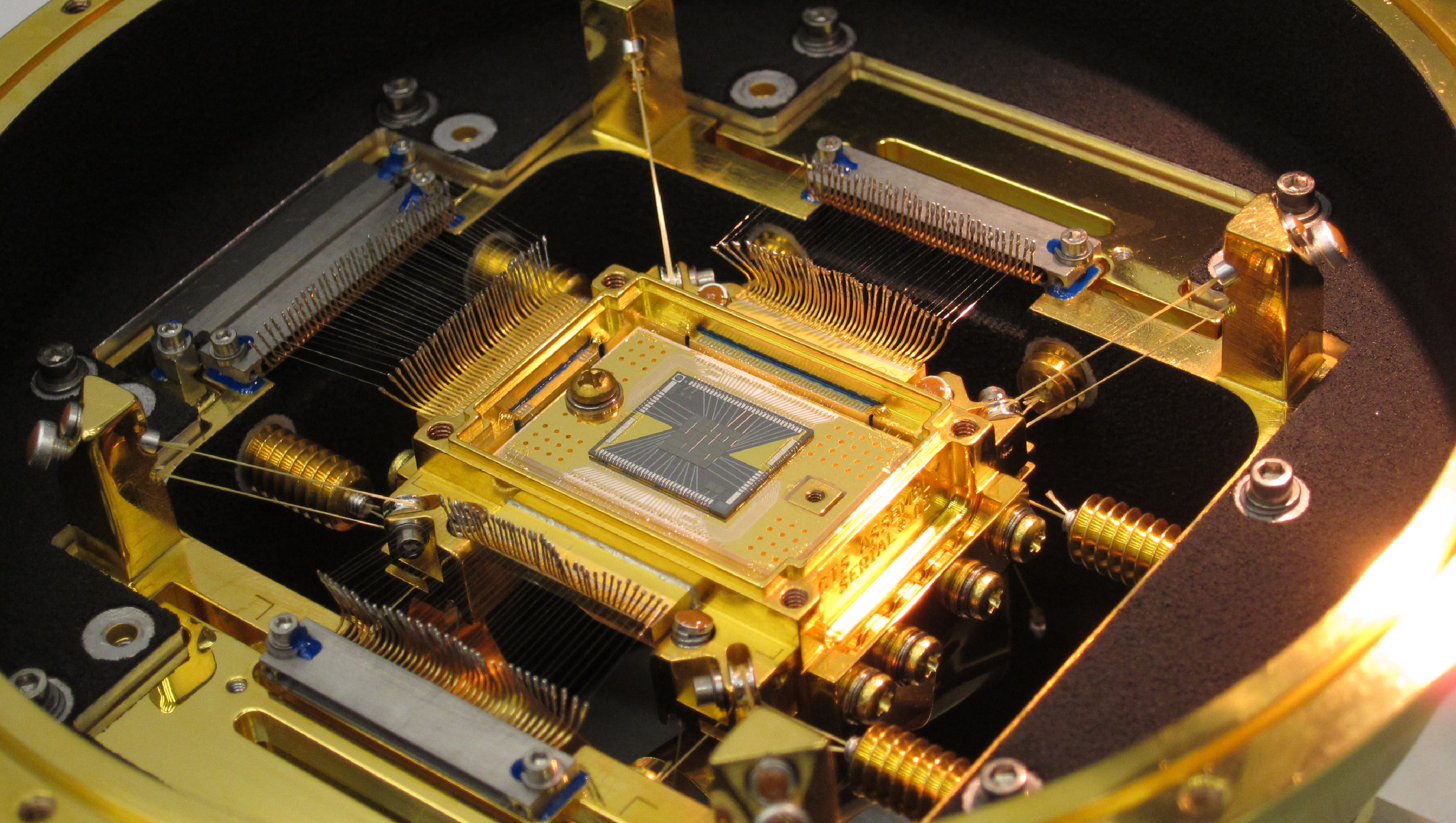
Microcalorimeter array of the Soft X-ray Spectrometer. The five-millimeter square forms a 36-pixel array. Each pixel is 0.824 millimeter on a side. The detector’s field of view is approximately three arcminutes.

== Launch ==
The launch of the satellite was planned for 2013 as of 2008, later revised to 2015 as of 2013. As of early February 2016, it was planned for 12 February, but was delayed due to poor weather forecasts.

Hitomi launched on 17 February 2016 at 08:45 UTC into a low Earth orbit of approximately 575 km (357 mi). The circular orbit had an orbital period of around 96 minutes, and an orbital inclination of 31.01°. It was launched from the Tanegashima Space Center on board an H-IIA launch vehicle. 14 minutes after launch, the satellite separated from the launch vehicle. The solar arrays later deployed according to plan, and it began its on-orbit checkout.

== Operations ==
Measurements by Hitomi have allowed scientists to track the motion of X-ray-emitting gas at the heart of the Perseus cluster of galaxies for the first time. Using the Soft X-ray Spectrometer, astronomers have mapped the motion of X-ray-emitting gas in a cluster of galaxies and shown it moves at cosmically modest speeds. The total range of gas velocities directed toward or away from Earth within the area observed by Hitomi was found to be about 365,000 miles an hour (590,000 kilometers per hour). The observed velocity range indicates that turbulence is responsible for only about 4 percent of the total gas pressure.

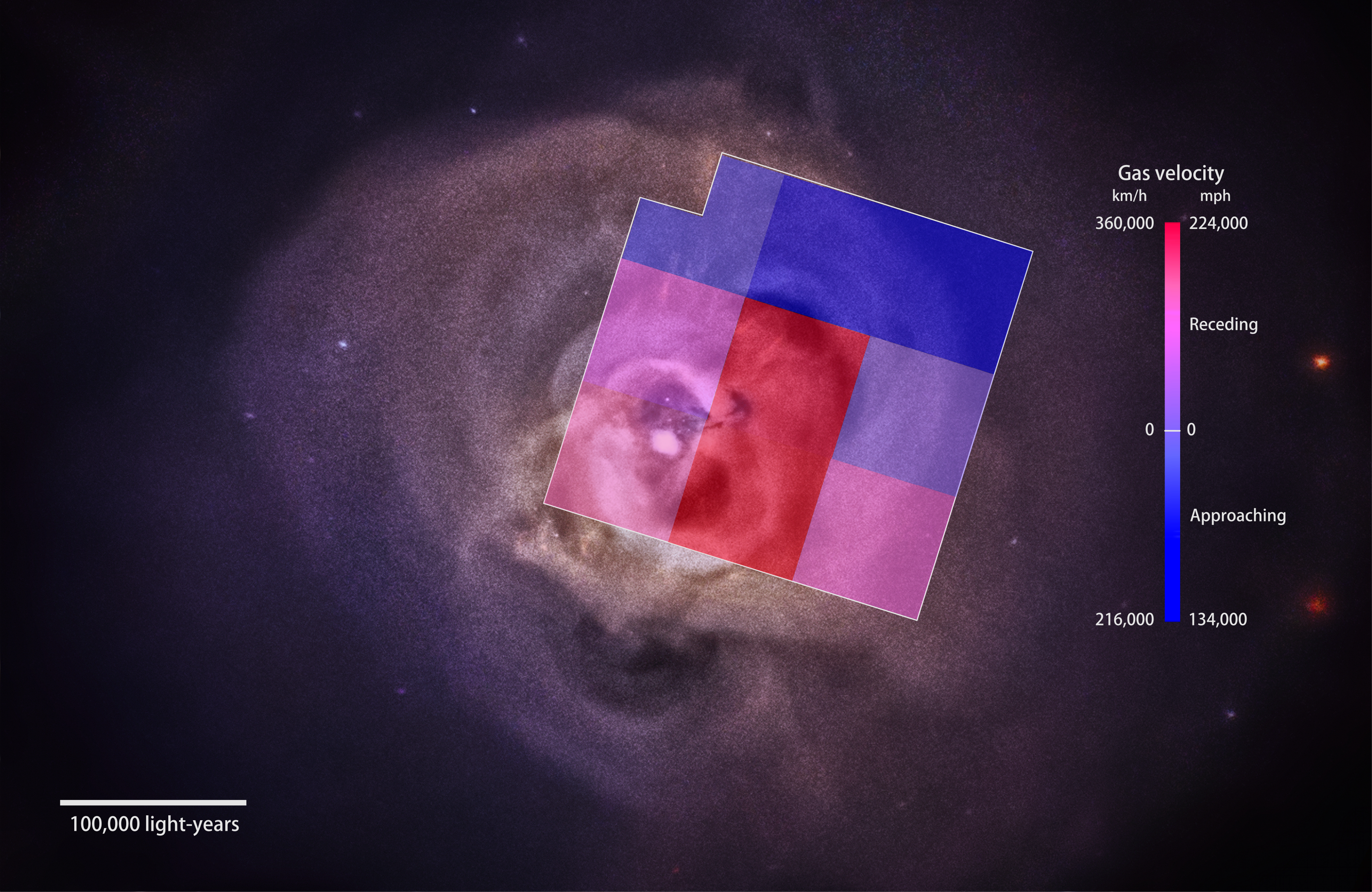
Map of the motion of hot X-ray-emitting gas in the Perseus galaxy cluster. The square overlay, which spans about 195,000 light-years at the cluster's distance, shows the area observed by Hitomi.

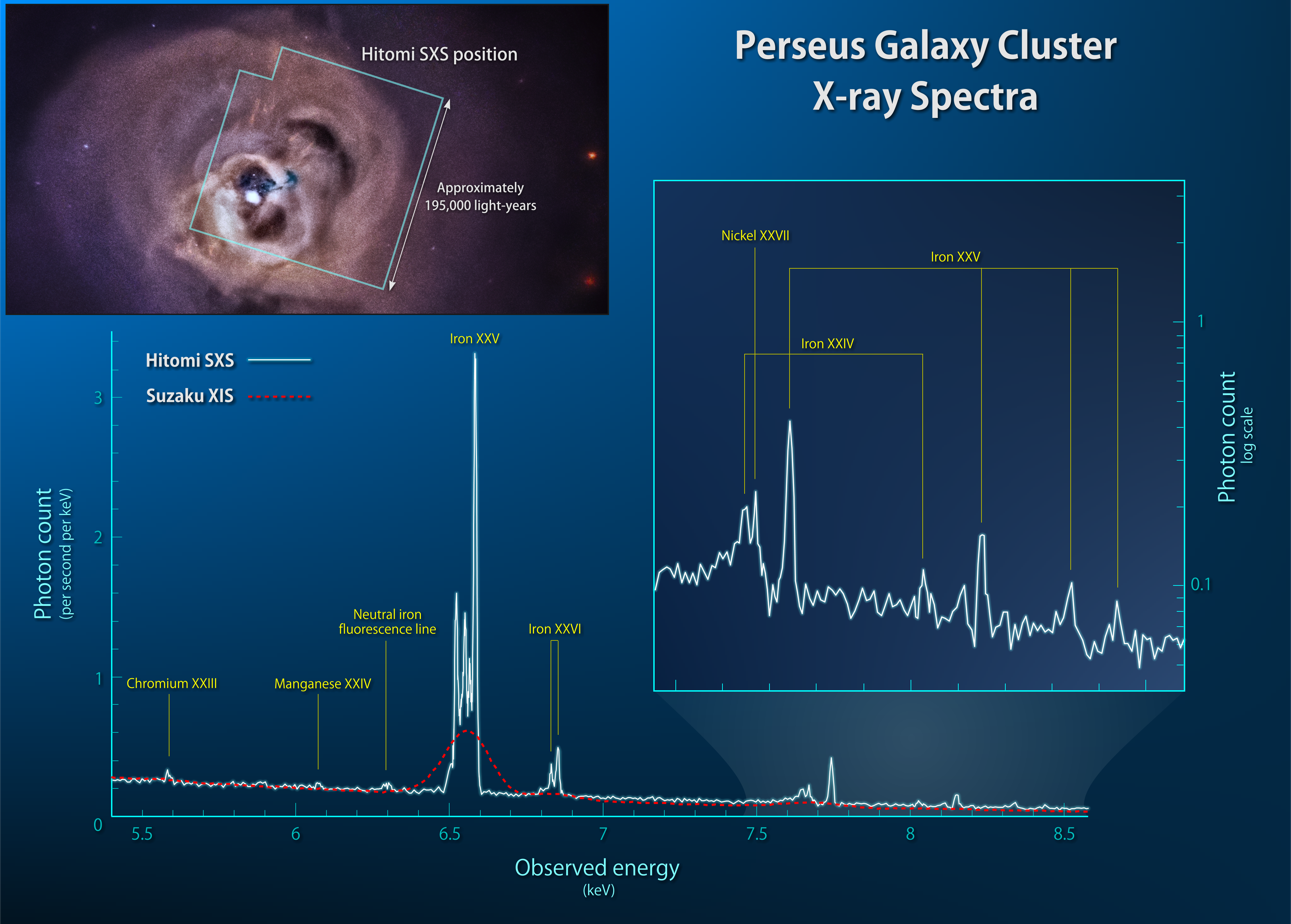
The X-ray spectrum observed by Hitomi's Soft X-ray Imaging Spectrometer (SXS) reveals details of the million-degree gas filling the Perseus galaxy cluster.

== Loss of spacecraft ==
On 27 March 2016, JAXA reported that communication with Hitomi had "failed from the start of its operation" on 26 March 2016 at 07:40 UTC. On the same day, the U.S. Joint Space Operations Center (JSpOC) announced on Twitter that it had observed a breakup of the satellite into 5 pieces at 08:20 UTC on 26 March 2016, and its orbit also suddenly changed on the same day. Later analysis by the JSpOC found that the fragmentation likely took place around 01:42 UTC, but that there was no evidence the spacecraft had been struck by debris. Between 26 and 28 March 2016, JAXA reported receiving three brief signals from Hitomi; while the signals were offset by 200 kHz from what was expected from Hitomi, their direction of origin and time of reception suggested they were legitimate. Later analysis, however, determined that the signals were not from Hitomi but from an unknown radio source not registered with the International Telecommunication Union.

JAXA stated they were working to recover communication and control over the spacecraft, but that "the recovery will require months, not days". Initially suggested possibilities for the communication loss is that a helium gas leak, battery explosion, or stuck-open thruster caused the satellite to start rotating, rather than a catastrophic failure. JAXA announced on 1 April 2016 that Hitomi had lost attitude control at around 19:10 UTC on 25 March 2016. After analysing engineering data from just before the communication loss, however, no problems were noted with either the helium tank or batteries.

The same day, JSpOC released orbital data for ten detected pieces of debris, five more than originally reported, including one piece that was large enough to initially be confused with the main body of the spacecraft. Amateur trackers observed what was believed to be Hitomi tumbling in orbit, with reports of the main spacecraft body (Object A) rotating once every 1.3 or 2.6 seconds, and the next largest piece (Object L) rotating every 10 seconds.

JAXA ceased efforts to recover the satellite on 28 April 2016, switching focus to anomaly investigation. It was determined that the chain of events that led to the spacecraft's loss began with its inertial reference unit (IRU) reporting a rotation of 21.7° per hour at 19:10 UTC on 25 March 2016, though the vehicle was actually stable. The attitude control system attempted to use Hitomi's reaction wheels to counteract the non-existent spin, which caused the spacecraft to rotate in the opposite direction. Because the IRU continued to report faulty data, the reaction wheels began to accumulate excessive momentum, tripping the spacecraft's computer into taking the vehicle into "safe hold" mode. Attitude control then tried to use its thrusters to stabilise the spacecraft; the Sun sensor was unable to lock on to the Sun's position, and continued thruster firings caused Hitomi to rotate even faster due to an incorrect software setting. Because of this excessive rotation rate, early on 26 March 2016 several parts of the spacecraft broke away, likely including both solar arrays and the extended optical bench.

== Replacement ==
Reports of a Hitomi replacement mission first surfaced on 21 June 2016. According to an article from Kyodo News, JAXA was considering a launch of "Hitomi 2" in the early 2020s aboard Japan's new H3 launch vehicle. The spacecraft would be a near-copy of Hitomi. However, a 27 June 2016 article from The Nikkei stated that some within the Ministry of Education, Culture, Sports, Science and Technology believed it was too early to grant funding for a Hitomi replacement. The article also noted that NASA had expressed support for a replacement mission led by Japan.

On 14 July 2016, JAXA published a press release regarding the ongoing study of a successor. According to the press release, the spacecraft would be a remanufacture but with countermeasures reflecting Hitomi's loss, and would be launched in 2020 on a H-IIA launch vehicle. The scientific mission of the "ASTRO-H Successor" would be based around the SXS instrument. The Minister of Education, Culture, Sports, Science and Technology, Hiroshi Hase, stated during a press conference on 15 July 2016 that funding for Hitomi's successor will be allocated in the fiscal year 2017 budget request, and that he intends to accept the successor mission on the condition that the investigation of Hitomi's destruction is completed and measures to prevent recurrence are done accordingly. The X-Ray Imaging and Spectroscopy Mission (XRISM) was approved by JAXA and NASA in April 2017, and successfully launched in September 2023.

== See also ==
- List of X-ray space telescopes
- X-ray astronomy
- List of software bugs
