= Basic Space Law =

Japanese law ratified in 2008

Basic Space Law 宇宙基本法

National Diet
- Citation: Law No. 43 of Heisei 20
- Enacted by: House of Representatives
- Enacted by: House of Councillors
- Effective: 27 August 2008
- Administered by: Cabinet Office
- Status: Current legislation

The Basic Space Law (宇宙基本法, Uchū Kihon Hou), is a Japanese space law that governs space-related activities.
