= Yasuo Tanaka (astronomer) =

Japanese astrophysicist

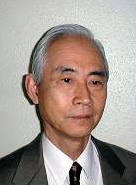
- Born: 18 March 1931; Osaka, Japan
- Died: 18 January 2018 (aged 86)
- Education: Osaka University
- Known for: Pioneer in X-ray astronomy
- Scientific career
- Fields: Astrophysics
- Workplaces: University of Tokyo; Nagoya University

Yasuo Tanaka (田中 靖郎, Tanaka Yasuo; 18 March 1931 – 18 January 2018) was a Japanese astrophysicist and a member of the Japan Academy. He was professor emeritus at the University of Tokyo and Institute of Space and Astronautical Science (ISAS) (part of JAXA) in Kanagawa, Japan and guest scientist at the Max Planck Institute for Extraterrestrial Physics in Garching, Germany.

He was a pioneer in X-ray astronomy, leading the development and operation of the Ginga, Tenma, and ASCA satellites. He died on 18 January 2018.

== Awards and honors ==
Awards

- Nishina Memorial Prize (1985)
- Toray Science and Technology Prize (1989)
- Imperial Prize of the Japan Academy (1993)
- James Craig Watson Medal (1994)
- Foreign Associate, National Academy of Sciences (1998)
- Bruno Rossi Prize (2001)
- Person of Cultural Merit (2011)

Named after him

- Asteroid 4387 Tanaka

Other

- Foreign member of the Royal Netherlands Academy of Arts and Sciences (1989)
- The American Astronomical Society named him an Honorary Member (2012)
