= 1976 in spaceflight =

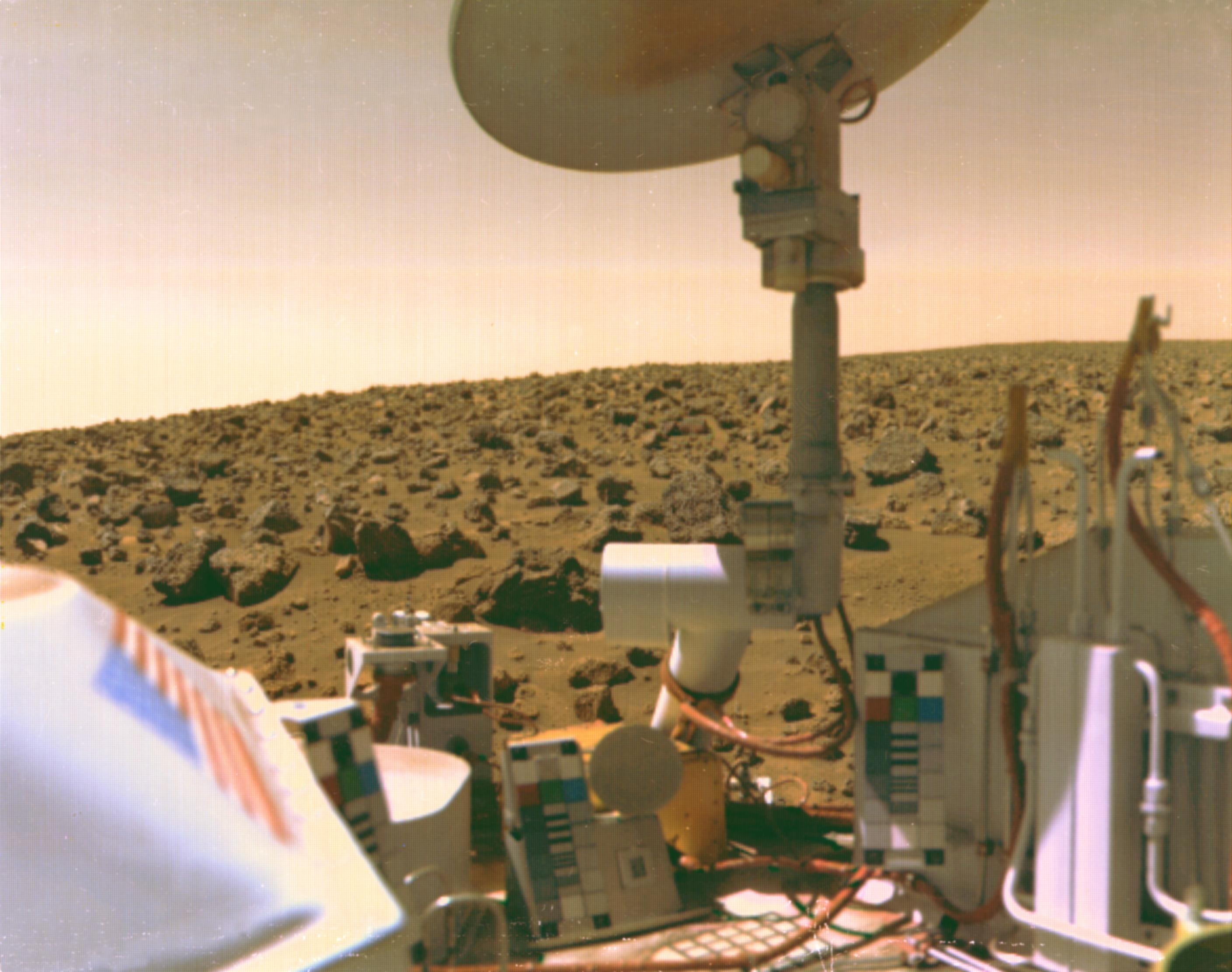
- Viking 2 on the surface of Mars

Orbital launches
- First: 6 January
- Last: 28 December
- Total: 131
- Catalogued: 128

National firsts
- Satellite: Indonesia

Rockets
- Maiden flights: Thor DSV-2U
- Retirements: Voskhod; Scout B-1; Soyuz; Soyuz-M; Thor-Burner; Luna sample return ascent stage

Crewed flights
- Orbital: 3
- Total travellers: 6

1976 in spaceflight

The following is an outline of 1976 in spaceflight.

== Launches ==
Date and time (UTC)	Rocket	Flight number	Launch site		LSP	
Date and time (UTC)	Payload	Operator	Orbit	Function	Decay (UTC)	Outcome
Date and time (UTC)	Remarks					
=== January ===
6 January; 04:52	(Soviet Union) Kosmos-3M		Plesetsk Site 132/1			
6 January; 04:52	(Soviet Union) Kosmos 787 (Tselina-O 27)		Low Earth	SIGINT	12 December 1980	Successful
7 January; 15:34	(Soviet Union) Voskhod		Plesetsk Site 43/3			
7 January; 15:34	(Soviet Union) Kosmos 788 (Zenit-4MK/Germes 54)	GRU USSR	Low Earth	Reconnaissance	20 January	Successful
15 January; 05:34:00	(United States) Titan IIIE/Star-37		(United States) Cape Canaveral SLC-41		(United States) NASA	
15 January; 05:34:00	(United States) (Germany) Helios-B	NASA / DFVLR	Heliocentric	Solar probe	In orbit	Successful
15 January; 05:34:00	Achieved a closest approach to the Sun of 43.432 million km (0.29 AU) on 17 April 1976, the closest approach achieved by an artificial satellite; it was succeeded by the Parker Solar Probe in 2018.					
17 January; 23:27	(United States) Delta 2914	D-119	(United States) Cape Canaveral SLC-17B			
17 January; 23:27	(United States) (Canada) CTS Hermes	NASA / CSA	Geosynchronous	Experimental communications	In orbit	Successful
20 January; 17:07	(Soviet Union) Kosmos-3M		(Soviet Union) Plesetsk Site 132/1			
20 January; 17:07	(Soviet Union) Kosmos 789 (Parus 5)		Low Earth	Navigation	In orbit	Successful
22 January; 11:38	(Soviet Union) Molniya-M/Blok ML		(Soviet Union) Baikonur Site 1/5			
22 January; 11:38	(Soviet Union) Molniya-1K 32		Molniya orbit	Communications	In orbit	Successful
22 January; 22:26	(Soviet Union) Kosmos-3M		Plesetsk Site 132/1			
22 January; 22:26	(Soviet Union) Kosmos 790 (Tselina-O 30)		Low Earth	SIGINT	12 November 1980	Successful
28 January; 10:39	(Soviet Union) Kosmos-3M		Plesetsk Site 132/1			
28 January; 10:39	(Soviet Union) Kosmos 791 (Strela-1M 105)		Low Earth	Communications	In orbit	Successful
28 January; 10:39	(Soviet Union) Kosmos 792 (Strela-1M 106)		Low Earth	Communications	In orbit	Successful
28 January; 10:39	(Soviet Union) Kosmos 793 (Strela-1M 107)		Low Earth	Communications	In orbit	Successful
28 January; 10:39	(Soviet Union) Kosmos 794 (Strela-1M 108)		Low Earth	Communications	In orbit	Successful
28 January; 10:39	(Soviet Union) Kosmos 795 (Strela-1M 109)		Low Earth	Communications	In orbit	Successful
28 January; 10:39	(Soviet Union) Kosmos 796 (Strela-1M 110)		Low Earth	Communications	In orbit	Successful
28 January; 10:39	(Soviet Union) Kosmos 797 (Strela-1M 111)		Low Earth	Communications	In orbit	Successful
28 January; 10:39	(Soviet Union) Kosmos 798 (Strela-1M 112)		Low Earth	Communications	In orbit	Successful
29 January; 08:30	(Soviet Union) Voskhod		Baikonur Site 31/6			
29 January; 08:30	(Soviet Union) Kosmos 799 (Zenit-2M/Gektor 64)	GRU	Low Earth	Reconnaissance	10 February	Successful
29 January; 23:56	(United States) Atlas-SLV-3D Centaur-D1AR	AC-37	(United States) Cape Canaveral SLC-36B			
29 January; 23:56	(United Nations) Intelsat IVA F-2	Intelsat	Geostationary	Communications	In orbit	Successful
=== February ===
3 February; 08:16	(Soviet Union) Kosmos-3M		(Soviet Union) Plesetsk Site 132/1			
3 February; 08:16	(Soviet Union) Kosmos 800 (Zaliv 20)		Low Earth	Navigation	In orbit	Successful
4 February; 06:00	(Japan) M-3C		Kagoshima Space Center LP-M		ISAS	
4 February; 06:00	Corsa A	ISAS	Low Earth	X-ray astronomy	4 February	Failure
5 February; 14:30	(Soviet Union) Kosmos-2		(Soviet Union) Plesetsk Site 133/1			
5 February; 14:30	(Soviet Union) Kosmos 801 (DS-P1-I 17)		Low Earth	Radar calibration	5 January 1978	Successful
11 February; 08:50	(Soviet Union) Voskhod		(Soviet Union) Baikonur Site 31/6			
11 February; 08:50	(Soviet Union) Kosmos 802 (Zenit-4MK/Germes 55)	GRU	Low Earth	Reconnaissance	25 February	Successful
12 February; 13:00	(Soviet Union) Kosmos-3M		(Soviet Union) Plesetsk Site 132/2			
12 February; 13:00	(Soviet Union) Kosmos 803 (DS-P1-M 8)		Low Earth	ASAT target	In orbit	Successful
12 February; 13:00	Target for Kosmos 804 and 814					
16 February; 08:29	(Soviet Union) Tsyklon-2		(Soviet Union) Baikonur Site 90/20			
16 February; 08:29	(Soviet Union) Kosmos 804 (IS-A 1)		Low Earth	ASAT test	16 February	Successful
19 February; 07:52	(United States) Thor-LV2F Burner-2A		(United States) Vandenberg AFB SLC-10W		(United States) US Air Force	
19 February; 07:52	(United States) DMSP-5C F3 (OPS 5140)	USAF	Sun-synchronous orbit (SSO)	Weather	19 February	Failure
19 February; 07:52	Thor stage not loaded with enough fuel due to typo in engine data sheet. The satellite was placed in much lower orbit and re-entered after one orbit					
19 February; 22:32	(United States) Delta 2914	D-120	(United States) Cape Canaveral SLC-17B			
19 February; 22:32	(United Nations) Marisat-1	Marisat	Geostationary	Communications	In orbit	Successful
20 February; 14:01	(Soviet Union) Soyuz-U		(Soviet Union) Plesetsk Site 43/3			
20 February; 14:01	(Soviet Union) Kosmos 805 (Yantar-2K/Feniks 4)	GRU	Low Earth	Reconnaissance	11 March	Successful
29 February; 03:30:00	(Japan) N-I		(Japan) Tanegashima LA-N		(Japan) ISAS	
29 February; 03:30:00	(Japan) Ionospheric Sounding Satellite (ISS) Ume	ISAS	Low Earth	Ionospheric research	In orbit	Successful
29 February; 03:30:00	First launch completed on February 29					
=== March ===
10 March; 08:00	(Soviet Union) Soyuz-U		(Soviet Union) Baikonur Site 31/6			
10 March; 08:00	(Soviet Union) Kosmos 806 (Zenit-4MK/Germes 56)	GRU	Low Earth	Reconnaissance	23 March	Successful
11 March; 19:45	(Soviet Union) Molniya-M/Blok ML		(Soviet Union) Plesetsk Site 41/1			
11 March; 19:45	(Soviet Union) Molniya-1K 33		Molniya	Communications	10 October 1990	Successful
12 March; 13:30	(Soviet Union) Kosmos-3M		(Soviet Union) Plesetsk Site 132/1			
12 March; 13:30	(Soviet Union) Kosmos 807 (Taifun-1 4)		Low Earth	Radar calibration	In orbit	Successful
15 March; 01:25:40	(United States) Titan III(23)C		(United States) Cape Canaveral SLC-40		(United States) NASA	
15 March; 01:25:40	(United States) LES-8	MIT Lincoln Laboratory	Geostationary	Technology demonstration	In orbit	Successful
15 March; 01:25:40	(United States) LES-9	MIT Lincoln Laboratory	Geostationary	Technology demonstration	In orbit	Successful
15 March; 01:25:40	(United States) SOLRAD 11A	NRL	High Earth orbit	Heliophysics	In orbit	Successful
15 March; 01:25:40	(United States) SOLRAD 11B	NRL	High Earth orbit	Heliophysics	In orbit	Successful
15 March; 01:25:40	LES-8 was decommissioned in 2004; LES-9, the last Lincoln Experimental Satellite, continued functioning for 44 years and was finally decommissioned in 2020.					
16 March; 17:22	(Soviet Union) Vostok-2M		(Soviet Union) Plesetsk Site 41/1			
16 March; 17:22	(Soviet Union) Kosmos 808 (Tselina-D 9)		Low Earth	SIGINT	20 November 1993	Successful
18 March; 09:15	Kosmos 809		Baikonur Site 31/6			
18 March; 09:15	Kosmos 809 (Zenit-2M/Gektor 65)	GRU	Low Earth	Reconnaissance	30 March	Successful
19 March; 19:31	(Soviet Union) Molniya-M/Blok ML		(Soviet Union) Baikonur Site 1/5			
19 March; 19:31	(Soviet Union) Molniya-1K 34		Molniya	Communications	14 May 1985	Successful
22 March; 18:14	(United States) Titan III(24)B		(United States) Vandenberg AFB SLC-4W		(United States) US Air Force	
22 March; 18:14	(United States) KH-8 46 (Gambit-3 46, OPS 7600)	NRO	Low Earth	Reconnaissance	18 May	Successful
26 March; 15:00	(Soviet Union) Voskhod		(Soviet Union) Plesetsk Site 43/3			
26 March; 15:00	(Soviet Union) Kosmos 810 (Zenit-4MK/Germes 57)	GRU	Low Earth	Reconnaissance	8 April	Successful
26 March; 22:47	(United States) Delta 3914	D-121	(United States) Cape Canaveral SLC-17A			
26 March; 22:47	(United States) Satcom 2	RCA Americom	Geostationary	Communications	In orbit	Successful
31 March; 12:50	(Soviet Union) Soyuz-M		(Soviet Union) Plesetsk Site 41/1			
31 March; 12:50	(Soviet Union) Kosmos 811 (Zenit-4MT/Orion 10)	GRU	Low Earth	Reconnaissance	12 April	Successful
=== April ===
6 April; 04:14	(Soviet Union) Kosmos-3M		(Soviet Union) Plesetsk Site 132/1			
6 April; 04:14	(Soviet Union) Kosmos 812 (Tselina-O 31)		Low Earth	SIGINT	30 October 1980	Successful
7 April; 13:05	(Soviet Union) Vostok-2M		(Soviet Union) Plesetsk Site 41/1			
7 April; 13:05	(Soviet Union) Meteor-1 24		Low Earth	Weather	In orbit	Successful
9 April; 08:30	(Soviet Union) Voskhod		(Soviet Union) Plesetsk Site 43/3			
9 April; 08:30	(Soviet Union) Kosmos 813 (Zenit-2M/Gektor 66)	GRU	Low Earth	Reconnaissance	21 April	Successful
13 April; 17:15	(Soviet Union) Tsyklon-2		(Soviet Union) Baikonur Site 90/20			
13 April; 17:15	(Soviet Union) Kosmos 814 (IS-A 2)		Low Earth	ASAT test	13 March	Successful
22 April; 20:46	(United States) Delta 2914	D-122	(United States) Cape Canaveral SLC-17B		(United States) US Air Force	
22 April; 20:46	NATO 3A	NATO	Geostationary	Military communications	In orbit	Successful
28 April; 09:30	(Soviet Union) Voskhod		(Soviet Union) Plesetsk Site 43/3			
28 April; 09:30	(Soviet Union) Kosmos 815 (Zenit-4MK/Germes 58)	GRU	Low Earth	Reconnaissance	11 May	Successful
28 April; 13:30	(Soviet Union) Kosmos-3M		Plesetsk Site 132/1			
28 April; 13:30	(Soviet Union) Kosmos 816 (Taifun-2 1)		Low Earth	Radar calibration	24 November 1979	Successful
28 April; 13:30	(Soviet Union) 24 Romb subsatellites		Low Earth	Radar calibration	1977	Successful
30 April; 19:12	(United States) Atlas F MSD		(United States) Vandenberg AFB SLC-3W			
30 April; 19:12	(United States) MSD 1	US Navy	Low Earth	Satellite deployment	In orbit	Successful
30 April; 19:12	(United States) NOSS 1A	US Navy	Low Earth	Ocean surveillance, ELINT	In orbit	Successful
30 April; 19:12	(United States) NOSS 1B	US Navy	Low Earth	Ocean surveillance, ELINT	In orbit	Successful
30 April; 19:12	(United States) NOSS 1C	US Navy	Low Earth	Ocean surveillance, ELINT	In orbit	Successful
=== May ===
4 May; 08:00	(United States) Delta 2913 / Star-24	D-123	(United States) Vandenberg AFB SLC-2W			
4 May; 08:00	(United States) LAGEOS-1	NASA	Medium Earth orbit	Geodesy	In orbit	Successful
5 May; 07:50	(Soviet Union) Voskhod		(Soviet Union) Baikonur Site 31/6			
5 May; 07:50	(Soviet Union) Kosmos 817 (Zenit-4MK/Germes 59)	GRU	Low Earth	Reconnaissance	18 May	Successful
12 May; 17:57	(Soviet Union) Molniya-M/Blok ML		(Soviet Union) Plesetsk Site 41/1			
12 May; 17:57	(Soviet Union) Molniya-3 16L		Molniya	Communications	4 February 1990	Successful
13 May; 22:28	(United States) Atlas SLV-3D Centaur-D1AR	AC-38	(United States) Cape Canaveral SLC-36A			
13 May; 22:28	(United States) Comstar 1A (D1)	COMSAT	Geostationary	Communications	In orbit	Successful
15 May; 13:30	(Soviet Union) Vostok-2M		(Soviet Union) Plesetsk Site 43/3			
15 May; 13:30	(Soviet Union) Meteor-Priroda 2-1 (Meteor-1 25)		Low Earth	Weather, Earth observation	In orbit	Successful
18 May; 10:59	(Soviet Union) Kosmos-2		(Soviet Union) Plesetsk Site 133/1			
18 May; 10:59	(Soviet Union) Kosmos 818 (DS-P1-Yu 78)		Low Earth	Radar calibration	7 March 1977	Successful
20 May; 09:00	(Soviet Union) Voskhod		(Soviet Union) Baikonur Site 31/6			
20 May; 09:00	(Soviet Union) Kosmos 819 (Zenit-2M/Gektor 67)	GRU	Low Earth	Reconnaissance	1 June	Successful
21 May; 07:00	(Soviet Union) Soyuz-U		(Soviet Union) Plesetsk Site 43/3			
21 May; 07:00	(Soviet Union) Kosmos 820 (Zenit-4MKT/Fram 2)	GRU	Low Earth	Reconnaissance	2 June	Successful
22 May; 07:42	(United States) Scout B-1		(United States) Vandenberg AFB SLC-5		(United States) US Air Force	
22 May; 07:42	(United States) Wideband (P76-5)	STP	Low Earth	Ionosphere research	In orbit	Successful
26 May; 09:00	(Soviet Union) Voskhod		(Soviet Union) Plesetsk Site 43/3			
26 May; 09:00	(Soviet Union) Kosmos 821 (Zenit-4MK/Germes 60)	GRU	Low Earth	Reconnaissance	8 June	Successful
28 May; 15:00	(Soviet Union) Kosmos-3M		(Soviet Union) Plesetsk Site 132/1			
28 May; 15:00	(Soviet Union) Kosmos 822 (Taifun-1/Vektor 5)		Low Earth	Radar calibration	8 August 1978	Successful
=== June ===
2 June; 20:56	(United States) Titan III(34)B		(United States) Vandenberg AFB SLC-4W			
2 June; 20:56	(United States) Quasar 1 (SDS 1, OPS 7837)	NRO	Highly elliptical	Data relay	In orbit	Successful
2 June; 22:30	(Soviet Union) Kosmos-3M		(Soviet Union) Plesetsk Site 132/2			
2 June; 22:30	(Soviet Union) Kosmos 823 (Zaliv 21)		Low Earth	Navigation	In orbit	Successful
8 June; 07:00	(Soviet Union) Voskhod		(Soviet Union) Baikonur Site 31/6			
8 June; 07:00	(Soviet Union) Kosmos 824 (Zenit-4MK/Germes 61)	GRU	Low Earth	Reconnaissance	21 June	Successful
10 June; 00:09	(United States) Delta 2914	D-124	(United States) Cape Canaveral SLC-17A			
10 June; 00:09	(United Nations) Marisat 2	Marisat	Geostationary	Communications	In orbit	Successful
	(Soviet Union) Kosmos-3M		(Soviet Union) Plesetsk Site 132/2			
	(Soviet Union) Kosmos 825 (Strela-1M 113)		Low Earth	Communications	In orbit	Successful
	(Soviet Union) Kosmos 826 (Strela-1M 114)		Low Earth	Communications	In orbit	Successful
	(Soviet Union) Kosmos 827 (Strela-1M 115)		Low Earth	Communications	In orbit	Successful
	(Soviet Union) Kosmos 828 (Strela-1M 116)		Low Earth	Communications	In orbit	Successful
	(Soviet Union) Kosmos 829 (Strela-1M 117)		Low Earth	Communications	In orbit	Successful
	(Soviet Union) Kosmos 830 (Strela-1M 118)		Low Earth	Communications	In orbit	Successful
	(Soviet Union) Kosmos 831 (Strela-1M 119)		Low Earth	Communications	In orbit	Successful
	(Soviet Union) Kosmos 832 (Strela-1M 120)		Low Earth	Communications	In orbit	Successful
16 June; 13:09	(Soviet Union) Voskhod		(Soviet Union) Plesetsk Site 43/3			
16 June; 13:09	(Soviet Union) Kosmos 833 (Zenit-4MK/Germes 62)	GRU	Low Earth	Reconnaissance	29 June	Successful
19 June; 16:00	(Soviet Union) Kosmos-3M		(Soviet Union) Plesetsk Site 132/1			
19 June; 16:00	(United Nations) Interkosmos 15 (AUOS-Z-T-IK 1)	Interkosmos	Low Earth	Test spacecraft	18 November 1979	Successful
19 June; 16:00	Cooperative project of Czechoslovakia, the GDR, Hungary, Poland and the USSR					
22 June; 18:04:00	(Soviet Union) Proton-K		(Soviet Union) Baikonur Site 81/23		(Soviet Union)	
22 June; 18:04:00	(Soviet Union) Salyut 5 (Almaz OPS-3)		Low Earth	Space station	8 August 1977	Successful
22 June; 18:04:00	Visited by three crews, one of which failed to dock					
24 June; 07:10	(Soviet Union) Soyuz-U		(Soviet Union) Plesetsk Site 43/3			
24 June; 07:10	(Soviet Union) Kosmos 834 (Zenit-2M/Gektor 68)	GRU	Low Earth	Reconnaissance	6 July	Successful
26 June; 03:00	(United States) Titan III(23)C		(United States) Cape Canaveral SLC-40			
26 June; 03:00	(United States) DSP 6 (OPS 2112)	USAF	Geostationary	Missile early warning	In orbit	Successful
29 June; 07:20	(Soviet Union) Voskhod		(Soviet Union) Baikonur Site 31/6			
29 June; 07:20	(Soviet Union) Kosmos 835 (Zenit-4MK/Germes 63)	GRU	Low Earth	Reconnaissance	12 July	Successful
29 June; 07:20	Final flight of the Voskhod					
29 June; 08:12	(Soviet Union) Kosmos-3M		(Soviet Union) Plesetsk Site 132/2			
29 June; 08:12	(Soviet Union) Kosmos 836 (Strela-2M 12)		Low Earth	Communications	In orbit	Successful
=== July ===
1 July; 08:05	(Soviet Union) Molniya-M/Blok ML		(Soviet Union) Plesetsk Site 43/4			
1 July; 08:05	(Soviet Union) Kosmos 837 (Molniya-2)		Molniya (planned); Low Earth (achieved)	Communications	18 November 1983	Partial failure
1 July; 08:05	Malfunction of Blok ML upper stage, the satellite placed in the much lower orbit					
2 July; 10:30	(Soviet Union) Tsyklon-2		(Soviet Union) Baikonur Site 90/19			
2 July; 10:30	(Soviet Union) Kosmos 838 (US-P 3)		Low Earth	Ocean surveillance, ELINT	23 August 1977	Successful
6 July; 12:08:45	(Soviet Union) Soyuz		(Soviet Union) Baikonur Site 1/5		(Soviet Union)	
6 July; 12:08:45	(Soviet Union) Soyuz 21		Low Earth (Salyut 5)	Salyut expedition	24 August; 18:32:17	Partial mission failure
6 July; 12:08:45	Crewed flight with two cosmonauts, final flight of Soyuz 11A511, returned early due to crew illness					
8 July; 18:30	(United States) Titan IIID		(United States) Vandenberg AFB SLC-4E			
8 July; 18:30	(United States) KH-9 12 (Hexagon, OPS 4699)	NRO	Low Earth	Reconnaissance	13 December	Successful
8 July; 18:30	(United States) Ursala 3 (P-11 4430, OPS 5366)		Low Earth	ELINT, SIGINT	In orbit	Successful
8 July; 18:30	(United States) S3 3 (S74-2, OPS 3986)	STP	Highly elliptical	Magnetosphere research	24 April 1986	Successful
8 July; 18:30	Ursala was deployed from KH-9					
8 July; 21:08	(Soviet Union) Kosmos-3M		(Soviet Union) Plesetsk Site 132/1			
8 July; 21:08	(Soviet Union) Kosmos 839 (DS-P1-M 9)		Low Earth	ASAT target	In orbit	Successful
8 July; 21:08	Target for Kosmos 843					
8 July; 23:31	(United States) Delta 2914	D-125	(United States) Cape Canaveral SLC-17A			
8 July; 23:31	(Indonesia) Palapa A1	Perumtel	Geostationary	Communications	In orbit	Successful
8 July; 23:31	First Indonesian satellite					
14 July; 09:00	(Soviet Union) Soyuz-U		(Soviet Union) Plesetsk Site 43/4			
14 July; 09:00	(Soviet Union) Kosmos 840 (Zenit-2M/Gektor 69)	GRU	Low Earth	Reconnaissance	26 July	Successful
15 July; 13:11	(Soviet Union) Kosmos-3M		(Soviet Union) Plesetsk Site 132/1			
15 July; 13:11	(Soviet Union) Kosmos 841 (Strela-2M 13)		Low Earth	Communications	In orbit	Successful
21 July; 10:20	(Soviet Union) Kosmos-3M		(Soviet Union) Plesetsk 132/1			
21 July; 10:20	(Soviet Union) Kosmos 842 (Sfera 15)		Low Earth	Geodesy	In orbit	Successful
21 July; 15:14	(Soviet Union) Tsyklon-2		(Soviet Union) Baikonur Site 90/19			
21 July; 15:14	(Soviet Union) Kosmos 843 (IS-A 3)		Low Earth	ASAT test	22 July	Successful
22 July; 15:40	(Soviet Union) Soyuz-U		(Soviet Union)			
22 July; 15:40	(Soviet Union) Kosmos 844 (Yantar-2K/Feniks 5)	GRU	Low Earth	Reconnaissance	30 August	Successful
22 July; 22:04	(United States) Atlas SLV-3D Centaur-D1AR	AC-40	(United States) Cape Canaveral SLC-36B			
22 July; 22:04	(United States) Comstar 1B (D2)	COMSAT	Geostationary	Communications	In orbit	Successful
23 July; 15:49	(Soviet Union) Molniya-M/Blok ML		(Soviet Union) Baikonur Site 1/5			
23 July; 15:49	(Soviet Union) Molniya-1K 35		Molniya	Communications	30 May 1987	Successful
27 July; 05:21	(Soviet Union) Kosmos-3M		(Soviet Union) Plesetsk Site 132/1			
27 July; 05:21	(Soviet Union) Kosmos 845 (Tselina-O 32)		Low Earth	SIGINT	15 November 1980	Successful
27 July; 12:00	(Soviet Union) Kosmos-3M		(Soviet Union) Kapustin Yar Site 107/2			
27 July; 12:00	(United Nations) Interkosmos 16 (DS-U3-IK 6)	Interkosmos	Low Earth	Aeronomy, solar research	10 July 1979	Successful
27 July; 12:00	Cooperative project of Czechoslovakia, the GDR, Sweden and the USSR					
29 July; 17:07	(United States) Delta 2310	D-126	(United States) Vendenberg AFB SLC-2W			
29 July; 17:07	(United States) NOAA-5 (ITOS-H)	NOAA	SSO	Weather	In orbit	Successful
29 July; 20:02	(Soviet Union) Kosmos-3M		(Soviet Union) Plesetsk Site 132/1			
29 July; 20:02	(Soviet Union) Kosmos 846 (Zaliv 22)		Low Earth	Navigation	In orbit	Successful
=== August ===
4 August; 13:40	(Soviet Union) Soyuz-U		(Soviet Union) Plesetsk Sie 43/4			
4 August; 13:40	(Soviet Union) Kosmos 847 (Zenit-4MK/Germes 64)	GRU	Low Earth	Reconnaissance	17 August	Successful
6 August; 22:21	(United States) Titan III(34)B		(United States) Vandenberg AFB SLC-4W			
6 August; 22:21	(United States) Quasar 2 (SDS 2, OPS 7940)	NRO	Highly elliptic	Data relay	18 April 2020	Successful
9 August; 12:08:45	(Soviet Union) Proton-K/D		(Soviet Union) Baikonur 81/23			
9 August; 12:08:45	(Soviet Union) Luna 24		Selenocentric	Lunar lander	22 August	Successful
9 August; 12:08:45	Third uncrewed lunar sample return, Third Soviet lunar sample return					
12 August; 13:30	(Soviet Union) Soyuz-U		(Soviet Union) Plesetsk Site 43/3			
12 August; 13:30	(Soviet Union) Kosmos 848 (Zenit-2M/Gektor #70)	GRU	Low Earth	Reconnaissance	25 August	Successful
12 August; 13:30	(Soviet Union) Nauka-19KS 1L		Low Earth	Research	25 August	Successful
18 August; 09:30	(Soviet Union) Kosmos-2		(Soviet Union) Plesetsk Site 133/1			
18 August; 09:30	(Soviet Union) Kosmos 849 (DS-P1-I 18)		Low Earth	Radar calibration	24 April 1978	Successful
26 August; 10:59	(Soviet Union) Kosmos-2		(Soviet Union) Plesetsk Site 133/1			
26 August; 10:59	(Soviet Union) Kosmos 850 (DS-P1-Yu 79)		Low Earth	Radar calibration	16 May 1977	Successful
27 August; 14:34	(Soviet Union) Vostok-2M		(Soviet Union) Plesetsk Site 43/4			
27 August; 14:34	(Soviet Union) Kosmos 851 (Tselina-D 10)		Low Earth	SIGINT	5 August 1989	Successful
28 August; 09:00	(Soviet Union) Soyuz-U		(Soviet Union) Baikonur Site 31/6			
28 August; 09:00	(Soviet Union) Kosmos 852 (Zenit-4MK/Germes 65)	GRU	Low Earth	Reconnaissance	10 September	Successful
30 August; 11:45	(China) Feng Bao 1		(China) Jiuquan LA-2B (Site 138)			
30 August; 11:45	(China) JSSW-3 (CK 3)		Elliptical low Earth orbit	Unknown	25 November 1978	Successful
30 August; 11:45	Apogee much higher than intended.					
=== September ===
1 September; 03:23	(Soviet Union) Molniya-M/Blok ML		(Soviet Union) Plesetsk Site 43/3			
1 September; 03:23	(Soviet Union) Kosmos 853 (Molniya-2)		Molniya (intended); Low Earth (achieved)	Communications	31 December	Partial failure
1 September; 03:23	Malfunction of the Blok ML upper stage, the satellite placed to the much lower orbit					
1 September; 21:14	(United States) Scout D-1		(United States) Veandenberg AFB SLC-5		(United States) US Air Force	
1 September; 21:14	(United States) Triad 3 (TIP 3)	US Navy	Low Earth	Navigation	30 May 1981	Successful
3 September; 09:20	(Soviet Union) Soyuz-U		(Soviet Union) Plesetsk Site 43/4			
3 September; 09:20	(Soviet Union) Kosmos 854 (Zenit-4MK/Germes 66)	GRU	Low Earth	Reconnaissance	16 September	Successful
11 September; 08:00	(United States) Thor-LV2F Star-37XE Star-37S-ISS		(United States) Vandenberg AFB SLC-10W		(United States) US Air Force	
11 September; 08:00	(United States) DMSP-5D1 F1 (OPS 5721)	USAF	SSO	Weather	In orbit	Successful
11 September; 18:24	(Soviet Union) Proton-K/Blok DM		(Soviet Union) Baikonur Site 81/24			
11 September; 18:24	(Soviet Union) Raduga 2 (Gran 12L)		Geostationary	Communications	In orbit	Successful
15 September; 09:48:30	(Soviet Union) Soyuz-U		(Soviet Union) Baikonur Site 1/5		(Soviet Union)	
15 September; 09:48:30	(Soviet Union) Soyuz 22		Low Earth	Salyut expedition	23 September; 07:40:47	Successful
15 September; 09:48:30	Crewed flight with two cosmonauts					
15 September; 18:50	(United States) Titan III(24)B		(United States) Vandenberg AFB SLC-4W		(United States) US Air Force	
15 September; 18:50	(United States) KH-8 47 (Gambit-3, OPS 8533)	NRO	Low Earth	Reconnaissance	5 November	Successful
21 September; 11:40	(Soviet Union) Soyuz-U		(Soviet Union) Plesetsk Site 43/3			
21 September; 11:40	(Soviet Union) Kosmos 855 (Zenit-4MT/Orion 11)	GRU	Low Earth	Reconnaissance	3 October	Successful
22 September; 09:30	(Soviet Union) Soyuz-U		(Soviet Union) Baikonur Site 31/6			
22 September; 09:30	(Soviet Union) Kosmos 856 (Zenit-2M/Gektor 71) & Nauka	GRU	Low Earth	Reconnaissance	5 October	Successful
22 September; 09:30	(Soviet Union) Nauka		Low Earth	Research		
24 September; 15:00	(Soviet Union) Soyuz-U		(Soviet Union) Plesetsk Site 43/3			
24 September; 15:00	(Soviet Union) Kosmos 857 (Zenit-4MK/Germes 67)	GRU	Low Earth	Reconnaissance	7 November	Successful
29 September; 07:04	(Soviet Union) Kosmos-3M		(Soviet Union) Plesetsk Site 132/2			
29 September; 07:04	(Soviet Union) Kosmos 858 (Strela-2M 14)		Low Earth	Communications	In orbit	Successful
=== October ===
4 October; 11:00	(Soviet Union) Soyuz-U		(Soviet Union) Plesetsk Site 43/4			
4 October; 11:00	(Soviet Union) Zenit-4MKT/Fram 3	GRU	Low Earth	Reconnaissance	4 October	Failure
4 October; 11:00	One of liquid rocket boosters prematurely detached from the core stage, the launch vehicle lost stability. Thrust termination command was issued at T+94 s					
10 October; 09:35	(Soviet Union) Soyuz-U		(Soviet Union) Baikonur Site 31/6			
10 October; 09:35	(Soviet Union) Kosmos 859 (Zenit-4MK/Germes 68)	GRU	Low Earth	Reconnaissance	21 October	Successful
14 October; 17:39:18	(Soviet Union) Soyuz-U		(Soviet Union) Baikonur Site 1/5		(Soviet Union)	
14 October; 17:39:18	(Soviet Union) Soyuz 23		Low Earth (Intended: Salyut 5)	Salyut expedition	16 October; 17:45:53	Spacecraft failure
14 October; 17:39:18	Crewed flight with two cosmonauts, failed to dock with Salyut 5					
14 October; 22:44	(United States) Delta 2914	D-	(United States) Cape Canaveral SLC-17A			
14 October; 22:44	(United Nations) Marisat 3	Marisat	Geostationary	Communications	In orbit	Successful
15 October; 22:59	(Soviet Union) Vostok-2M		(Soviet Union) Plesetsk Site 43/3			
15 October; 22:59	(Soviet Union) Meteor-1 26		Low Earth	Weather	In orbit	Successful
17 October; 18:06	(Soviet Union) Tsyklon-2		(Soviet Union) Baikonur Site 90/19			
17 October; 18:06	(Soviet Union) Kosmos 860 (US-A 12)		Low Earth	Radar ocean surveillance	In orbit	Successful
21 October; 16:53	(Soviet Union) Tsyklon-2		(Soviet Union) Baikonur Site 90/19			
21 October; 16:53	(Soviet Union) Kosmos 861 (US-A 13)		Low Earth	Radar ocean surveillance	In orbit	Successful
22 October; 09:11	(Soviet Union) Molniya-M/Blok 2BL		(Soviet Union) Plesetsk Site 43/4			
22 October; 09:11	(Soviet Union) Kosmos 862 (US-K 5)		Molniya	Missile early warning	In orbit	Successful
25 October; 14:30	(Soviet Union) Soyuz-U		(Soviet Union) Plesetsk Site 43/4			
25 October; 14:30	(Soviet Union) Kosmos 863 (Zenit-4MK/Germes 69)	GRU	Low Earth	Reconnaissance	5 November	Successful
26 October; 14:50	(Soviet Union) Proton-K/Blok DM		(Soviet Union) Baikonur Site 81/24			
26 October; 14:50	(Soviet Union) Ekran 1 (Ekran 11L)		Geostationary	Communications	In orbit	Successful
29 October; 12:39	(Soviet Union) Kosmos-3M		(Soviet Union) Plesetsk Site 132/2			
29 October; 12:39	(Soviet Union) Kosmos 864 (Parus 6)		Low Earth	Navigation	In orbit	Successful
=== November ===
1 November; 11:20	(Soviet Union) Soyuz-U		(Soviet Union) Plesetsk Site 43/4			
1 November; 11:20	(Soviet Union) Kosmos 865 (Zenit-2M/Gektor 72)	GRU	Low Earth	Reconnaissance	13 November	Successful
10 November; 09:05	(China) Feng Bao 1		(China) Jiuquan LA-2B (Site 138)			
10 November; 09:05	(China) JSSW		Low Earth	Unknown	10 November	Failure
10 November; 09:05	Engine on the second stage malfunctioned, reducing thrust.					
11 November; 10:45	(Soviet Union) Soyuz-U		(Soviet Union) Baikonur Site 31/6			
11 November; 10:45	(Soviet Union) Kosmos 866 (Zenit-4MK/Germes 70)	GRU	Low Earth	Reconnaissance	23 November	Successful
23 November; 16:27	(Soviet Union) Soyuz-U		(Soviet Union) Plesetsk Site 43/4			
23 November; 16:27	(Soviet Union) Kosmos 867 (Zenit-6U/Argon 1)	GRU	Low Earth	Reconnaissance	6 December	Successful
25 November; 03:59	(Soviet Union) Molniya-M/Blok SO-L		(Soviet Union) Baikonur Site 31/6			
25 November; 03:59	(Soviet Union) Prognoz 5		Highly elliptical	Magnetoshpere and solar research	12 July 1979	Successful
26 November; 14:30	(Soviet Union) Tsyklon-2		(Soviet Union) Baikonur Site 90/20			
26 November; 14:30	(Soviet Union) Kosmos 868 (US-P 4)		Low Earth	Ocean surveillance, ELINT	8 July 1978	Successful
29 November; 16:04	(Soviet Union) Soyuz-U		(Soviet Union) Baikonur Site 1/5			
29 November; 16:04	(Soviet Union) Kosmos 869 (Soyuz-T Test 3)		Low Earth	Uncrewed test of Soyuz-T spacecraft	17 December; 10:31	Successful
=== December ===
2 December; 00:17	(Soviet Union) Kosmos-3M		(Soviet Union) Plesetsk Site 132/2			
2 December; 00:17	(Soviet Union) Kosmos 870 (Tselina-O 33)		Low Earth	SIGINT	20 December 1980	Successful
2 December; 02:44	(Soviet Union) Molniya-M/Blok ML		(Soviet Union) Plesetsk Site 43/4			
2 December; 02:44	(Soviet Union) Molniya-2 16		Molniya	Communications	18 January 1991	Successful
7 December; 04:38	(China) Long March 2A		(China) Jiquan LA-2B (Site 138)			
7 December; 04:38	(China) FSW-0 2		Low Earth	Reconnaissance	2 December	Successful
7 December; 04:38	Re-entry capsule recovered on 9 December					
7 December; 10:23	(Soviet Union) Kosmos-3M		(Soviet Union) Plesetsk Site 132/1			
7 December; 10:23	(Soviet Union) Kosmos 871 (Strela-1M 121)		Low Earth	Communications	In orbit	Successful
7 December; 10:23	(Soviet Union) Kosmos 872 (Strela-1M 122)		Low Earth	Communications	In orbit	Successful
7 December; 10:23	(Soviet Union) Kosmos 873 (Strela-1M 123)		Low Earth	Communications	In orbit	Successful
7 December; 10:23	(Soviet Union) Kosmos 874 (Strela-1M 124)		Low Earth	Communications	In orbit	Successful
7 December; 10:23	(Soviet Union) Kosmos 875 (Strela-1M 125)		Low Earth	Communications	In orbit	Successful
7 December; 10:23	(Soviet Union) Kosmos 876 (Strela-1M 126)		Low Earth	Communications	In orbit	Successful
7 December; 10:23	(Soviet Union) Kosmos 877 (Strela-1M 127)		Low Earth	Communications	In orbit	Successful
7 December; 10:23	(Soviet Union) Kosmos 878 (Strela-1M 128)		Low Earth	Communications	In orbit	Successful
9 December; 10:00	(Soviet Union) Soyuz-U		(Soviet Union) Plesetsk Site 43/4			
9 December; 10:00	(Soviet Union) Kosmos 879 (Zenit-2M/Gektor 73)	GRU	Low Earth	Reconnaissance	22 December	Successful
9 December; 20:00	(Soviet Union) Kosmos-3M		(Soviet Union) Plesetsk Site 132/2			
9 December; 20:00	(Soviet Union) Kosmos 880 (DS-P1-M 10)		Low Earth	ASAT target	31 August 1991	Successful
9 December; 20:00	Target for Kosmos 886					
15 December; 01:30	(Soviet Union) Proton-K		(Soviet Union) Baikonur Site 81/24			
15 December; 01:30	(Soviet Union) Kosmos 881 (TKS-VA 1)		Low Earth	Uncrewed test of TKS-VA spacecraft	15 December	Successful
15 December; 01:30	(Soviet Union) Kosmos 882 (TKS-VA 2)		Low Earth	Uncrewed test of TKS-VA spacecraft	15 December	Successful
15 December; 01:30	Test flight of two VA capsules without FGB service modules					
15 December; 13:59	(Soviet Union) Kosmos-3M		(Soviet Union) Plesetsk Site 132/1			
15 December; 13:59	(Soviet Union) Kosmos 883 (Tsikada 1)		Low Earth	Navigation	In orbit	Successful
17 December; 09:30	(Soviet Union) Soyuz-U		(Soviet Union) Baikonur Site 31/6			
17 December; 09:30	(Soviet Union) Kosmos 884 (Zenit-4MK/Germes 71)	GRU	Low Earth	Reconnaissance	29 December	Successful
17 December; 12:00	(Soviet Union) Kosmos-3M		(Soviet Union) Plesetsk Site 132/2			
17 December; 12:00	(Soviet Union) Kosmos 885 (Taifun-2 2)		Low Earth	Radar calibration	14 October 1979	Successful
17 December; 12:00	(Soviet Union) 17 Romb subsatellites		Low Earth	Radar calibration	1977-1978	Successful
19 December; 18:19	(United States) Titan IIID		(United States) Vandenberg SLC-4E		(United States) US Air Force	
19 December; 18:19	(United States) KH-11 1 (Kennen, OPS 5705)	NRO	Low Earth	Reconnaissance	28 January 1979	Successful
27 December; 12:05	(Soviet Union) Tsyklon-2		(Soviet Union) Baikonur Site 90/19			
27 December; 12:05	(Soviet Union) Kosmos 886 (IS-A 4)		Low Earth	ASAT test	In orbit	Successful
28 December; 06:38	(Soviet Union) Molniya-M/Blok BL		(Soviet Union) Plesetsk Site 43/4			
28 December; 06:38	(Soviet Union) Molniya-3 17L		Molniya	Communications	19 March 1990	Successful
28 December; 07:49	(Soviet Union) Kosmos-3M		(Soviet Union) Plesetsk Site 132/1			
28 December; 07:49	(Soviet Union) Kosmos 887 (Parus 7)		Low Earth	Navigation	In orbit	Successful

== Launches from the Moon ==
Date and time (UTC)	Rocket	Flight number	Launch site		LSP	
Date and time (UTC)	Payload (⚀ = CubeSat)	Operator	Orbit	Function	Decay (UTC)	Outcome
Date and time (UTC)	Remarks					
19 August; 5:25	(Soviet Union) Luna 24 Ascent stage		Mare Crisium (Luna)			
19 August; 5:25	(Soviet Union) Luna 24 Return capsule	(Soviet Union)	Highly elliptical	Sample return	22 August 1976	Successful
19 August; 5:25	Third uncrewed lunar sample return mission					

== Deep space rendezvous ==
Date	Spacecraft	Event	Remarks
19 June	Viking 1	Areocentric orbit insertion	
20 July	Viking 1 Lander	landed in Chryse Planitia	
7 August	Viking 2	Areocentric orbit insertion	
18 August	Luna 24	landed in Mare Crisium	sample return mission
19 August	Luna 24	lift-off from Mare Crisium	170 grams (6.0 oz)
3 September	Viking 2 Lander	landed in Utopia Planitia	
