= Ginga (satellite) =

Japanese X-ray astronomy satellite

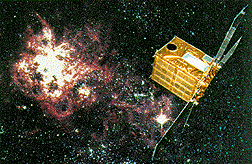
- Names: Astro-C before launch
- Mission type: X-ray Astronomy
- Operator: Institute of Space and Astronautical Science; University of Tokyo
- COSPAR ID: 1987-012A
- SATCAT no.: 17480

Spacecraft properties
- Launch mass: 400 kg (880 lb)

Start of mission
- Launch date: 06:28, February 5, 1987 (UTC)
- Rocket: M-3S2, mission M-3S2-3
- Launch site: Uchinoura Space Center

End of mission
- Decay date: November 1, 1991

Orbital parameters
- Reference system: Geocentric
- Eccentricity: 0.01365
- Perigee altitude: 517 km (321 mi)
- Apogee altitude: 708 km (440 mi)
- Inclination: 31.1°
- Period: 97 min
- Epoch: February 5, 1987

Ginga (Japanese for 'galaxy', formerly ASTRO-C), was an X-ray astronomy satellite launched from the Kagoshima Space Center on 5 February 1987 using M-3SII launch vehicle. The primary instrument for observations was the Large Area Counter (LAC). Ginga was the third Japanese X-ray astronomy mission, following Hakucho and Tenma (also Hinotori satellite - which preceded Ginga - had X-ray sensors, but it can be seen as a heliophysics rather than X-ray astronomy mission). Ginga reentered the Earth's atmosphere on 1 November 1991.

== Instruments ==
- Large Area Proportional Counter (LAC 1.5-37 keV)
- All-Sky Monitor (ASM 1-20 keV)
- Gamma-ray Burst Detector (GBD 1.5-500 keV)

== Highlights ==
- Discovery of transient Black Hole Candidates and study of their spectral evolution.
- Discovery of weak transients in the galactic ridge.
- Detection of cyclotron features in 3 X-ray pulsars: 4U1538-522, V0332+53, and Cep X-4.
- Evidence for emission and absorption Fe feature in Seyfert probing reprocessing by cold matter.
- Discovery of intense 6-7 keV iron line emission from the Galactic Center region.
