= Tansei =

Tansei (Japanese: たんせい) also designated MS-T1 (Mother Satellite Test-1), was a Japanese artificial satellite developed by the Institute of Space and Astronautical Science at the University of Tokyo. Launched on 16 February 1971 aboard an M-4S rocket, it was designed to test the launch vehicle's performance, study the space environment and verify onboard systems. Weighing 63 kg, the satellite was built in a 26-faced spherical form and carried telemetry, command and data-recording equipment. It was the first of four satellites launched under the Tansei name between 1971 and 1980.

== Design ==
Tansei, also designated MS-T1 (Mother Satellite Test-1), was launched at 13:00 JST on 16 February 1971 from the Kagoshima Space Center (Uchinoura) on an M-4S rocket. Its objectives were to verify the performance of the M-4S rocket and, once in orbit, to study the space environment and test the satellite's own performance. The satellite weighed 63 kg and was a 26-faced polyhedron approximating a sphere 75 cm in diameter. It carried a telemetry transmitter, a command receiver and decoder, and a magnetic-tape data recorder, and it was powered by a silver oxide–zinc battery. Its orbit had a perigee of about 990 km, an apogee of about 1,100 km and an inclination of 30°.

The M-4S was a four-stage solid-fuel rocket with eight SB-310 strap-on boosters and M-10, M-20, M-30 and M-40 stages. Tansei's flight was its second, after a September 1970 launch failed when the fourth stage did not ignite. The later Tansei satellites flew on different rockets: Tansei 2 on an M-3C-1 in February 1974, Tansei 3 on an M-3H-1 in February 1977 and Tansei 4 on an M-3S-1 in February 1980.
