= Denpa (satellite) =

Failed Japanese scientific research satellite

- Operator: Institute of Space and Astronautical Science
- COSPAR ID: 1972-064A
- SATCAT no.: 06152

Start of mission
- Launch date: 19 August 1972, 02:40 UTC
- Rocket: M-4S
- Launch site: Kagoshima Space Center, LP-M

End of mission
- Decay date: 19 May 1980

Denpa (電波, denpa; literally, "electromagnetic wave"), also known as REXS (Radiation EXperiments Satellite), was a Japanese satellite. The launch was a project of the Institute of Space and Astronautical Science of the University of Tokyo. The satellite was launched on February 19, 1972. Its objective was to conduct measurements in the magnetosphere. It failed shortly after launch; a later report concluded that the transmitter failed due to a high voltage arc.

== See also ==
- Japan Aerospace Exploration Agency (JAXA), Denpa (REXS) mission profile
