= Akebono (satellite) =

Japanese satellite

- Names: EXOS-D
- Mission type: Earth observation
- Operator: ISAS · University of Tokyo
- COSPAR ID: 1989-016A
- SATCAT no.: 19822
- Mission duration: Final: 26 years, 2 months, 1 day

Spacecraft properties
- Launch mass: 294 kg (648 lb)

Start of mission
- Launch date: 21 February 1989, 23:30 UTC
- Rocket: M-3SII, mission M-3SII-1
- Launch site: Uchinoura Space Center, Japan

End of mission
- Disposal: Decommissioned
- Deactivated: 23 April 2015
- Decay date: 26 November 2024

Orbital parameters
- Reference system: Geocentric
- Regime: Low Earth
- Eccentricity: 0.36552
- Perigee altitude: 300 km (190 mi)
- Apogee altitude: 8,000 km (5,000 mi)
- Inclination: 75°
- Epoch: 20 February 1989, 19:00 UTC
Instruments
- EFD: Electric Field Detectors
- MGF: Magnetic Field Detector
- VLF: Very Low Frequency Wave Detectors
- PWS: Stimulated Plasma Wave and High Frequency Plasma Wave Detectors
- LEP: Low Energy Particle Detectors
- SMS: Suprathermal Ion Mass Spectrometer
- TED: Velocity Distribution of Thermal Electrons
- ATV: Visible and UV Auroral Television

Akebono, also known as EXOS-D, was a Japanese scientific satellite developed by the Institute of Space and Astronautical Science to investigate Earth's magnetosphere and auroral phenomena. Launched on 21 February 1989, it carried eight instruments that studied auroral emissions, charged particles, plasma waves and magnetic-field variations. Its observations also examined particle acceleration in the polar ionosphere, the Van Allen radiation belts and changes in the plasmasphere during geomagnetic storms. Although designed for a one-year mission, Akebono operated for more than 26 years before its mission ended on 23 April 2015.

== Description ==
Akebono, also known as EXOS-D, was a Japanese satellite developed by the Institute of Space and Astronautical Science to study auroras and Earth's magnetosphere. Launched aboard an M-3SII rocket on 21 February 1989, it conducted observations for more than 26 years. Its mission ended on 23 April 2015 because of the degradation of its solar cells and the decay of its orbit.

== Development ==
Akebono was designed for a target life of one year but operated for more than 26. Its aim was to study how auroral particles are accelerated above the auroral region and how this relates to substorms. Its results included a demonstration of particle acceleration by electric fields parallel to magnetic field lines and quantitative measurements of ions flowing out of the polar ionosphere, including molecular NO+ and N2+ ions in the high-altitude auroral ionosphere.

Its suprathermal mass spectrometer also observed the polar wind. The plasma wave instrument discovered plasma turbulence at high altitude near the equator and found auroral kilometric radiation in regions associated with auroral particle acceleration. Later observations revealed the thermal structure of the low-altitude plasmasphere and a partial drop in plasmasphere density during magnetic storms, and the radiation and plasma monitors recorded long-term changes in the Van Allen radiation belt linked to solar activity.

Akebono carried eight scientific instruments to investigate Earth's magnetosphere, auroral emissions and charged particles. Its observations contributed to research on plasma waves, magnetic-field variations and particle acceleration in the polar ionosphere.

== See also ==
- International Solar-Terrestrial Physics Science Initiative
