= Solar Radiation and Thermospheric Satellite =

Taiyo
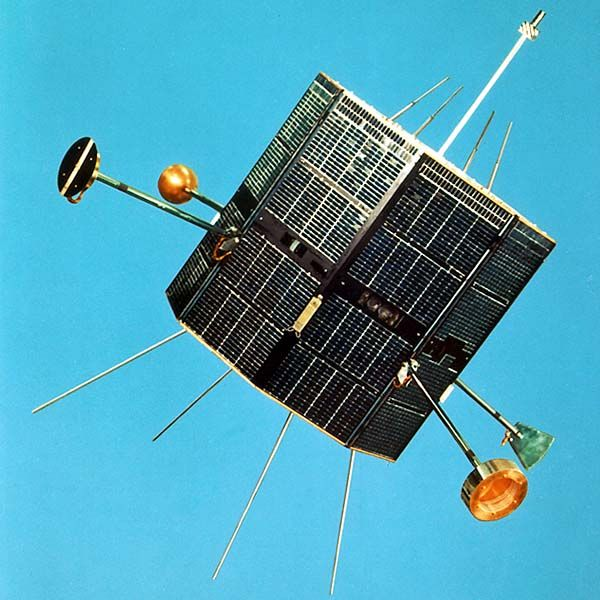
- Mission type: Solar-terrestrial research
- Operator: ISAS
- COSPAR ID: 1975-014A
- SATCAT no.: 7671

Spacecraft properties
- Manufacturer: Nippon Electric Company
- Launch mass: 86 kg
- Dimensions: 0.75 m × 0.65 m (diameter × height)
- Power: 15 watts

Expedition
- Ended: June 29, 1980

Start of mission
- Launch date: February 24, 1975, 05:25 UTC
- Rocket: M-3C No. 2
- Launch site: Kagoshima Space Center

Orbital parameters
- Reference system: Geocentric
- Regime: Low Earth/Medium Earth
- Periapsis altitude: 260 km
- Apoapsis altitude: 3,140 km
- Inclination: 31.54°
- Period: 120 minutes

Solar Radiation and Thermospheric Satellite (SRATS), also known as Taiyo ("Sun" in Japanese) or Shinsei-3, was a space probe developed by the Institute of Space and Astronautical Science (ISAS) at the University of Tokyo. The probe was launched on February 24, 1975, from Kagoshima Space Center by M-3C-2 rocket. Its mission was focused on upper atmospheric physics, X-ray and UV solar radiation, and the Earth's ionosphere. Taiyo completed its mission before re-entering Earth's atmosphere on June 29, 1980.

The satellite had a shape of octagonal cylinder (or prism), weighing 86 kg. It orbited the Earth in an elliptical orbit with a periapsis of 260 km and an apoapsis of 3,140 km, at a 32-degree inclination. The satellite's primary goal was to investigate solar X-rays, ultraviolet radiation, and the distribution of ions and electrons in the Earth's upper atmosphere.

== Instruments ==
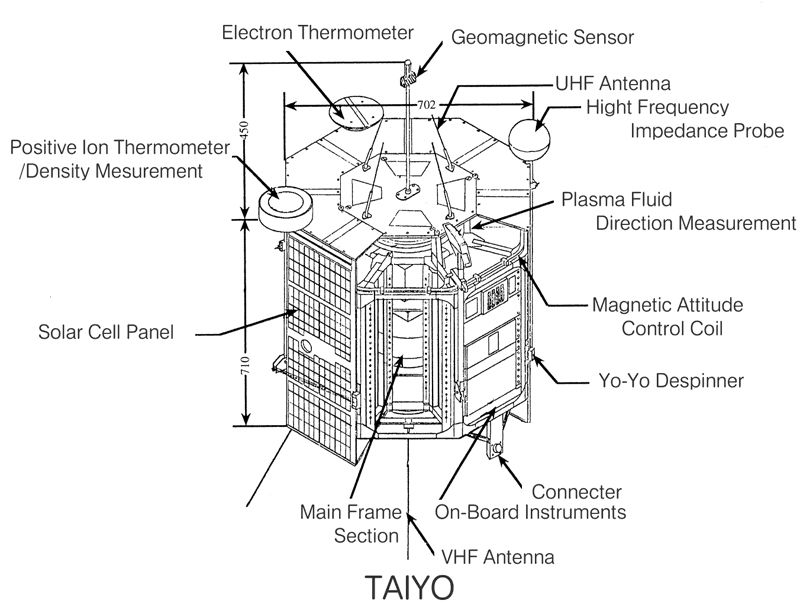
Taiyo instruments

Taiyo had seven science instruments:

- Solar X-Ray Detector (SXR): Designed to observe solar X-rays in two energy ranges (5.9-9.5 keV, 9.5-11.5 keV) and measure charged particles near the Earth's radiation belts.
- Lyman-alpha Radiation Monitor (SXU): Measured solar hydrogen Lyman-alpha radiation to study the Sun's chromosphere.
- Geocoronal and Middle Ultraviolet Radiometers (GMV): This system combined the Middle Ultraviolet Radiometer (MUV), which measured reflected solar light from atmospheric ozone, and the Vacuum Ultraviolet Photon Counter (GUV), which analyzed geocoronal emissions.
- Bennett Ion Mass Spectrometer (CPI): Examined ion composition in the upper atmosphere, identifying H+, He+, and O+ ions.
- Retarding Potential Analyzer (RPA): Measured ion density and temperature using voltage sweeps across ion traps.
- Electron Temperature Probe (TEL): Recorded electron temperature variations, capable of measuring up to 4000 K.
- Gyro-Plasma Probe (IMP): Analyzed electron density distribution through high-frequency impedance measurements.
