= 3C 346 =

Galaxy in the constellation Hercules

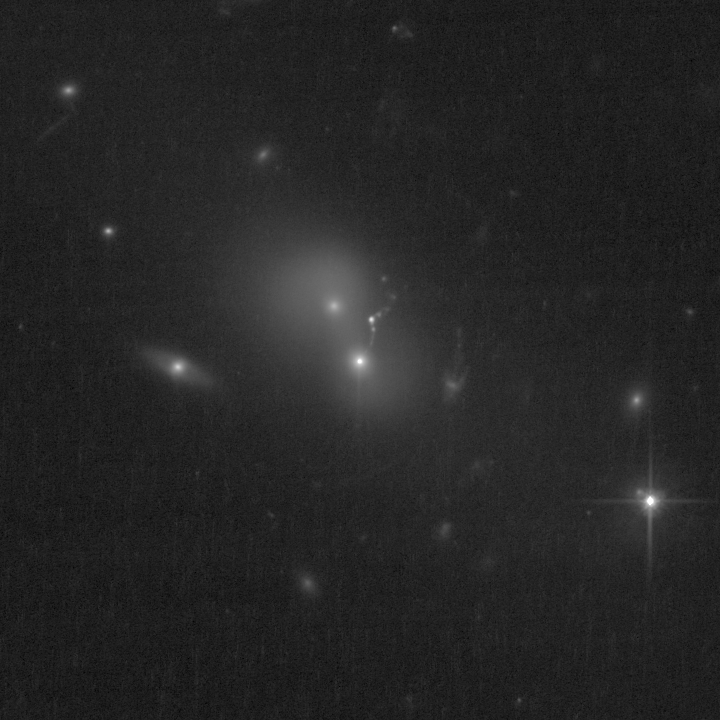
- Hubble Space Telescope image of 3C 346.

Observation data (J2000.0 epoch)
- Constellation: Hercules
- Right ascension: 16^{h} 43^{m} 48.59^{s}
- Declination: +17° 15′ 49.46″
- Redshift: 0.163025
- Heliocentric radial velocity: 48,874 km/s
- Distance: 2.484 Gly (761.59 Mpc)
- Apparent magnitude (B): 17.2

Characteristics
- Type: E;NLRG, Sy2
- Size: ~452,900 ly (138.85 kpc) (estimated)
- Notable features: Radio galaxy

Other designations
- 4C 17.70, PKS J1643+1715, PGC 58857, DA 422, OS 170, NVSS J164348+171548

3C 346 is an elliptical galaxy located in the constellation Hercules. It is located nearly 2.5 billion light years away from Earth and classified a Seyfert galaxy and a compact steep-spectrum source (CSS), although later studies confirm it as a Fanaroff-Riley class II source.

== Characteristics ==
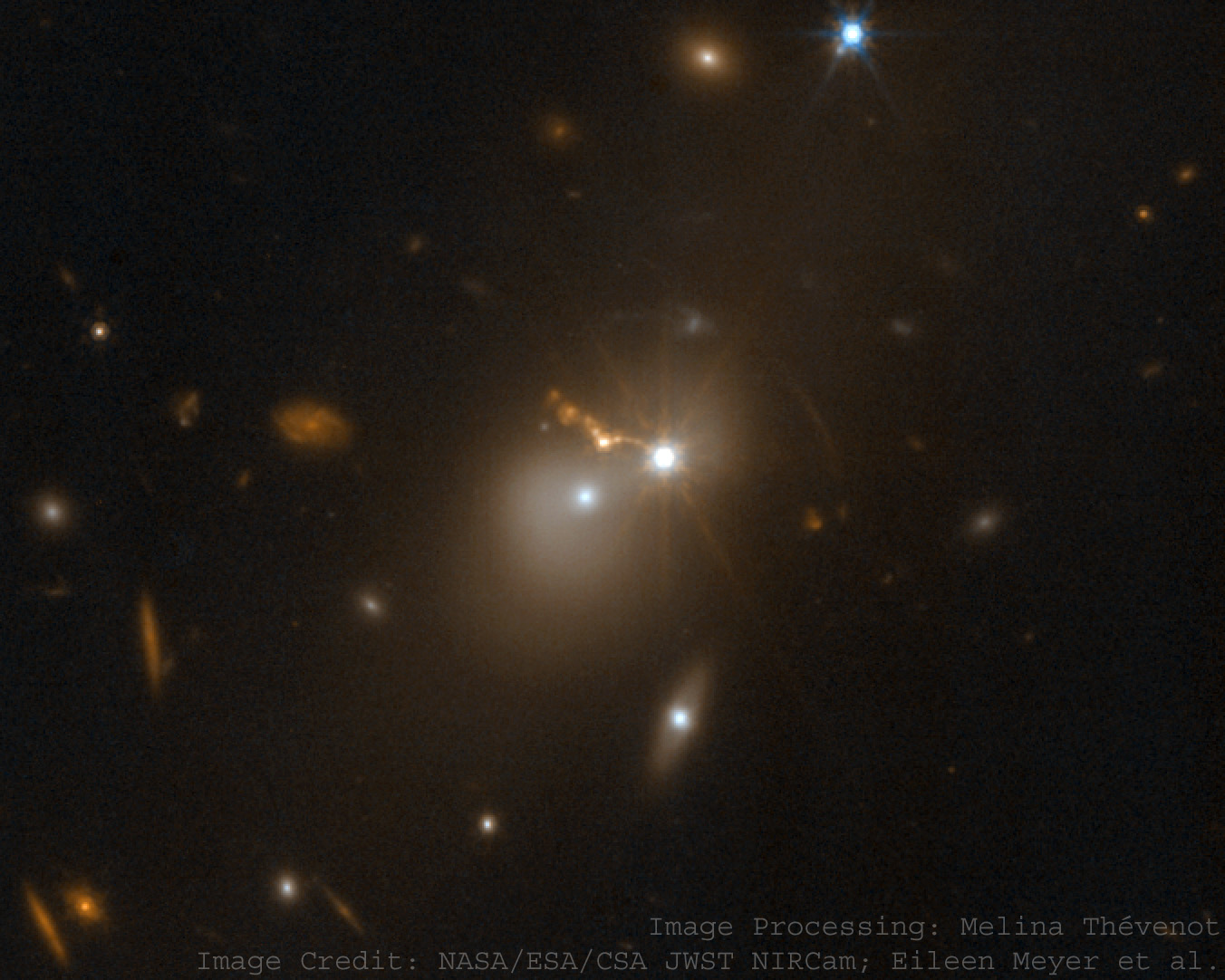
JWST NIRCam image, showing the jet

3C 346 is classified a narrow-line radio galaxy. It has a projected 0.5-3 keV luminosity of 1.4 × 10^{44} ergs s^{−1}. The galaxy has a lack of X-ray emission given most of it originates from a cluster environment with a temperature of 1.9^{+1.3}_{-0.7}. It is part of a double galaxy system where the object is found merging with a nearby companion galaxy. 3C 346 also contains a jetted double radio source when observed in X-rays and a bright hotspot region showing strong emission in ultraviolet, mainly caused by synchrotron radiation.

The point-like emission of 3C 346 is found to be unabsorbed, measuring N_{H} ≤ 2 × 10^{21} cm^{−2} with a spectral slope of α_{x} = 0.69^{+0.16}_{-0.14} and flux of 7.4 × 10^{−13} ^{erg} cm^{−2} s^{−1} when observed by ROSAT PSPC observations. However, when observed by the Advanced Satellite for Cosmology and Astrophysics (ASCA) two years later, the emission presents a different spectral slope of α_{x} = 0.73^{+0.17}_{-0.23} with a lower flux level of 7.4 × 10^{−13} erg cm^{−2} s^{−1}.

The nucleus of 3C 346 is found to be luminous. It contains a core component in which a one-sided radio jet is seen emerging with a projected extension of around ~ 2 arcsecs, hinting the jet's inclination to the line of sight has a tiny angle. Reaching at high radio frequencies, the jet of 3C 346 contains individual bright knots located at different positions with increased distances from the core region.

According to the jet being detected using Hubble Space Telescope optical polarimetry, Very Large Array polarimetry at 14.9 and 22.5 GHz and data from Chandra X-ray observatory, it shows similarities between optical and radio morphology. However the X-ray emission is found offset by 0.80 ± 0.17 kiloparsecs from both optical and radio peak positions. Based on polarization modeling, the jet of 3C 346 has a relativistic upstream flow of β_{u} = 0.91^{+0.05}_{-0.07} with an inclined shock front plane angle of η = 51° ± 11° and upstream flow angle of θ = 14^{+8}_{−7} degrees. The deflection angle of the jet on the other hand, is 22°.

There is also the presence of an extended structure with an extent of ~ 12" around the jet and its opposite side. When observed at 1.7 GHz, the region has two other components with an estimated separation of ~ 2".2. One of the components is found to be stronger and compacted, while the other component is merely a glowing knot inside the jet and mainly surrounded by extended emission.
