= Advanced Satellite for Cosmology and Astrophysics =

Japanese cosmic X-ray astronomy mission

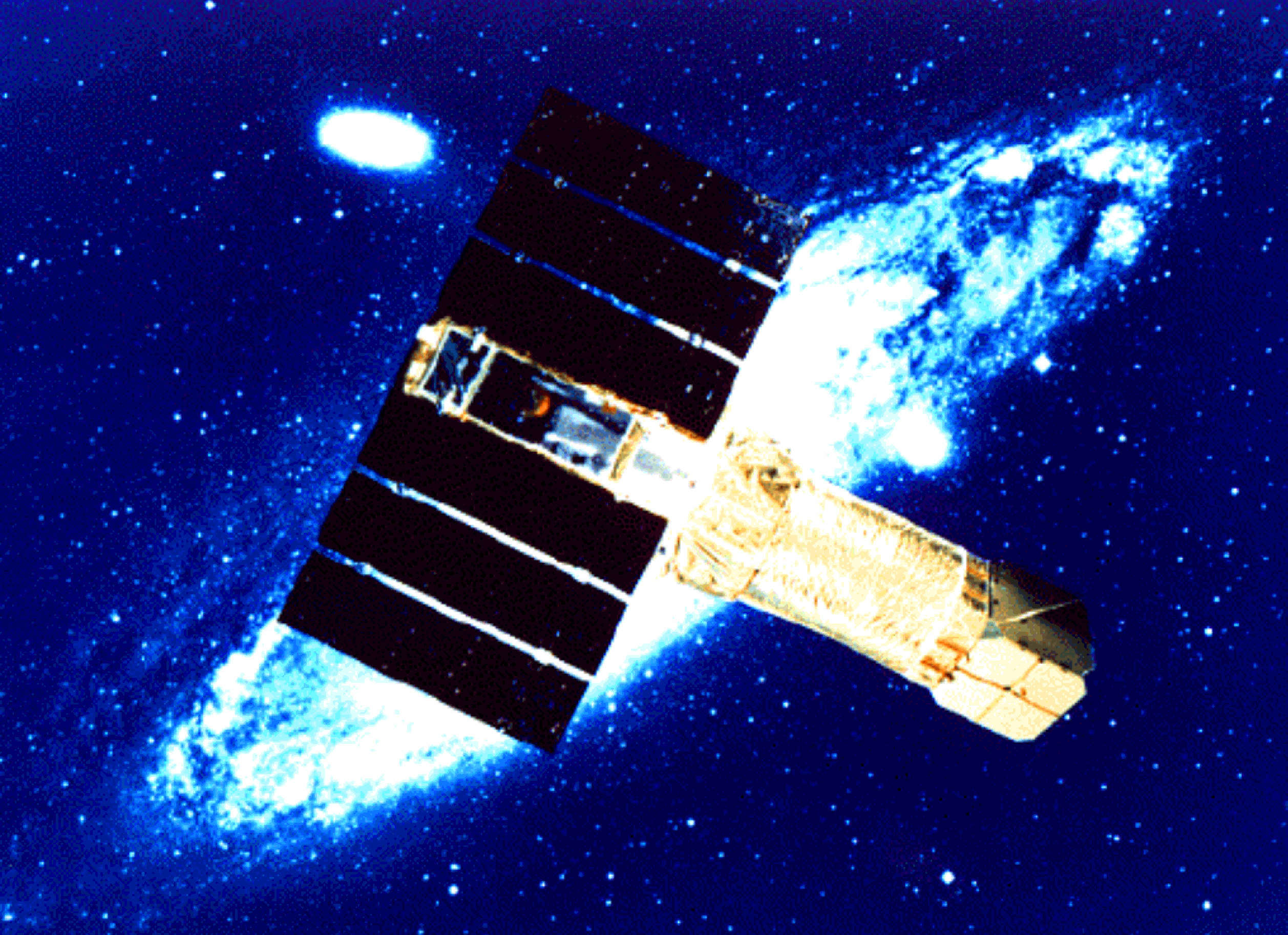
- Names: ASTRO-D, Asuka
- Mission type: X-ray observatory
- Operator: ISAS / NASA
- COSPAR ID: 1993-011A
- SATCAT no.: 22521
- Website: http://heasarc.gsfc.nasa.gov/docs/asca/
- Mission duration: Final: 8 years, 10 days

Spacecraft properties
- Manufacturer: NEC
- Launch mass: 420 kg (930 lb)
- Dimensions: 4.7 m (15 ft) long

Start of mission
- Launch date: 20 February 1993, 02:20 UTC
- Rocket: Mu-3SII, mission M-3SII-7
- Launch site: Kagoshima Space Center, Japan
- Contractor: ISAS

End of mission
- Disposal: deorbited
- Decay date: 2 March 2001, 14:20 UTC

Orbital parameters
- Reference system: Geocentric
- Regime: Low Earth
- Eccentricity: 0.01
- Perigee altitude: 523.6 km (325.3 mi)
- Apogee altitude: 615.3 km (382.3 mi)
- Inclination: 31.1°
- Period: 96.09 minutes
- Epoch: 20 February 1993

Main telescope
- Type: Wolter
- Diameter: 1.2 m (3.9 ft)
- Focal length: 3.5 m (11 ft)
- Collecting area: 1,300 cm^{2} (200 sq in) @ 1 kev 600 cm^{2} (93 sq in) @ 7 keV
- Wavelengths: X-ray, SIS: 3–0.12 nm (0.4–10 keV); GIS: 1.8–0.12 nm (0.7–10 keV)
Instruments
- XRT: X-ray Telescope
- SIS: Solid-State Imaging Spectrometer
- GIS: Gas Imaging Spectrometer

The Advanced Satellite for Cosmology and Astrophysics (ASCA, formerly named ASTRO-D) was the fourth cosmic X-ray astronomy mission by JAXA, and the second for which the United States provided part of the scientific payload. The satellite was successfully launched on 20 February 1993. The first eight months of the ASCA mission were devoted to performance verification. Having established the quality of performance of all ASCA's instruments, the spacecraft provided science observations for the remainder of the mission. In this phase the observing program was open to astronomers based at Japanese and U.S. institutions, as well as those located in member states of the European Space Agency.

== X-ray astronomy mission ==
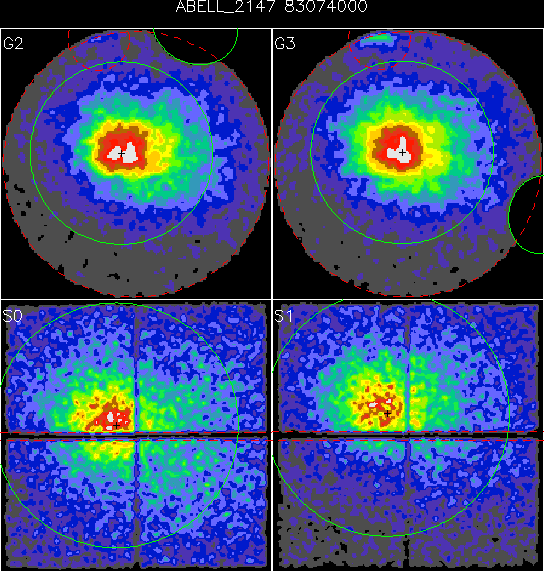
Abell 2147 galaxy cluster images of each detector showing the region file used for that instrument.

ASCA was the first X-ray astronomy mission to combine imaging capability with a broad passband, good spectral resolution, and a large effective area. The mission also was the first satellite to use CCDs for X-ray astronomy. With these properties, the primary scientific purpose of ASCA was the X-ray spectroscopy of astrophysical plasmas, especially the analysis of discrete features such as emission lines and absorption edges.

ASCA carried four large-area X-ray telescopes. At the focus of two of the telescopes is a gas imaging spectrometer (GIS), while a solid-state imaging spectrometer (SIS) is at the focus of the other two. The GIS is a gas-imaging scintillation proportional counter and is based on the GSPC that flew on the second Japanese X-ray astronomy mission, Tenma. The two identical charge-coupled device (CCD) cameras were provided for the two SISs by a hardware team from MIT, Osaka University and ISAS.

== Significant contributions ==
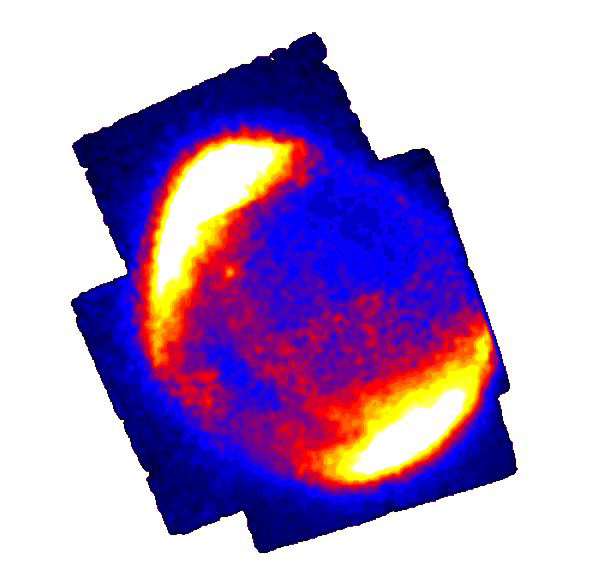
X-ray image of SN 1006, taken by ASCA

The ASCA was launched by ISAS (Institute of Space and Astronautical Sciences), Japan.

The sensitivity of ASCA's instruments allowed for the first detailed, broad-band spectra of distant quasars to be derived. In addition, ASCA's suite of instruments provided the best opportunity at the time for identifying the sources whose combined emission makes up the cosmic X-ray background.

It performed over 3000 observations, and produced over 1000 publications in refereed journals so far. The ASCA archive contains significant amounts of data for future analyses. Furthermore, the mission is termed highly successful when reflecting on what scientists in many counties have accomplished using ASCA data up to this time.

The U.S. contributed significantly to ASCA's scientific payloads. In return, 40% of ASCA observing time was made available to U.S. scientists. (ISAS also opened up 10% of the time to ESA scientists as a good-will gesture.) In addition, all ASCA data enter the public domain after a suitable period (1 year for U.S. data, 18 months for Japanese data) and become available to scientists worldwide. The design of ASCA was optimized for X-ray spectroscopy; thus it complemented ROSAT (optimized for X-ray imaging) and RXTE (optimized for timing studies). Finally, ASCA results cover almost the entire range of objects, from nearby stars to the most distant objects in the universe.

== Mission end ==
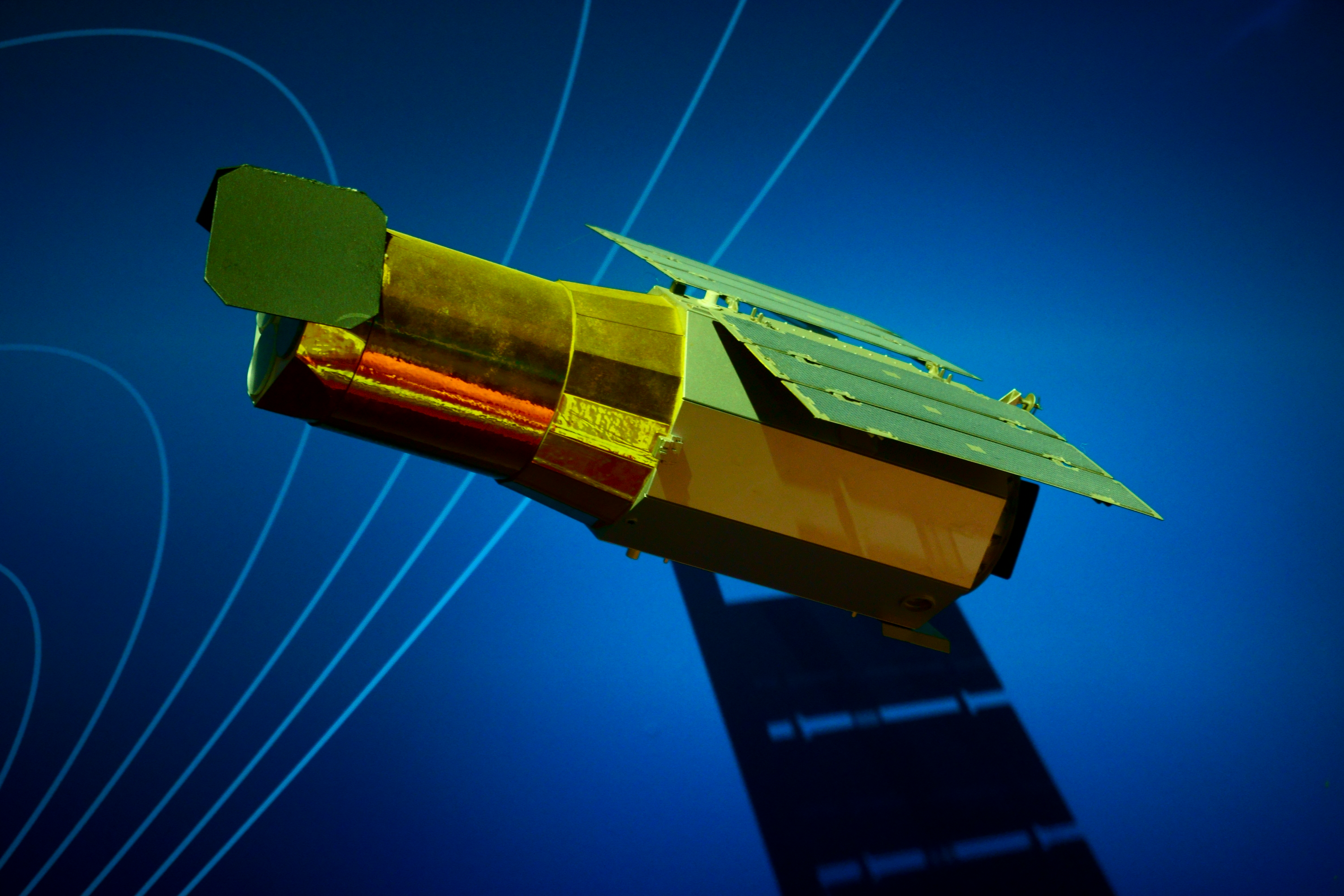
Scale model of ASCA at Noshiro City Children's Center

The mission operated successfully for over 7 years until attitude control was lost on 14 July 2000 during a geomagnetic storm, after which no scientific observations were performed. ASCA reentered the atmosphere on 2 March 2001 after more than 8 years in orbit.

The primary responsibility of the U.S. ASCA GOF was to enable U.S. astronomers to make the best use of the ASCA mission, in close collaboration with the Japanese ASCA team.
