= Nozomi (spacecraft) =

Failed Japanese orbiter mission to Mars (1998–2003)

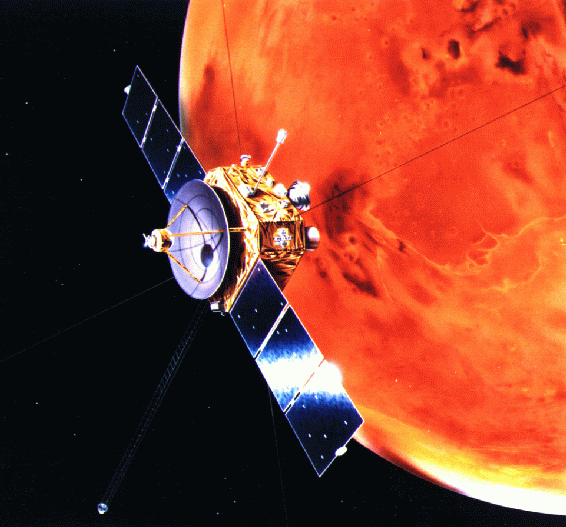
- Artist's concept of Nozomi orbiter at Mars
- Names: PLANET-B
- Mission type: Mars orbiter
- Operator: JAXA
- COSPAR ID: 1998-041A
- SATCAT no.: 25383
- Website: isas.jaxa.jp
- Mission duration: 5 years, 5 months and 6 days

Spacecraft properties
- Manufacturer: ISAS
- Launch mass: 540 kg (1,190 lb)
- Dry mass: 225 kg (496 lb)
- Payload mass: 33 kg (73 lb)
- Dimensions: 1.6 × 1.6 × 0.58 m (5.2 × 5.2 × 1.9 ft)

Start of mission
- Launch date: July 3, 1998, 18:12:00 UTC
- Rocket: M-V
- Launch site: Uchinoura Space Center

End of mission
- Disposal: Decommissioned
- Deactivated: December 31, 2003
- Last contact: December 9, 2003

Orbital parameters
- Reference system: Heliocentric

Transponders
- Frequency: X-band: 8410.93 MHz; S-band: 2293.89 MHz

Nozomi (Japanese: のぞみ; lit. "Wish" or "Hope", and known before launch as Planet-B) was a Japanese Mars orbiter that failed to reach Mars due to electrical failure. It was constructed by the Institute of Space and Astronautical Science, University of Tokyo and launched on July 4, 1998, at 03:12 JST (July 3, 1998, at 18:12 UTC) with an on-orbit dry mass of 258 kg and 282 kg of propellant. The Nozomi mission was terminated on December 31, 2003.

Nozomi was designed to study the upper Martian atmosphere and its interaction with the solar wind and to develop technologies for use in future planetary missions. Specifically, instruments on the spacecraft were to measure the structure, composition and dynamics of the ionosphere, aeronomy effects of the solar wind, the escape of atmospheric constituents, the intrinsic magnetic field, the penetration of the solar-wind magnetic field, the structure of the magnetosphere, and dust in the upper atmosphere and in orbit around Mars. The mission would have also returned images of Mars's surface.

== Mission profile ==
=== Launch ===
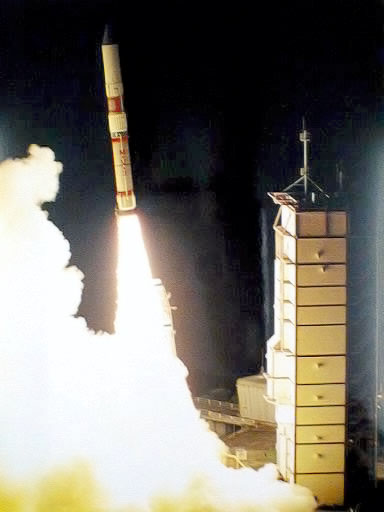
Nozomi's launch on July 3, 1998

After launch on the third M-V launch vehicle, Nozomi was put into an elliptical geocentric parking orbit with a perigee of 340 km and an apogee of 400,000 km.

=== Lunar swing-bys ===
The spacecraft used a lunar swingby on September 24, 1998, and another on December 18, 1998, to increase the apogee of its orbit.

=== Earth swing-by ===
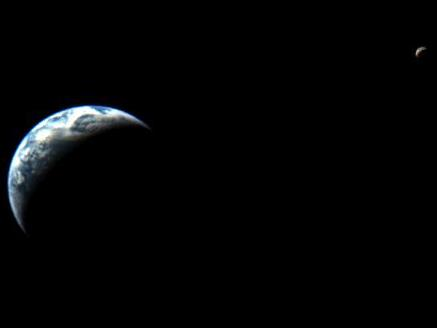
This image of the Earth and Moon was the first picture taken by the Nozomi camera.

Animation of Nozomi's orbit around Sun Nozomi · Sun · Earth · Mars

It flew by Earth on December 20, 1998, at a perigee of about 1000 km. The gravitational assist from the flyby coupled with a 7 minute burn of the bipropellant rocket put Nozomi into an escape trajectory towards Mars. It was scheduled to arrive at Mars on October 11, 1999, at 7:45:14 UT, but a malfunctioning valve during the Earth swingby resulted in a loss of fuel and left the spacecraft with insufficient acceleration to reach its planned trajectory. Two course correction burns on December 21 used more propellant than planned, leaving the spacecraft short of fuel.

=== New mission plan ===
The new plan was for Nozomi to remain in heliocentric orbit for an additional four years, including two Earth flybys in December 2002 and June 2003, and encounter Mars at a slower relative velocity in December 2003, or January 1, 2004.

=== First Earth flyby ===
On April 21, 2002, as Nozomi was approaching Earth for the gravity assist maneuver, powerful solar flares damaged the spacecraft's onboard communications and power systems. An electrical short occurred in a power cell used to control the attitude control heating system, allowing the hydrazine fuel to freeze. The fuel thawed out as the craft approached Earth and maneuvers to put the craft on the correct trajectory for its Earth flyby were successful.

=== Second Earth flyby ===
Another Earth flyby within 11,000 km occurred on June 19, 2003. The fuel had completely thawed out for this maneuver because of the spacecraft's proximity to the Sun. However, on December 9, 2003, efforts to orient the craft to prepare it for a December 14, 2003, main thruster orbital insertion burn failed, and efforts to save the mission were abandoned. The small thrusters were fired on December 9, moving the closest approach distance to 1,000 km so that the probe would not inadvertently impact on Mars and possibly contaminate the planet with Earth bacteria, since the orbiter had not been intended to land and was therefore not properly sterilized.

=== Mars flyby ===
The spacecraft flew by Mars on December 14, 2003, and went into a roughly 2-year heliocentric orbit.

=== Intended Mars mission ===
Nozomi was to be inserted into a highly eccentric Mars orbit with a periareion 300 km above the surface, an apoareion of 15 Mars radii, and an inclination of 170 degrees with respect to the ecliptic plane. Shortly after insertion, the mast and antennas were to be deployed. The periareion would have been lowered to 150 km, the orbital period to about 38.5 hours. The spacecraft was to be spin stabilized at 7.5 rpm with its spin axis (and the dish antenna) pointed towards Earth. The periapsis portion of the orbit would have allowed in-situ measurements of the thermosphere and lower exosphere and remote sensing of the lower atmosphere and surface. The more distant parts of the orbit would be for study of the ions and neutral gas escaping from Mars and their interactions with the solar wind. The nominal mission was planned for one Martian year (approximately two Earth years). An extended mission might have allowed operation of the mission for three to five years. The spacecraft was also to point its cameras at the Martian moons Phobos and Deimos.

== Spacecraft and subsystems ==
The Nozomi orbiter was a 0.58 meter high, 1.6 meter square prism with truncated corners. Extending out from two opposite sides were solar panel wings containing silicon solar cells which provide power to the spacecraft directly or via NiMH (nickel metal hydride) batteries. On the top surface was a dish antenna, and a propulsion unit protrudes from the bottom. A 5 m deployable mast and a 1 m boom extended from the sides, along with two pairs of thin wire antennas which measure 50 m tip to tip. Other instruments were also arranged along the sides of the spacecraft. Spacecraft communications were via X-band at 8410.93 MHz and S-band at 2293.89 MHz.

The 14 instruments carried on Nozomi were an imaging camera, neutral mass spectrometer, dust counter, thermal plasma analyzer, magnetometer, electron and ion spectrum analyzers, ion mass spectrograph, high energy particles experiment, VUV imaging spectrometer, sounder and plasma wave detector, LF wave analyzer, electron temperature probe, and a UV scanner. The total mass budgeted for the science instruments was 33 kg. Radio science experiments were also possible using the existing radio equipment and an ultrastable oscillator.

The total mass of Nozomi at launch, including 282 kg of propellant, was 540 kg.

Canada provided a $5 million thermal plasma analyzer. This was the Canadian Space Agency's first participation in an interplanetary mission. (Previously, the National Research Council of Canada provided the High Flux Telescope (HFT) for the Ulysses interplanetary mission.)

== Scientific instruments ==
The spacecraft carried 14 scientific instruments to conduct scientific observations of Mars. They were

- Mars Imaging Camera
- Magnetic Field Measurement (MGF)
- Probe for Electron Temperature (PET)
- Electron Spectrum Analyzer (ESA)
- Ion Spectrum Analyzer (ISA)
- Electron and Ion Spectrometer (EIS)
- Extra Ultraviolet Scanner (XUV)
- Ultraviolet Imaging Spectrometer (UVS)
- Plasma Wave and Sounder (PWS)
- Low Frequency Plasma Wave Analyzer (LFA)
- Ion Mass Imager (IMI)
- Mars Dust Counter (MDC)
- Neutral Mass Spectrometer (NMS)
- Thermal Plasma Analyzer (TPA)

== Scientific results ==
Nozomi transmitted useful data on measurement of Lyman-alpha light during the course of conducting various scientific observations in interplanetary space.

== See also ==
- List of missions to Mars
  - MELOS
  - MMX
