= Hakucho =

Space observatory

Hakuchō
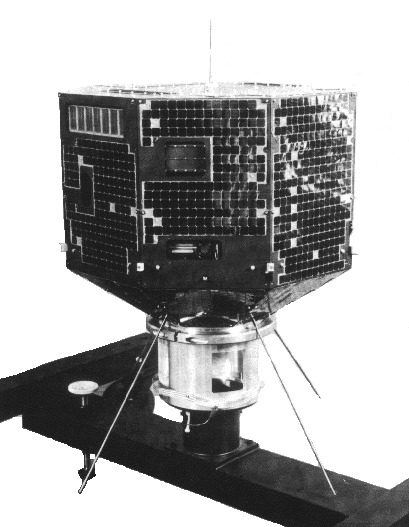
- Mission type: X Ray Celestial Observation
- Operator: Institute of Space and Astronautical Science (Japan)
- COSPAR ID: 1979-014A
- SATCAT no.: 11272

Spacecraft properties
- Launch mass: 96.0 kilograms (211.6 lb)
- Dimensions: ⌀760mm×650mm

Start of mission
- Launch date: 21 February 1979 UTC
- Rocket: M-3C-Rocket (mission 4)
- Launch site: Uchinoura Space Center, Kagoshima Prefecture, Japan

End of mission
- Decay date: April 15, 1985

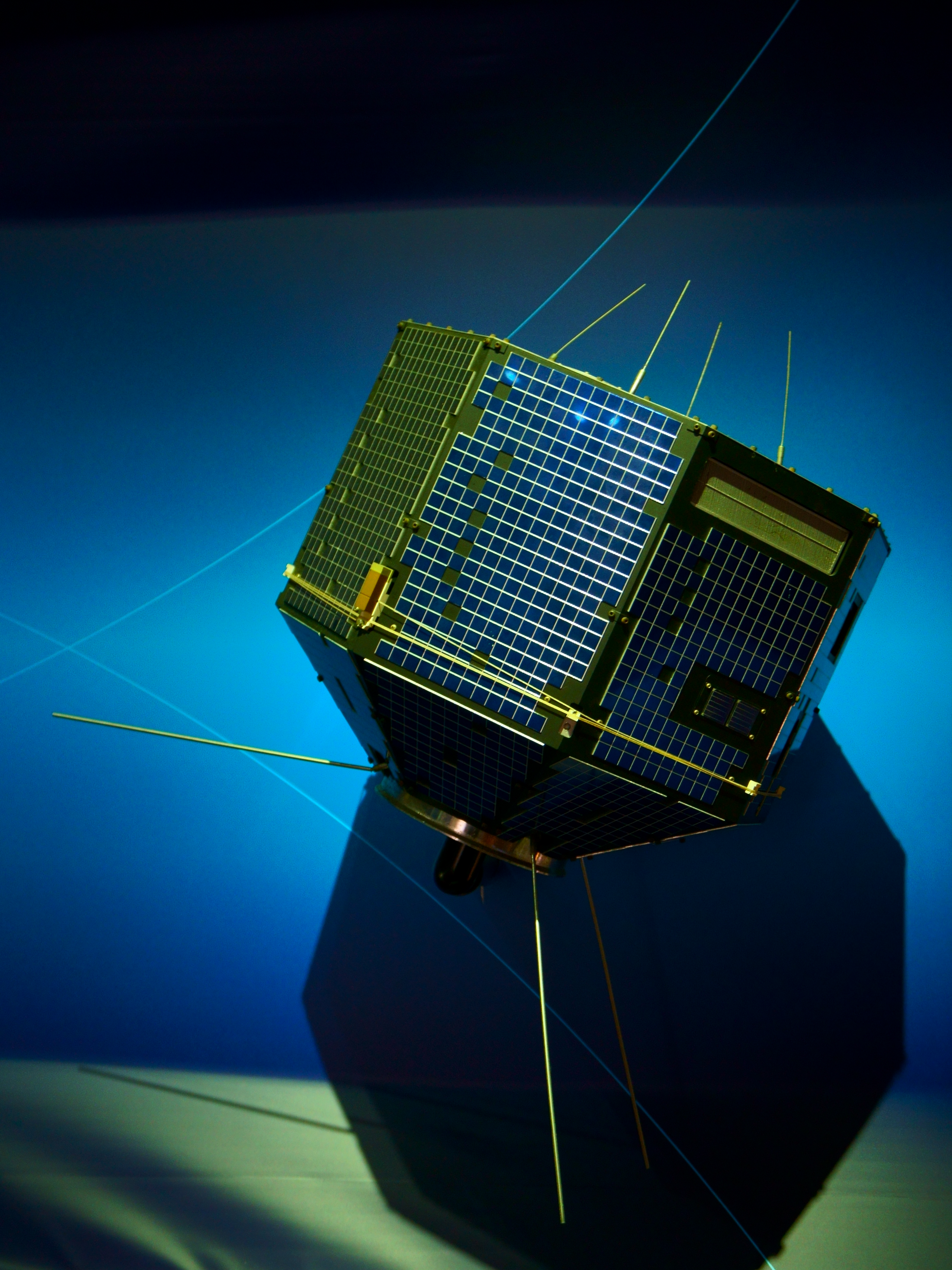
Scale model of the Hakucho at Noshiro City Children's Center

Hakucho (also known as CORSA-b before launch; CORSA stands for Cosmic Radiation Satellite) was Japan's first X-ray astronomy satellite, developed by the Institute of Space and Aeronautical Science (then a division of the University of Tokyo). It was launched from the Kagoshima Space Center by the ISAS M-3C rocket on the M-3C-4 mission on February 21, 1979 and reentered the atmosphere on April 15, 1985.

Hakucho was a replacement for the Cosmic Radiation Satellite (CORSA) satellite which failed to launch due to rocket failure on February 4, 1976.

== Highlights ==
- Discovery of soft X-ray transient Cen X-4 and Aql X-1
- Discovery of many burst sources
- Long-term monitoring of X-ray pulsars (e.g. Vela X-1)
- Discovery of 2 Hz variability in the Rapid Burster later named Quasi Period Oscillation.

== See also ==
- Timeline of artificial satellites and space probes
