= Hinotori (satellite) =

Japanese satellite

- Names: Astro-A
- Mission type: Astronomy
- Operator: ISAS
- COSPAR ID: 1981-017A
- SATCAT no.: 12307

Spacecraft properties
- BOL mass: 185 kilograms (408 lb)

Start of mission
- Launch date: 21 February 1981, 00:30:00 UTC
- Rocket: Mu-3S
- Launch site: Mu Pad, Kagoshima
- Contractor: ISAS

End of mission
- Decay date: 11 July 1991

Orbital parameters
- Reference system: Geocentric
- Regime: Low Earth
- Eccentricity: 0.00395
- Perigee altitude: 548 kilometres (341 mi)
- Apogee altitude: 603 kilometres (375 mi)
- Inclination: 31.3 degrees
- Period: 96.2 minutes
- Epoch: 21 February 1981, 04:30:00 UTC

Hinotori, also known as ASTRO-A before launch, was a Japanese X-ray astronomy satellite. It was developed by the Institute of Space and Astronautical Science (ISAS). Its primary mission was to study of solar flares emanating from the Sun during the solar maximum. It was launched successfully on February 21, 1981 using a M-3S rocket as the vehicle from Uchinoura Space Center (known at the time as Kagoshima). After the start of normal operation, it observed a large solar flare and, a month later, succeeded in observing 41 flares of many sizes from the Sun. It reentered the atmosphere on July 11, 1991. The name Hinotori is the Japanese word for Phoenix.

== Instruments ==
- Solar flare X-ray imager (SXT)
- Solar soft X-ray bright line spectrum analyzer (SOX)
- Solar soft X-ray monitor (HXM)
- Solar flare monitor (FLM)
- Solar gamma ray monitor (SGR)
- Particle ray monitor (PXM)
- Plasma electron density measurement instrument (IMP)
- Plasma electron temperature measurement instrument (TEL)

== Highlights ==
- Observational data of the maximum period of solar activity
- Discovery of high-temperature phenomena reaching up to 50 million °C and clouds of light-speed electrons floating in the corona of the Sun
