= Cosmic Radiation Satellite =

Japanese satellite lost in a 1976 launch

The Cosmic Radiation Satellite (CORSA, also CORSA-A) was a Japanese space telescope. It was supposed to be Japan's first X-ray astronomy satellite but was lost due to failure of its Mu-3 launch vehicle on 4 Feb 1976. A replacement satellite Hakucho (CORSA-b) was later launched.

== Sources ==
- "NASA - NSSDC - Spacecraft - Details (CORSA)". NASA.
- "Astronautix - Corsa A". Astronautix. Archived from the original on 2007-11-06.
