= Kosmos 801 =

Soviet Union satellite (1976–1978)

- Mission type: ABM radar target
- COSPAR ID: 1976-012A
- SATCAT no.: 08658

Spacecraft properties
- Spacecraft type: DS-P1-I
- Manufacturer: Yuzhnoye
- Launch mass: 400 kilograms (880 lb)

Start of mission
- Launch date: 5 February 1976, 14:39 UTC
- Rocket: Kosmos-2I 63SM
- Launch site: Plesetsk 133/1

End of mission
- Decay date: 5 January 1978

Orbital parameters
- Reference system: Geocentric
- Regime: Low Earth
- Perigee altitude: 268 kilometres (167 mi)
- Apogee altitude: 796 kilometres (495 mi)
- Inclination: 71 degrees
- Period: 95.3 minutes

Kosmos 801 (Russian: Космос 801 meaning Cosmos 801), also known as DS-P1-I No.16 was a satellite which was used as a radar target for anti-ballistic missile tests. It was launched by the Soviet Union in 1976 as part of the Dnepropetrovsk Sputnik programme.

It was launched aboard a Kosmos-2I 63SM rocket, from Site 133/1 at Plesetsk. The launch occurred at 14:39 UTC on 5 February 1976.

Kosmos 801 was placed into a low Earth orbit with a perigee of 268 kilometres (167 mi), an apogee of 796 kilometres (495 mi), 71 degrees of inclination, and an orbital period of 95.3 minutes. It decayed from orbit on 5 January 1978.

Kosmos 801 was the sixteenth of nineteen DS-P1-I satellites to be launched. Of these, all reached orbit successfully except the seventh.

== See also ==
- 1976 in spaceflight
