= Kosmos 849 =

Soviet anti-satellite test target satellite

- Mission type: ABM radar target
- COSPAR ID: 1976-083A
- SATCAT no.: 09382

Spacecraft properties
- Spacecraft type: DS-P1-I
- Manufacturer: Yuzhnoye
- Launch mass: 400 kilograms (880 lb)

Start of mission
- Launch date: 18 August 1976, 09:30 UTC
- Rocket: Kosmos-2I 63SM
- Launch site: Plesetsk 133/1

End of mission
- Decay date: 24 April 1978

Orbital parameters
- Reference system: Geocentric
- Regime: Low Earth
- Perigee altitude: 264 kilometres (164 mi)
- Apogee altitude: 865 kilometres (537 mi)
- Inclination: 71 degrees
- Period: 96 minutes

Kosmos 849 (Russian: Космос 849 meaning Cosmos 849), also known as DS-P1-I No.17 was a satellite which was used as a radar target for anti-ballistic missile tests. It was launched by the Soviet Union in 1976 as part of the Dnepropetrovsk Sputnik programme.

It was launched aboard a Kosmos-2I 63SM rocket, from Site 133/1 at Plesetsk. The launch occurred at 09:30 UTC on 18 August 1976.

Kosmos 849 was placed into a low Earth orbit with a perigee of 264 kilometres (164 mi), an apogee of 865 kilometres (537 mi), 71 degrees of inclination, and an orbital period of 96 minutes. It decayed from orbit on 24 April 1978.

Kosmos 849 was the seventeenth of nineteen DS-P1-I satellites to be launched. Of these, all reached orbit successfully except the seventh.

== See also ==
- 1976 in spaceflight
