= Kosmos 818 =

Soviet radar calibration satellite

- Mission type: ABM radar target
- COSPAR ID: 1976-044A
- SATCAT no.: 08851

Spacecraft properties
- Spacecraft type: DS-P1-Yu
- Manufacturer: Yuzhnoye
- Launch mass: 400 kilograms (880 lb)

Start of mission
- Launch date: 18 May 1976, 11:00 UTC
- Rocket: Kosmos-2I 63SM
- Launch site: Plesetsk 133/1

End of mission
- Decay date: 7 March 1977

Orbital parameters
- Reference system: Geocentric
- Regime: Low Earth
- Perigee altitude: 267 kilometres (166 mi)
- Apogee altitude: 468 kilometres (291 mi)
- Inclination: 71 degrees
- Period: 91.9 minutes

Kosmos 818 (Russian: Космос 818 meaning Cosmos 818), also known as DS-P1-Yu No.78, was a Soviet satellite which was launched in 1976 as part of the Dnepropetrovsk Sputnik programme. It was a 400-kilogram (880 lb) spacecraft, which was built by the Yuzhnoye Design Bureau, and was used as a radar calibration target for anti-ballistic missile tests.

A Kosmos-2I 63SM carrier rocket was used to launch Kosmos 818 from Site 133/1 of the Plesetsk Cosmodrome. The launch occurred at 11:00 UTC on 18 May 1976, and resulted in the successfully insertion of the satellite into low Earth orbit. Upon reaching orbit, the satellite was assigned its Kosmos designation, and received the International Designator 1976-044A. The North American Aerospace Defense Command assigned it the catalogue number 08851.

Kosmos 818 was the seventy-eighth and penultimate DS-P1-Yu satellite to be launched, and the seventy-first to successfully reach orbit. It was operated in an orbit with a perigee of 267 kilometres (166 mi), an apogee of 468 kilometres (291 mi), 71 degrees of inclination, and an orbital period of 91.9 minutes. It remained in orbit until it decayed and reentered the atmosphere on 7 March 1977.

== See also ==
- 1976 in spaceflight
