= Mu (rocket family) =

Series of Japanese carrier rockets

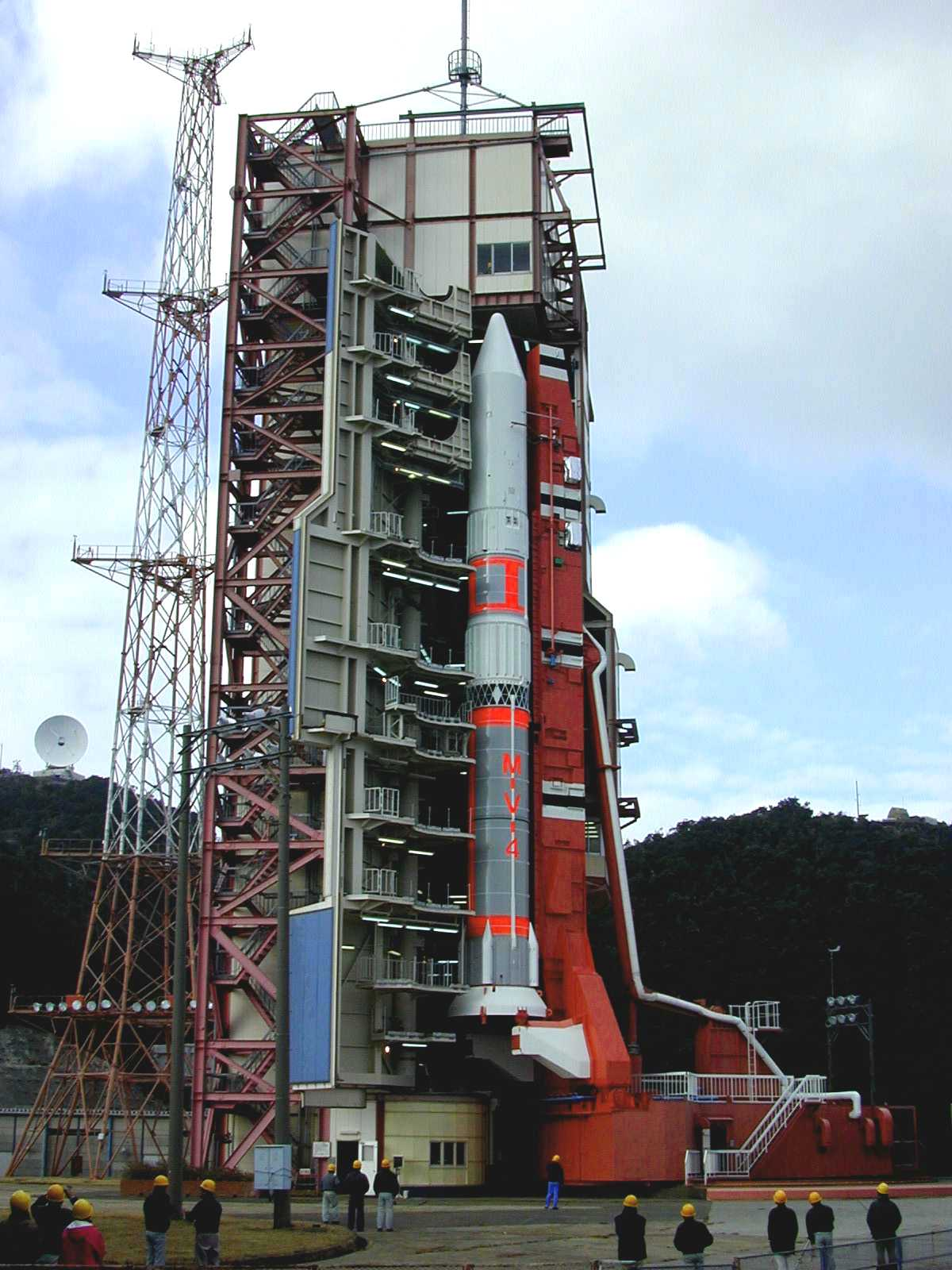
M-V-4.

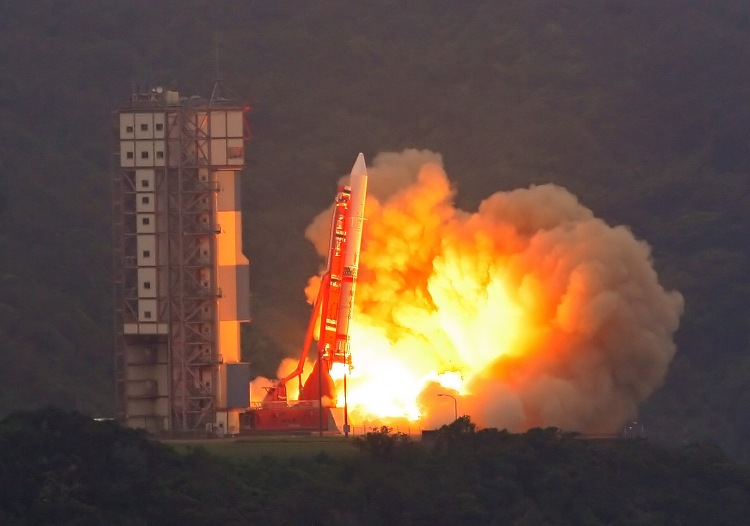
M-V-6.

The Mu, also known as M, was a series of Japanese solid-fueled carrier rockets, which were launched from Uchinoura between 1966 and 2006. Originally developed by Japan's Institute of Space and Astronautical Science, Mu rockets were later operated by JAXA following ISAS becoming part of it.

== Early Japanese carrier rockets ==
The first Mu rocket, the Mu-1 made a single, sub-orbital, test flight, on 31 October 1966. Subsequently, a series of rockets were produced, designated Mu-3 and Mu-4. In 1969 a suborbital test launch of the Mu-3D was conducted. The first orbital launch attempt for the Mu family, using a Mu-4S, was conducted on 25 September 1970, however the fourth stage did not ignite, and the rocket failed to reach orbit. On 16 February 1971, Tansei 1 was launched by another Mu-4S rocket. Two further Mu-4S launches took place during 1971 and 1972. The Mu-4S was replaced by the Mu-3C, was launched four times between 1974 and 1979, with three successes and one failure, and the Mu-3H, which was launched three times in 1977 and 1978. The Mu-3S was used between 1980 and 1984, making four launches. The final member of the Mu-3 family was the Mu-3SII, which was launched eight times between 1985 and 1995. The Mu-3 was replaced in service by the M-V.

The Mu family of rockets.

== M-V ==
The M-V, or Mu-5, was introduced in 1997 and retired in 2006. Seven launches, six of which were successful, were conducted. Typically, the M-V flew in a three-stage configuration, however a four-stage configuration, designated M-V KM was used 3 times, with the MUSES-B (HALCA) satellite in 1997, Nozomi (PLANET-B) spacecraft in 1998, and the Hayabusa (MUSES-C) spacecraft in 2003. The three-stage configuration had a maximum payload of 1,800 kg (4,000 lb) for an orbit with altitude of 200 km (120 mi) and inclination of 30°, and 1,300 kg (2,900 lb) to a polar orbit (90° inclination), with an altitude of 200 km (120 mi). The M-V KM could launch 1,800 kg (4,000 lb) to an orbit with 30° inclination and 400 km (250 mi) altitude.

The three stage M-V had a total launch mass of 137,500 kg (303,100 lb), whilst the total mass of a four-stage M-V KM was 139,000 kg (306,000 lb).

== List of launches ==
All launches are from the Mu Launch Pad at the Uchinoura Space Center.

Flight number	Date (UTC)	Payload	Orbit	Result	Remarks
M-4S-1	September 25, 1970; 05:00	MS-F1	LEO (planned)	Failure	
M-4S-2	February 16, 1971; 04:00	MS-T1 (Tansei 1)	LEO	Success	
M-4S-3	September 28, 1971; 04:00	MS-F2 (Shinsei)	LEO	Success	
M-4S-4	August 19, 1972; 02:40	REXS (Denpa)	MEO	Success	
M-3C-1	February 16, 1974; 05:00	MS-T2 (Tansei 2)	MEO	Success	
M-3C-2	February 24, 1975; 05:25	SRATS (Taiyo)	MEO	Success	
M-3C-3	February 4, 1976; 05:00	CORSA	LEO (planned)	Failure	
M-3H-1	February 19, 1977; 05:15	MS-T3 (Tansei 3)	MEO	Success	
M-3H-2	February 4, 1978; 07:00	EXOS-A (Kyokko)	MEO	Success	
M-3H-3	September 16, 1978; 05:00	EXOS-B (Jikiken)	HEO	Success	
M-3C-4	February 21, 1979; 05:00	CORSA-b (Hakucho)	LEO	Success	
M-3S-1	February 17, 1980; 00:40	MS-T4 (Tansei 4)	LEO	Success	
M-3S-2	February 21, 1981; 00:30	ASTRO-A (Hinotori)	LEO	Success	
M-3S-3	February 20, 1983; 05:10	ASTRO-B (Tenma)	LEO	Success	
M-3S-4	February 14, 1984; 08:00	EXOS-C (Ohzora)	LEO	Success	
M-3SII-1	January 7, 1985; 19:26	MS-T5 (Sakigake)	HTO	Success	
M-3SII-2	August 18, 1985; 23:33	PLANET-A (Suisei)	HTO	Success	
M-3SII-3	February 5, 1987; 06:30	ASTRO-C (Ginga)	LEO	Success	
M-3SII-4	February 21, 1989; 23:30	EXOS-D (Akebono)	MEO	Success	
M-3SII-5	January 24, 1990; 11:46	MUSES-A (Hiten)	LTO	Success	
M-3SII-6	August 30, 1991; 02:30	SOLAR-A (Yohkoh)	LEO	Success	
M-3SII-7	February 20, 1993; 02:20	ASTRO-D/ASCA (Asuka)	LEO	Success	
M-3SII-8	January 15, 1995; 13:45	EXPRESS	LEO	Partial failure	
M-V-1	February 12, 1997; 04:50	MUSES-B/HALCA (Haruka)	HEO	Success	
M-V-3	July 3, 1998; 18:12	PLANET-B (Nozomi)	HTO	Success	
M-V-4	February 10, 2000; 01:30	ASTRO-E	LEO (planned)	Failure	
M-V-5	May 9, 2003; 04:29	MUSES-C (Hayabusa)	HTO	Success	
M-V-6	July 10, 2005; 03:30	ASTRO-EII (Suzaku)	LEO	Success	
M-V-8	February 21, 2006; 21:28	ASTRO-F (Akari)	LEO	Success	
M-V-7	September 22, 2006; 21:36	SOLAR-B (Hinode)	LEO	Success	

^Note Two sub-orbital launches of the Mu family were performed prior to its first orbital flight: the 1.5 stage Mu-1 flew on October 31, 1966, at 05:04 UTC and the 3.5 stage Mu-3D flew on August 17, 1969, at 06:00 UTC.

== See also ==
- Epsilon (rocket)
- J-I
- Comparison of orbital launchers families
- Comparison of orbital launch systems
