= Institute of Space and Astronautical Science =

Japanese research institute

Coordinates: 35.558389°N 139.395255°E

- 宇宙科学研究所 (Japanese); Uchū Kagaku Kenkyūsho (Japanese)

Agency overview
- Abbreviation: ISAS
- Type: Space agency
- Jurisdiction: Japan
- Headquarters: Sagamihara, Kanagawa Prefecture, Japan
- Official language: Japanese
- Primary spaceport: Uchinoura Space Center
- Employees: 353 (FY2018)
- Annual budget: ¥13.5 billion (FY2018) (US$ 0.12 billion)
- Website: www.isas.jaxa.jp/en/index.html

Institute of Space and Astronautical Science (宇宙科学研究所, Uchū Kagaku Kenkyūsho), or ISAS, is a Japanese national research organization of astrophysics using rockets, astronomical satellites and interplanetary probes which played a major role in Japan's space development. Established as part of the University of Tokyo in 1964, the institute spun off from the university to come under direct purview of the Ministry of Education. Since 2003, it is a division of Japan Aerospace Exploration Agency (JAXA).

== History ==
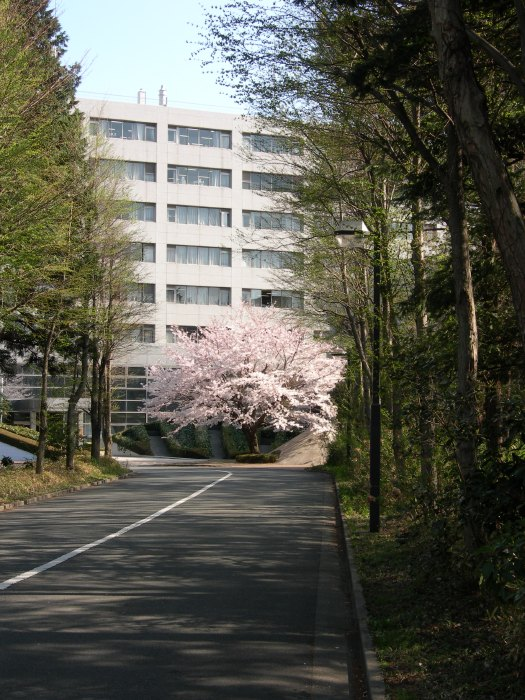
Entrance to the ISAS Sagamihara Campus

The ISAS originated as part of the Institute of Industrial Science of the University of Tokyo, where Hideo Itokawa experimented with miniature solid-fuel rockets (Pencil Rocket and Baby Rocket) in the 1950s. This experimentation eventually led to the development of the Κ (Kappa) sounding rocket, which was used for observations during the International Geophysical Year (IGY). By 1960, the Κ-8 rocket had reached an altitude of 200 km.

In 1964, the rocket group and the Institute of Aeronautics, along with scientific ballooning team, were merged to form Institute of Space and Aeronautical Science (宇宙航空研究所, Uchū kōkū kenkyūjo) within the University of Tokyo. The rocket evolved into the L (Lambda) series, and, in 1970, L-4S-5 was launched as Japan's first artificial satellite Ohsumi.

Although Lambda rockets were only sounding rockets, the next generation of M (Mu) rockets was intended to be satellite launch vehicles from the start. Beginning in 1971, ISAS launched a series of scientific satellites to observe the ionosphere and magnetosphere. Since the launch of Hakucho in 1979, ISAS has had X-ray astronomy satellites consecutively in orbit, until it was briefly terminated by the launch failure of ASTRO-E.

In 1981, as a part of university system reform, and for the mission expansion, ISAS was spun out from University of Tokyo as an inter-university national research organization, Institute of Space and Astronautical Science.

ISAS was responsible for launching Japan's first interplanetary probes, Sakigake and Suisei, to Halley's Comet in 1985. It also launched Hiten, Japan's first lunar probe, in 1990. The Nozomi probe was launched in 1998 in an attempt to orbit Mars, but the spacecraft suffered system failures and was unable to enter orbit. In 2003, ISAS launched the Hayabusa spacecraft, the first asteroid sample return mission in the world.

Later in 2003, three national aerospace organizations including ISAS were merged to form Japan Aerospace Exploration Agency (JAXA). The English name Institute of Space and Astronautical Science is still used, although the Japanese name was changed to 宇宙科学研究本部 (literally, Space Science Research Division, whereas the previous name's literal translation was Space Science Laboratory). In 2010, the name was changed back to the previous Uchū kagaku kenkyūjo (宇宙科学研究所). Under JAXA, ISAS continues to be responsible for space-based astronomy, and lunar and planetary exploration missions.

== List of spacecraft by ISAS ==
Launch failures, cancelled projects, proposals etc. are not listed.

=== Before establishment of JAXA ===
Launch date	Name before launch	Name after launch	Mission
11 February 1970		Ohsumi	Technology demonstration
16 February 1971	MS-T1	Tansei	Technology demonstration
28 September 1971	MS-F2	Shinsei	Ionosphere / cosmic-ray / solar-radio observation
19 August 1972	REXS	Denpa	Ionosphere / magnetosphere observation
16 February 1974	MS-T2	Tansei–2	Technology experiment
24 February 1975	SRATS	Taiyo	Thermosphere and sun
19 February 1977	MS-T3	Tansei–3	Technology experiment
4 February 1978	EXOS-A	Kyokko	Aurora and ionosphere
16 September 1978	EXOS-B	Jikiken	Magnetosphere and thermosphere observation
21 February 1979	CORSA-b	Hakucho	X-ray astronomy
17 February 1980	MS-T4	Tansei–4	Technology experiment
21 February 1981	ASTRO-A	Hinotori	Solar X-ray observation
20 February 1983	ASTRO-B	Tenma	X-ray astronomy
14 February 1984	EXOS-C	Ohzora	Mesosphere observation
8 January 1985	MS-T5	Sakigake	Technology experiment / Comet observation
19 August 1985	PLANET-A	Suisei	Comet observation
19 August 1987	ASTRO-C	Ginga	X-ray astronomy
22 February 1989	EXOS-D	Akebono	Aurora observation
24 January 1990	MUSES-A	Hiten	Lunar flyby / Interplanetary technology experiment
30 August 1991	SOLAR-A	Yohkoh	Solar X-ray observation (with NASA / UK)
24 July 1992	GEOTAIL	GEOTAIL	Magnetosphere observation (with NASA)
20 February 1993	ASTRO-D	ASCA	X-ray astronomy (with NASA)
18 March 1995	SFU	SFU	Multi-purpose experiment flyer (with NASDA / NEDO / USEF)
12 February 1997	MUSES-B	HALCA	Space VLBI technology development
4 July 1998	PLANET-B	Nozomi	Mars atmosphere observation
9 May 2003	MUSES-C	Hayabusa	Planetary sample return technology development

=== After establishment of JAXA ===
Launch date	Name before launch	Name after launch	Mission
10 July 2005	ASTRO-EII	Suzaku	X-ray astronomy
24 August 2005	INDEX	Reimei	Technology / Aurora research
21 February 2006	ASTRO-F	Akari	Infrared astronomy
22 September 2006	SOLAR-B	Hinode	Solar observation
14 September 2007	SELENE	Kaguya	Lunar orbiter
20 May 2010	PLANET-C	Akatsuki	Venus atmosphere observation
20 May 2010	IKAROS	IKAROS	Solar sail demonstration
14 September 2013	SPRINT-A	Hisaki	EUV observation
3 December 2014	Hayabusa2	Hayabusa2	Asteroid sample return
17 February 2016	ASTRO-H	Hitomi	X-ray astronomy
20 December 2016	ERG	Arase	Magnetosphere research
20 October 2018	MMO	Mio	Exploration of Mercury as part of the BepiColombo mission with ESA
16 November 2022	OMOTENASHI	OMOTENASHI	Lunar landing experiment
14 April 2023	Juice	Juice	Ganymede exploration (with ESA / NASA)
6 September 2023	XRISM	XRISM	X-ray astronomy
6 September 2023	SLIM	SLIM	Lunar landing demonstration
7 October 2024	Hera	Hera	Asteroid observation (with ESA)

=== Future missions ===
Planned launch date	Name	Mission
2026	Roman Space Telescope	Infrared astronomy (with NASA)
2026	MMX	Phobos sample return
July 2028	Dragonfly	Titan atmosphere probe (with NASA)
July 2028	Solar-C	Solar observation
2028	DESTINY^{+}	Near Earth objects multi-flyby
2028	Ramses	Asteroid flyby (with ESA)
2028	OPENS-0	Saturn ring observation
2029	Comet Interceptor Probe B1	Asteroid flyby (with ESA)
2030-3033	NGSR	small Solar System body sample return
2032	JASMINE	Infrared astrometry
2036	LiteBIRD	CMB astronomy
2037	ATHENA	X-ray astronomy (with ESA / NASA)

== See also ==
- Comet Interceptor, a Europe-led mission with contributions from ISAS
- HIMES
- Lunar Polar Exploration Mission, a future lunar lander
- PROCYON and EQUULEUS, deep space probes developed with University of Tokyo
- Reusable Vehicle Testing
- SELENE-2
