= Tenma =

Japanese space observatory (1983–1988)

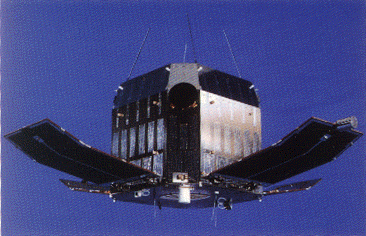
- Tenma (Japanese for "Pegasus")
- Names: ASTRO-B
- Mission type: X-ray astronomy
- Operator: ISAS
- COSPAR ID: 1983-011A
- SATCAT no.: 13829
- Mission duration: 5 years, 9 months, 27 days

Spacecraft properties
- Launch mass: 216 kg (476 lb)
- Dimensions: 0.94 m × 0.895 m (3.08 ft × 2.94 ft)

Start of mission
- Launch date: 20 February 1983, 05:10 UTC
- Rocket: M-3S
- Launch site: Kagoshima Space Center

End of mission
- Disposal: Decommissioned
- Last contact: 17 December 1988
- Decay date: 19 January 1989

Orbital parameters
- Reference system: Geocentric
- Regime: Low Earth
- Perigee altitude: 489 km (304 mi)
- Apogee altitude: 503 km (313 mi)
- Inclination: 31.5°
- Period: 94 minutes
Instruments
- GSPC: Gas Scintillation Proportional Counter
- XFC: X-ray Focusing Collector
- HXT: Hadamard X-ray Telescope

Tenma, known as ASTRO-B before launch, was a Japanese X-ray astronomy satellite developed by the Institute of Space and Astronautical Science. It was launched on 20 February 1983, it studied celestial X-ray sources and contributed to research on iron emission and absorption features. Battery failure in 1984 limited its operations, and the satellite re-entered Earth's atmosphere in January 1989. (Note: Tenma was the third Japanese X-ray observatory launched, as CORSA-A was lost in a launch failure in 1976.)

== History ==
It was launched on 20 February 1983. Battery failure in July 1984 caused the operation to become limited, and continuing problems lead to the termination of X-ray observation on 11 November 1985, however it remained in sporadic contact until 17 December 1988. It reentered the atmosphere on 19 January 1989. (Note: The NORAD catalog considers Tenma's decay date occurred on 17 December 1988.)

== Instruments ==
Tenma was the eighth scientific satellite of ISAS. It was spin-stabilized, and the fields of view of its instruments were mostly aligned with the spin axis. Its primary instrument was the Gas Scintillation Proportional Counter (GSPC), made up of ten counters of 80 cm² each that covered the 2–60 keV range. The counters were divided into three groups: SPC-A and SPC-B with four counters each (fields of view of 3.1° and 2.5° FWHM) and SPC-C with two counters (3.8°). The GSPC had an energy resolution of 9.5% at 6 keV. Tenma also carried an X-ray Focusing Collector, with two units of 7 cm² each, to observe very soft X-rays in the 0.1–2 keV range. A transient source monitor, consisting of a Hadamard X-ray telescope and a scanning counter, covered 2–10 keV. Two sets of scintillation counters monitored background variations, served as alarms for the satellite's entry into the radiation belts, and detected gamma-ray bursts.
