= Uchinoura Space Center =

Japanese Spaceport

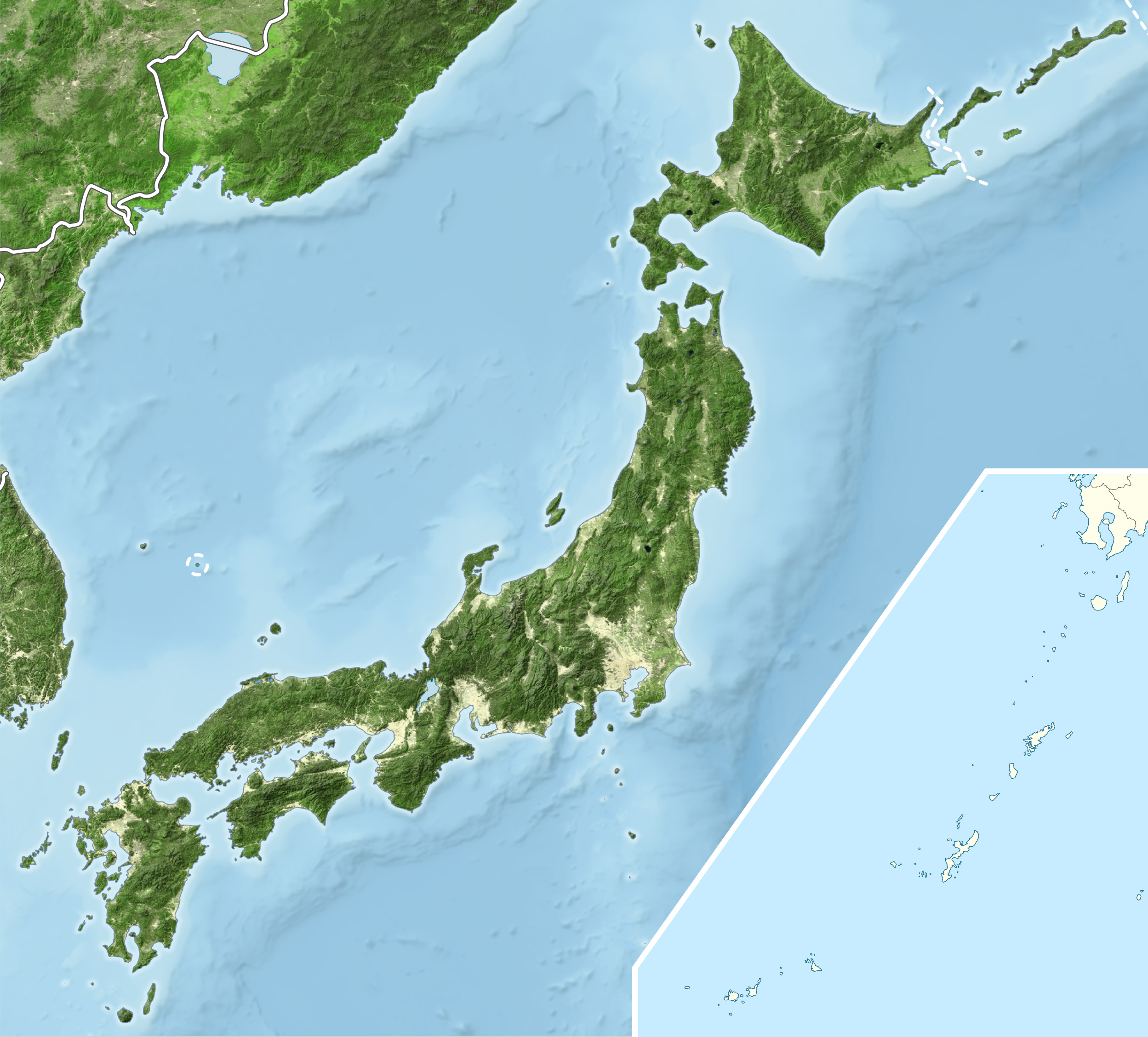
Location of the Uchinoura Space Center

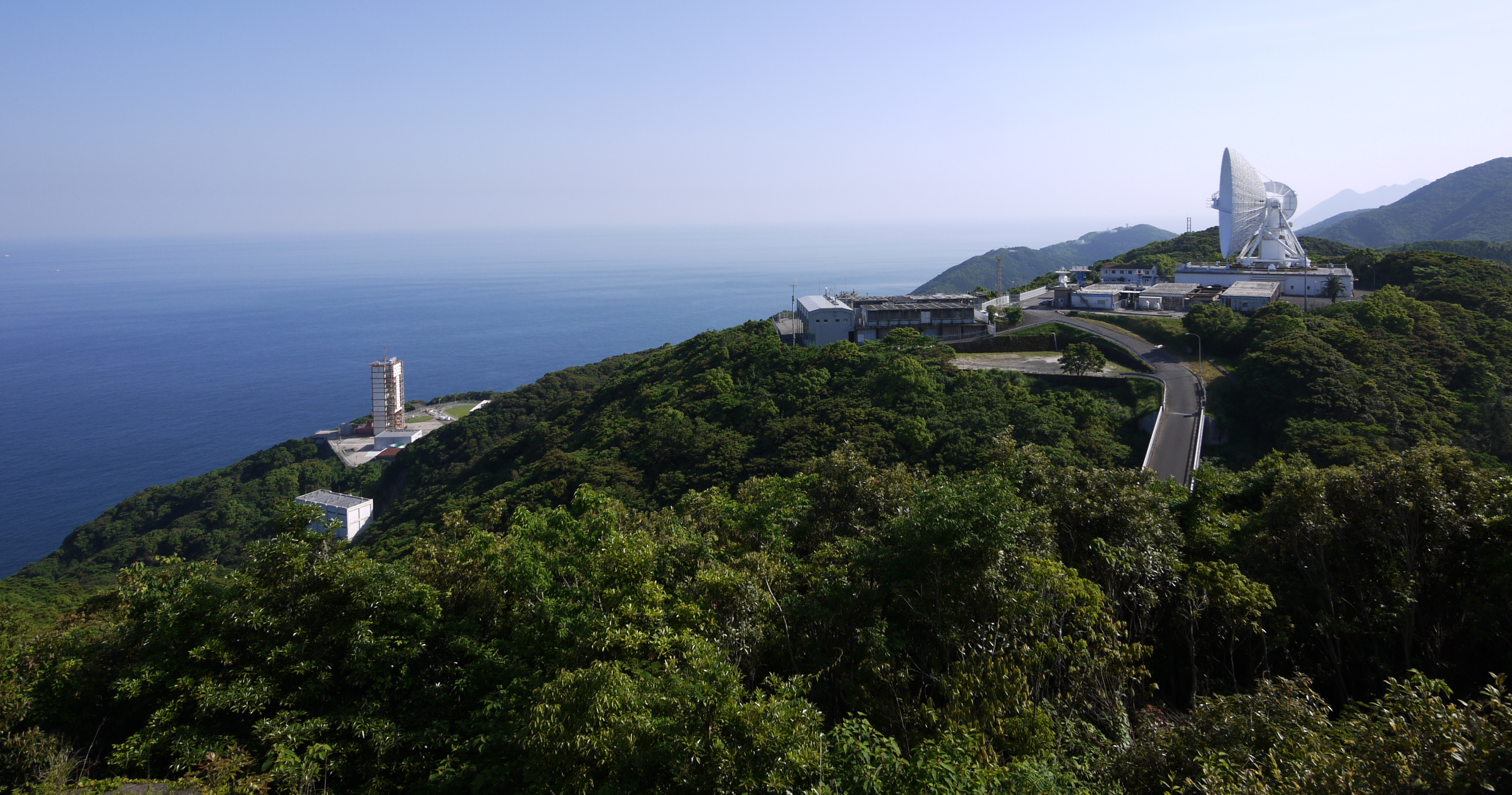
Overview of Uchinoura Space Center: main launch pad on the left, and one of the parabolic antennas on the right.

The Uchinoura Space Center (内之浦宇宙空間観測所, Uchinoura Uchū Kūkan Kansokusho) is a space launch facility in the Japanese town of Kimotsuki, Kagoshima Prefecture. Before the establishment of the JAXA space agency in 2003, it was simply called the Kagoshima Space Center (鹿児島宇宙空間観測所) (KSC). All of Japan's scientific satellites were launched from Uchinoura prior to the M-V launch vehicles being decommissioned in 2006. It continues to be used for suborbital launches, stratospheric balloons and has also been used for the Epsilon orbital launch vehicle. Additionally, the center has antennas for communication with interplanetary space probes.

== History ==
Established in February 1962, the Kagoshima Space Center (KSC) was constructed on the Pacific coast of Kagoshima Prefecture in Uchinoura (now part of Kimotsuki) for the purpose of launching large rockets with probe payloads. Prior to establishment of KSC, test launches of the Pencil Rocket, Baby Rocket and Kappa Rocket had been performed at the pioneering Akita rocket test facility (Michikawa) from the mid-1950s to the 1960s. However, progress in rocket development and larger launch vehicles required a site with more expansive down range than the narrow Sea of Japan. After consideration of various candidate sites, Uchinoura in Kagoshima Prefecture, fronting the Pacific Ocean, was selected. At 31° 15' north latitude and 131° 05' east longitude, and situated in hilly terrain, the site at first glance does not appear to be exceptional; however, landscape engineering resulted in a launch facility which maximizes the unique terrain features of the site.

Subsequent to the so-called Baby Rocket, launch vehicles developed by Japan have been given names from the Greek alphabet, i.e. Alpha, Beta, Kappa, Omega, Lambda, and Mu. Although some Greek letters have been skipped due to project termination, the progression to Mu has been one of larger and more sophisticated rockets.

Launch test efforts at KSC with regard to the Kappa, Lambda and Lambda-4 rockets set the stage for small satellite missions. At the same time, the Mu program of large rockets was pursued. After four launch failures, an engineering test satellite was successfully put into orbit aboard a Lambda 4S-5 rocket. The satellite Ohsumi (named after a peninsula in Kagoshima Prefecture) marked Japan's first successful satellite launch. Subsequent improvements in the Mu class rocket enabled scientific satellite launches at a rate of one per year. Development of the new generation M-V rocket resulted in successful launch of the scientific satellite MUSES-B (HALCA) in February 1997.

The first launch of the Epsilon rocket, of a small scientific satellite SPRINT-A, was performed at 14:00 JST, 14 September 2013.

=== Launch pads ===
- Kappa Pad - 31.2523°N 131.0785°E
- Lambda Pad - 31.2523°N 131.0785°E
- Mu Pad - 31.2510°N 131.0813°E
- M-V Pad - 31.2510°N 131.0820°E
- Temporary pad - 31.2527°N 131.0754°E
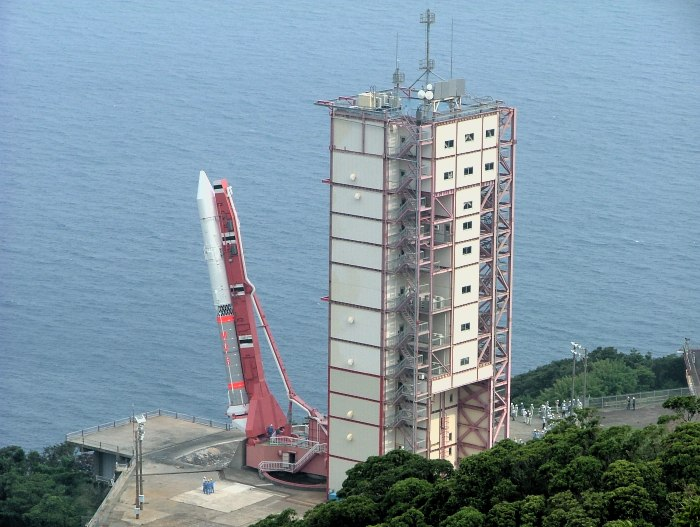
M-V pad with M-V-6 ( ASTRO-E2)

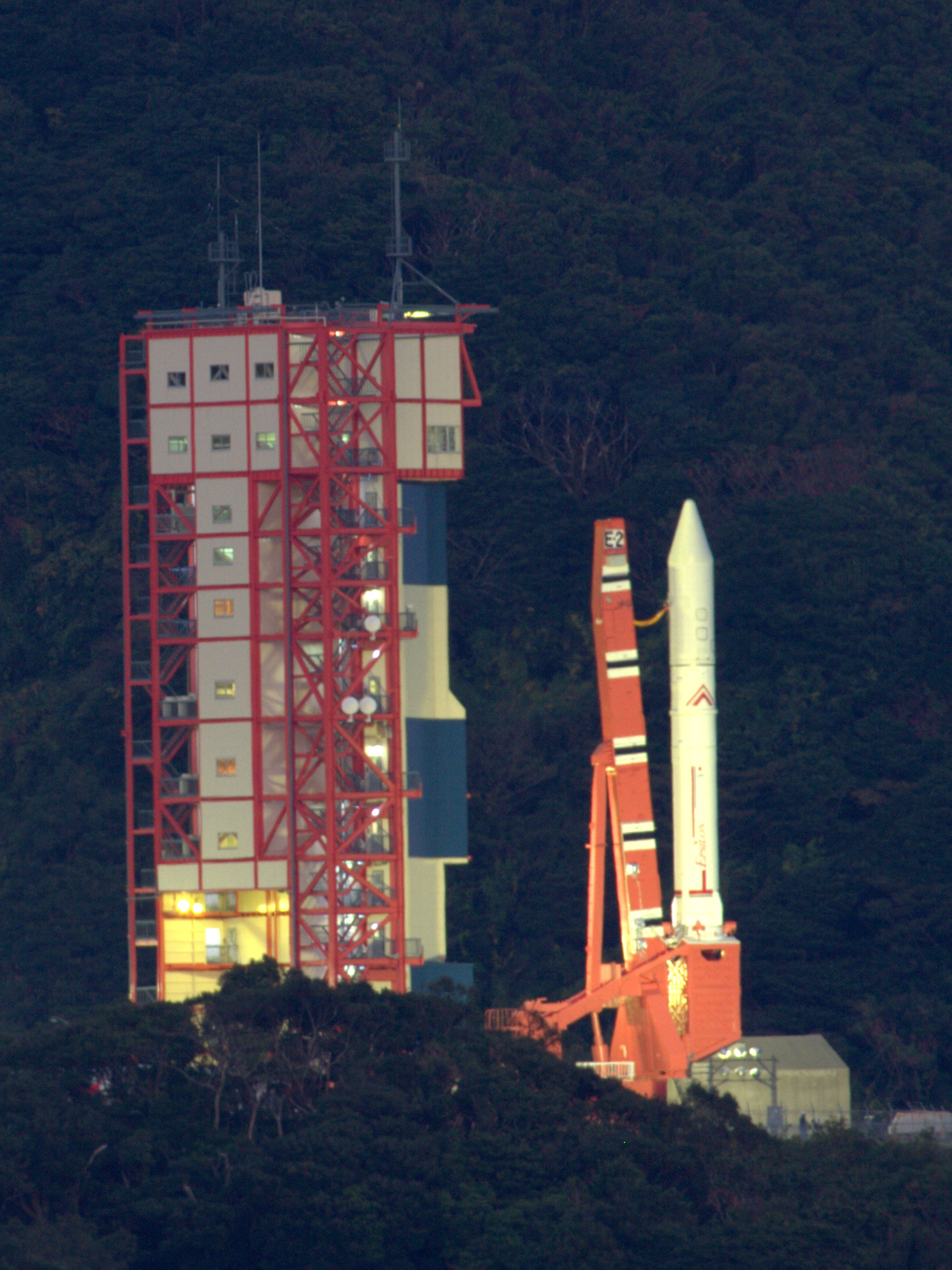
M-V pad with Epsilon-2 (ERG)

== See also ==
- Tanegashima Space Center – Rocket-launch complex in Japan
