= MINERVA (spacecraft) =

Series of asteroid rovers by JAXA

MINERVA (MIcro-Nano Experimental Robot Vehicle for Asteroid) are a series of rovers developed by the Japanese space agency JAXA for the purpose of exploring asteroid surfaces. The first MINERVA was part of the Hayabusa mission, while MINERVA-II was a series of three rovers for its successor, Hayabusa2. On 12 November 2005, MINERVA was deployed from Hayabusa with the aim of landing on asteroid 25143 Itokawa. However, the landing failed as MINERVA missed the asteroid and ended up in a heliocentric orbit. On 21 September 2018, two MINERVA-II rovers successfully landed on asteroid 162173 Ryugu. The third MINERVA-II rover malfunctioned before it could be deployed, but was released anyway on 2 October 2019 to perform gravitational measurements before impacting the asteroid a few days later.

== Overview ==
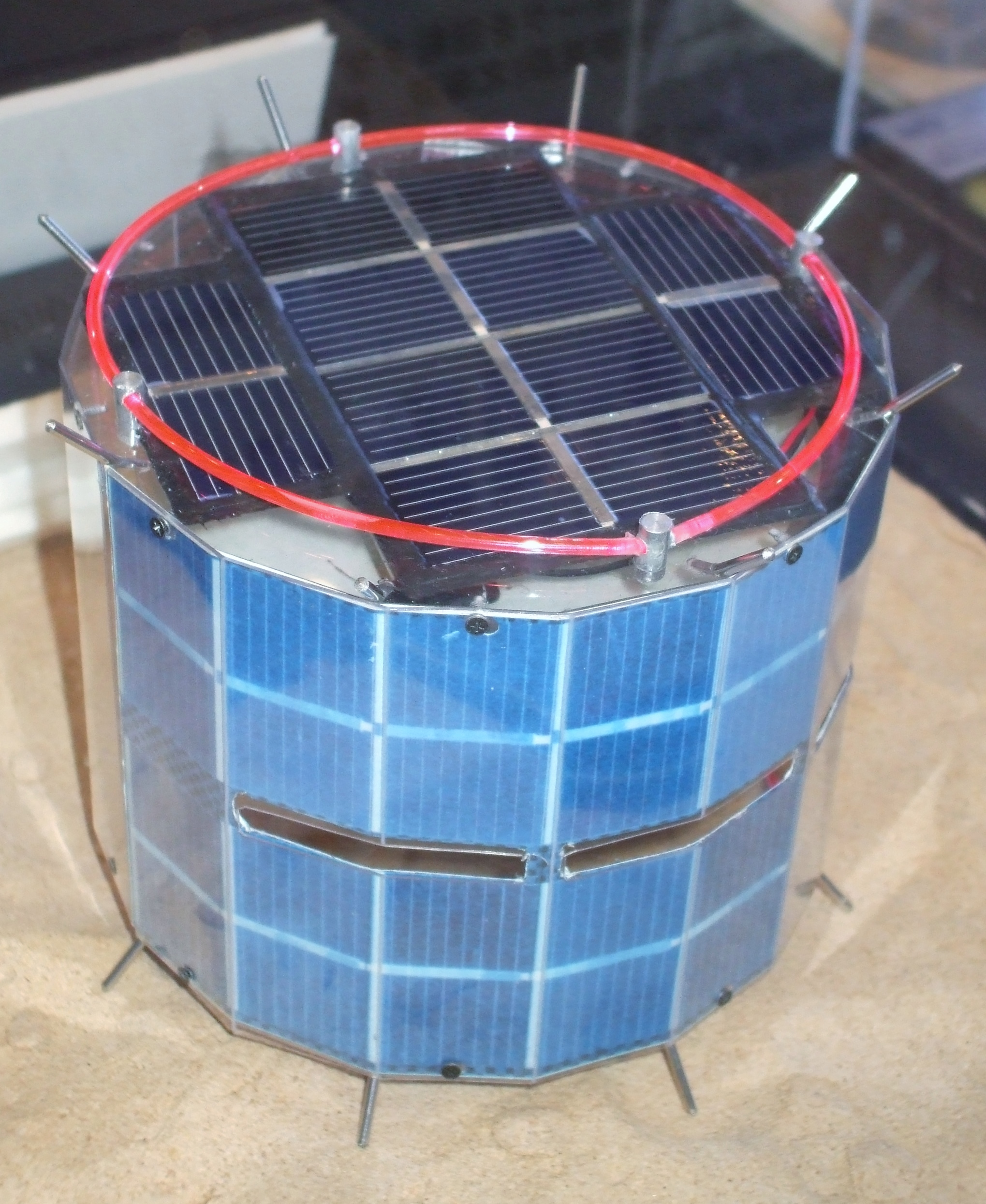
Model of MINERVA. Photo taken at JAXA Sagamihara Campus.

Following the approval of the asteroid sample-return project MUSES-C, a rover was proposed to be mounted on the asteroid explorer, and development of MINERVA began in 1997. Completed in February 2003, MINERVA was Japan's first space rover, and the first asteroid rover in the world.

On 9 May 2003, the MUSES-C spacecraft carrying MINERVA was launched from Kagoshima Space Center, and was named Hayabusa. Hayabusa arrived at its target, asteroid 25143 Itokawa, on 12 September 2005. After a two-month long observation phase, Hayabusa began descent rehearsals in preparation for its asteroid landings. On 12 November, MINERVA was separated from Hayabusa and headed for Itokawa, but the drop failed and thus MINERVA became the smallest artificial object in heliocentric orbit. Following separation MINERVA continued to communicate for 18 hours, transmitting data to its mothership.

After Hayabusa's return to Earth, a successor project, Hayabusa2, began, which also included a rover. While MINERVA was treated as an optional addition in the first Hayabusa, MINERVA-II became part of the nominal payload for Hayabusa2. Launched on 3 December 2014, Hayabusa2 arrived at asteroid 162173 Ryugu on 27 June 2018. MINERVA-II-1, composed of two identical rovers, was deployed from Hayabusa2 in 21 September. Both rovers reached Ryugu's surface, and became the first probes ever to travel the surface of an asteroid. JAXA announced that the rovers have been named HIBOU (previously Rover-1A) and OWL (previously Rover-1B), respectively. Hibou [i.bu] is the French word for 'owl'.

The second rover deployment for MINERVA-II-2 happened 2 October 2019 16:38 UTC. The rover, known as Rover-2 or MINERVA-II-2 failed before deployment, but was released from the Hayabusa2 orbiter anyway to perform gravitational measurements. It impacted the asteroid a few days after release on 8 October.

== Design ==
=== MINERVA ===
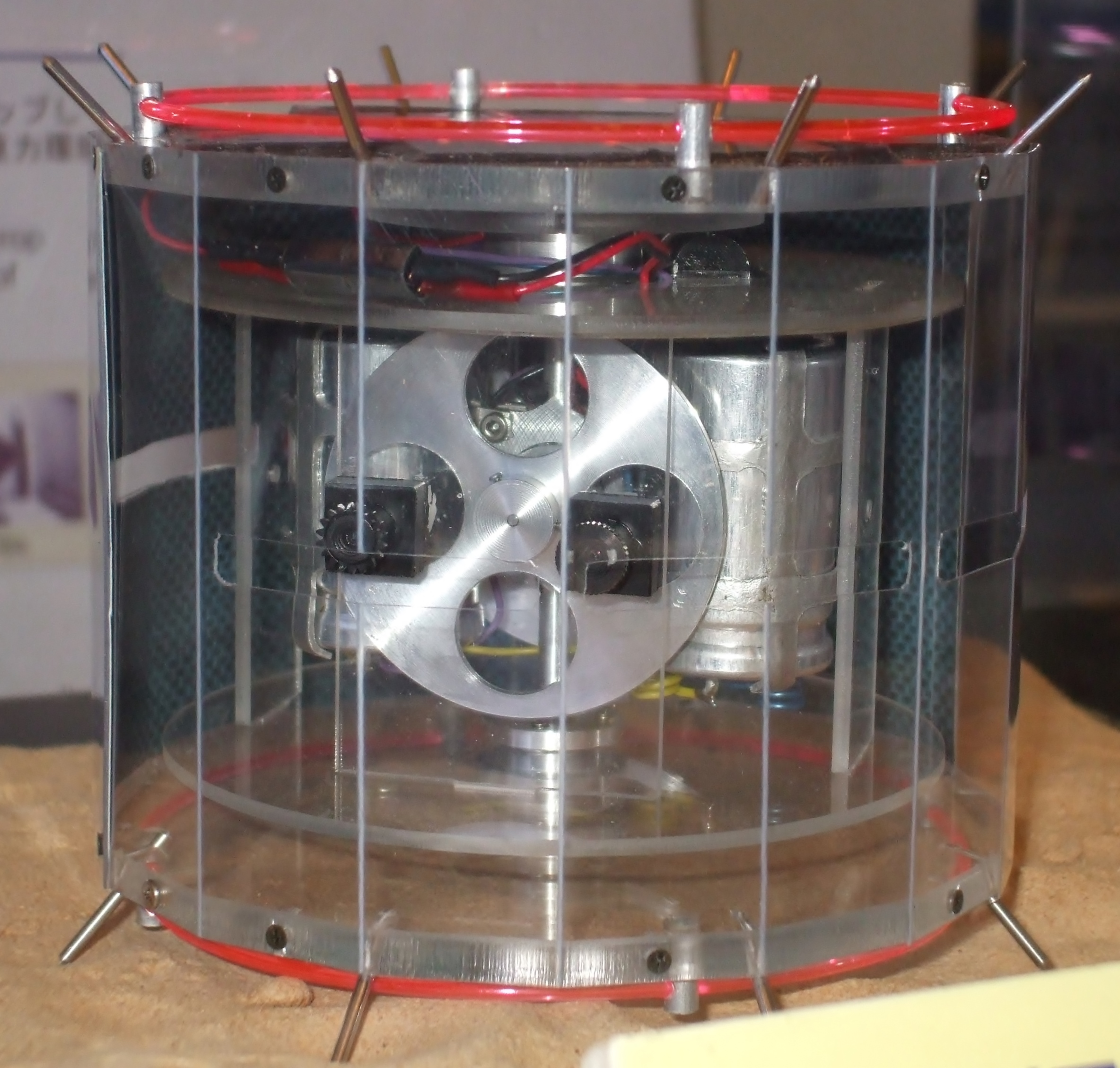
Model of MINERVA's internal structure, taken at JAXA Sagamihara Campus. The electric double-layer capacitor and the stereo cameras for closeup imaging are visible.

MINERVA consists of five components, including the rover's body.

- OME-B, which mounts MINERVA to MUSES-C, and supplies power to MINERVA until its separation
- OME-C, the cover between OME-B and MUSES-C
- OME-E, the repeater between the mothership's data bus
- OME-Ant, a flat patch antenna for OME-E to communicate with MINERVA

These four components were inside the rover.

MINERVA itself is a hexadecagonal prism with a diameter of 12 cm and a height of 10 cm, with solar cells attached to each side. This allows the probe to secure power in any attitude as long as it was in a sunlit environment. For shock mitigation during landing and to protect the solar cells, 16 pins are protruding from MINERVA's surface. Six among them had thermometers inside them to directly measure the asteroid's ground temperature. The pins also functioned as a means to increase friction during the hops.

Power is supplied from the solar cells attached to every side of MINERVA. Surplus power gets stored in an electric double-layer capacitor, and is used in situations that requires greater power than what gets generated by the solar cells, such as rotating the motor and when using the cameras. After the electric double-layer capacitor ceases function, communication will still be possible but the rover will be unable to make further hops or imaging, so an operation was considered to have a stationary MINERVA continuously measure the asteroid surface temperature of its final resting place.

Along with six built-in temperature sensors at the pins sticking out from the main body, MINERVA had three cameras and six photodiodes on board as external sensors. The three CCD cameras were identical; two of them faced the same direction and were adjacent with each other, enabling closeup stereographic imaging. This was intended for mainly shooting the asteroid surface. The remaining camera was placed on the opposite side of the two cameras, with the primary purpose of imaging the asteroid from above during the hops.

On MINERVA's topside and underside an antenna is located. As the rover's attitude shifts, the either side facing Hayabusa was to be used. The communication speed between MINERVA and OME-E was 9.6 kbps, with a maximum range of 20 km.

MINERVA has an on-board microcomputer. Its main CPU microprocessor is Hitachi's SH-3, clocked at 10 MHz, adopted for its low power consumption, performance efficiency and reliability. The computer's memory includes 2 MB RAM, 512 KB ROM, and 2 MB Flash ROM.

=== MINERVA-II-1 ===
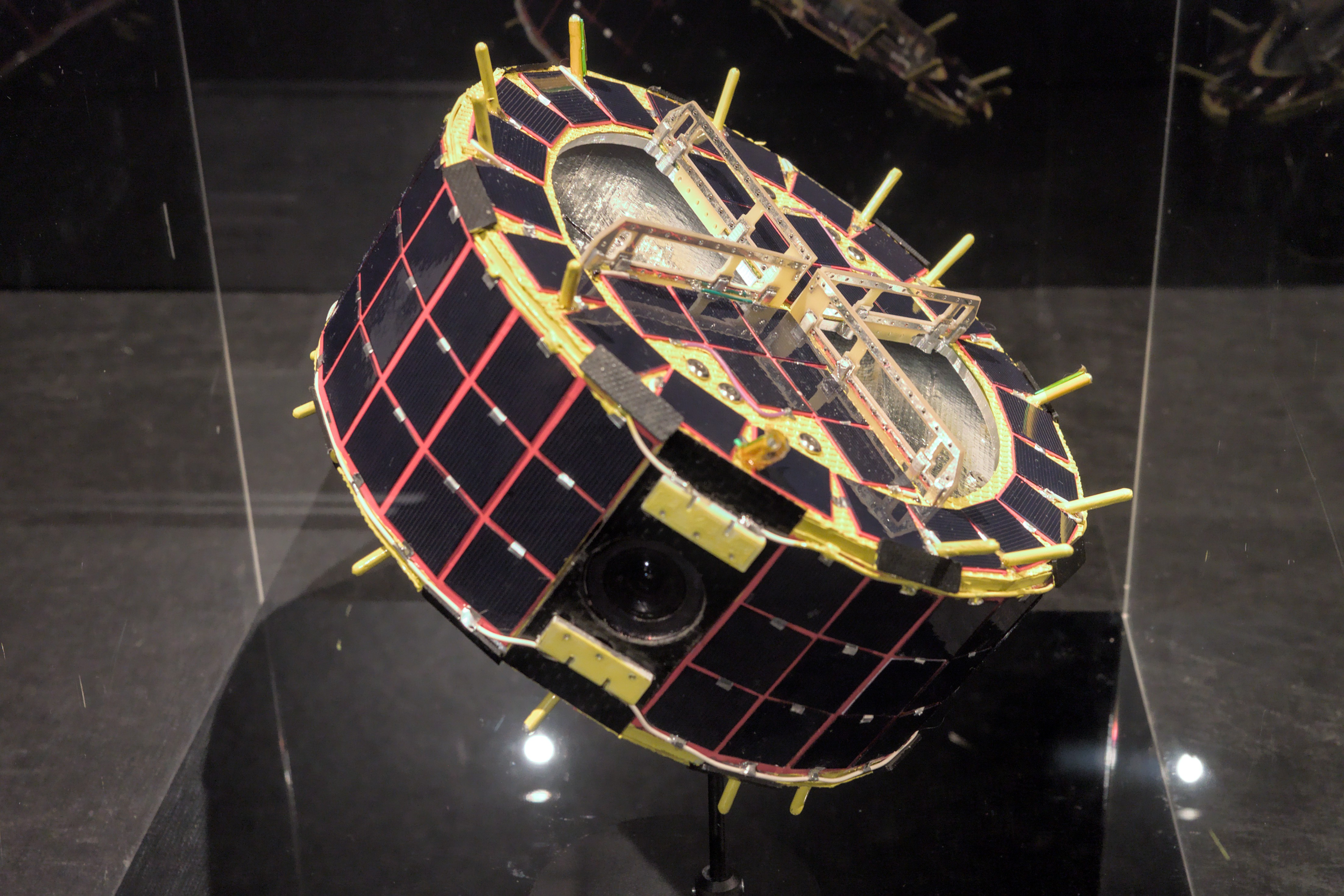
Model of MINERVA-II-1 Rover 1B

MINERVA-II-1 was developed by JAXA and the University of Aizu. It has a slim design compared to its predecessor, to increase the likelihood the surface with larger area would contact the asteroid surface. MINERVA-II-1 was enlarged from its predecessor as the rover's destination, asteroid Ryugu was more distant from the Sun than Itokawa, necessitating an increase in solar cell area. Ryugu's greater size compared to Itokawa means rovers will face stronger gravity, thus larger DC motors are used for MINERVA-II-1. By deploying two rovers simultaneously, a network of space probes can be achieved. The maximum communication speed between the MINERVA-II-1 rovers and the mothership's OME-E is 32 kbps. The two rovers are nearly identical, the only difference being some internal sensors and the thermal characteristics. Rover-1A uses a traditional multi-layer insulation, which covers the rover to prevent heat from entering, while Rover-1B is equipped with radiators to dissipate heat to the outside.

=== MINERVA-II-2 ===
Unlike the other three MINERVAs (one on Hayabusa, two on Hayabusa2) developed by JAXA/ISAS, MINERVA-II-2 was developed by a consortium of Japanese universities, and employs significantly different methods of mobility. MINERVA-II-2's primary goal is to verify navigation in an environment with extremely small gravitational acceleration. The rover was realized as an 'outreach payload', aimed at the university community. The responsibility of each universities are the following:

- Tohoku University was responsible for overall management of Rover-2, and developed a micro-hop type moving mechanism using micro vibrations
- Yamagata University developed an environmentally driven moving mechanism using bimetals
- Tokyo Denki University developed an internal impact type moving mechanism utilizing permanent magnets
- Osaka University developed an elastic energy-releasing type moving mechanism using leaf springs
- Tokyo University of Science developed the rover's on board cameras

== Operation and landing ==
=== MINERVA (Hayabusa) ===
MINERVA was deployed by Hayabusa during the third landing rehearsal. On 12 November 2005 6:07:38 UTC the command to deploy MINERVA was sent from Earth. However, before the MINERVA deployment command, a command instructing Hayabusa to raise its altitude was accidentally sent. MINERVA was deployed on 6:24 UTC, but the distance to 25143 Itokawa was 200 m, and Hayabusa was ascending at approximately 15 cm/s away from the asteroid. An image taken by Hayabusa 212 s after MINERVA's deployment caught both MINERVA and OME-C, the rover's cover that was also deployed.

Of the images taken by MINERVA, only one was sent, which was a photograph of Hayabusa's solar panels. After separating from Hayabusa communication with MINERVA lasted for 18 hours.

=== MINERVA-II (Hayabusa2) ===
Hayabusa2 arrived at asteroid 162173 Ryugu on 27 July 2018. The spacecraft released MINERVA-II-1, a batch of 2 rovers, over the 'northern hemisphere' of Ryugu. The process was conducted fully autonomously, a countermeasure to prevent the recurrence of the error that doomed their predecessor. The landing site of MINERVA-II-1 rovers was named Tritonis. Of the two rovers, HIBOU (aka Rover-1A) took an image of Hayabusa2 soon after deployment. OWL (aka Rover-1B) succeeded in recording a video from Ryugu. MINERVA-II-1 became the first probes to take an image, and move on an asteroid surface. After completing their missions, the two rovers will remain on the asteroid surface.

==== MINERVA-II-2 ====
The MINERVA-II-2 rover, also called Rover-2, failed before deployment. It was however deployed 2 October 2019 on orbit around Ryugu to perform gravitational measurements. After release from Hayabusa2 it impacted the asteroid on 8 October.

== See also ==
- MASCOT
- MMX rover
- Philae
