= Hayabusa =

Japanese probe to asteroid and sample return (2003–2010)

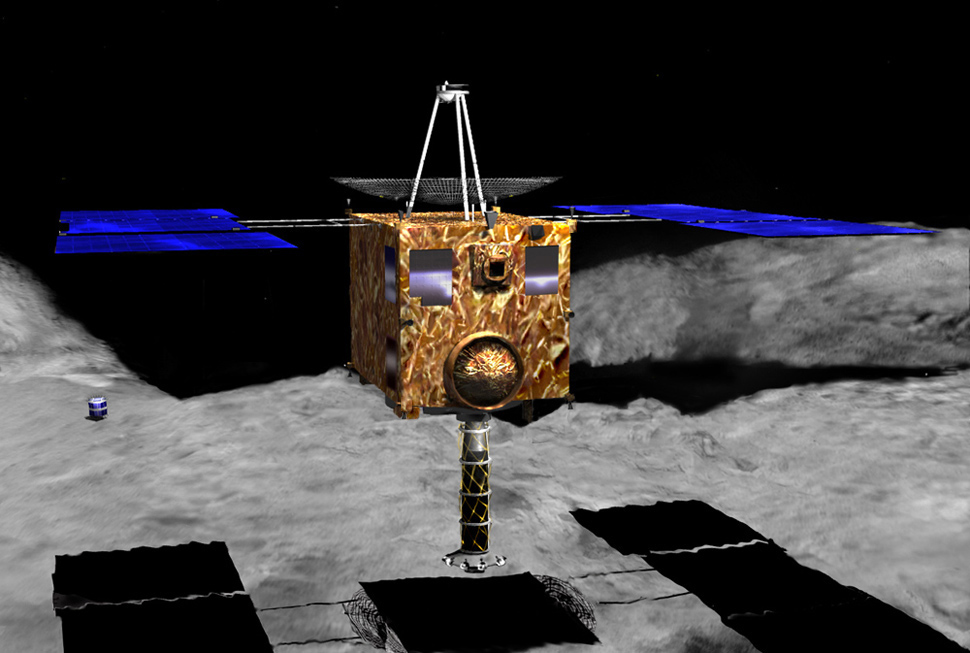
- An artist's rendering of Hayabusa above Itokawa's surface
- Names: Muses-C (before launch)
- Mission type: sample return
- Operator: JAXA
- COSPAR ID: 2003-019A
- SATCAT no.: 27809
- Mission duration: 7 years, 1 month and 4 days

Spacecraft properties
- Launch mass: 510 kg
- Dry mass: 380 kg (840 lb)

Start of mission
- Launch date: 04:29:25, 9 May 2003 (UTC)
- Rocket: M-V
- Launch site: Uchinoura Space Center

End of mission
- Disposal: sample return capsule: recovered spacecraft: ballistic reentry Minerva and rover: lost contact
- Last contact: Minerva: 12 November 2005
- Recovery date: sample capsule: 07:08, 14 June 2010
- Decay date: spacecraft: 13 June 2010
- Landing date: sample capsule: 13 June 2010 14:12 UT
- Landing site: near Woomera, Australia

Flyby of Earth
- Closest approach: 06:23, 19 May 2004
- Distance: 3,725 km (2,315 mi)

Rendezvous with (25143) Itokawa
- Arrival date: 12 September 2005, 1:17 UTC
- Departure date: December 2005

(25143) Itokawa lander
- Landing date: 19 November 2005, 21:30 UTC
- Return launch: 19 November 2005, 21:58 UTC

(25143) Itokawa lander
- Landing date: 25 November 2005
- Sample mass: <1g
Instruments
- AMICA: Asteroid Multiband Imaging Camera
- LIDAR: Light Detection and Ranging Instrument
- NIRS: Near-Infrared Spectrometer
- XRS: X-Ray Fluorescence Spectrometer

Hayabusa (Japanese: はやぶさ; "Peregrine falcon") was a robotic spacecraft developed by the Japan Aerospace Exploration Agency (JAXA) to return a sample of material from a small near-Earth asteroid named 25143 Itokawa to Earth for further analysis. Hayabusa, formerly known as MUSES-C for Mu Space Engineering Spacecraft C, was launched on 9 May 2003 and rendezvoused with Itokawa in mid-September 2005. After arriving at Itokawa, Hayabusa studied the asteroid's shape, spin, topography, color, composition, density, and history. In November 2005, it landed on the asteroid and collected samples in the form of tiny grains of asteroidal material, which were returned to Earth aboard the spacecraft on 13 June 2010.

The spacecraft also carried a detachable minilander, MINERVA, which failed to reach the surface.

== Mission firsts ==
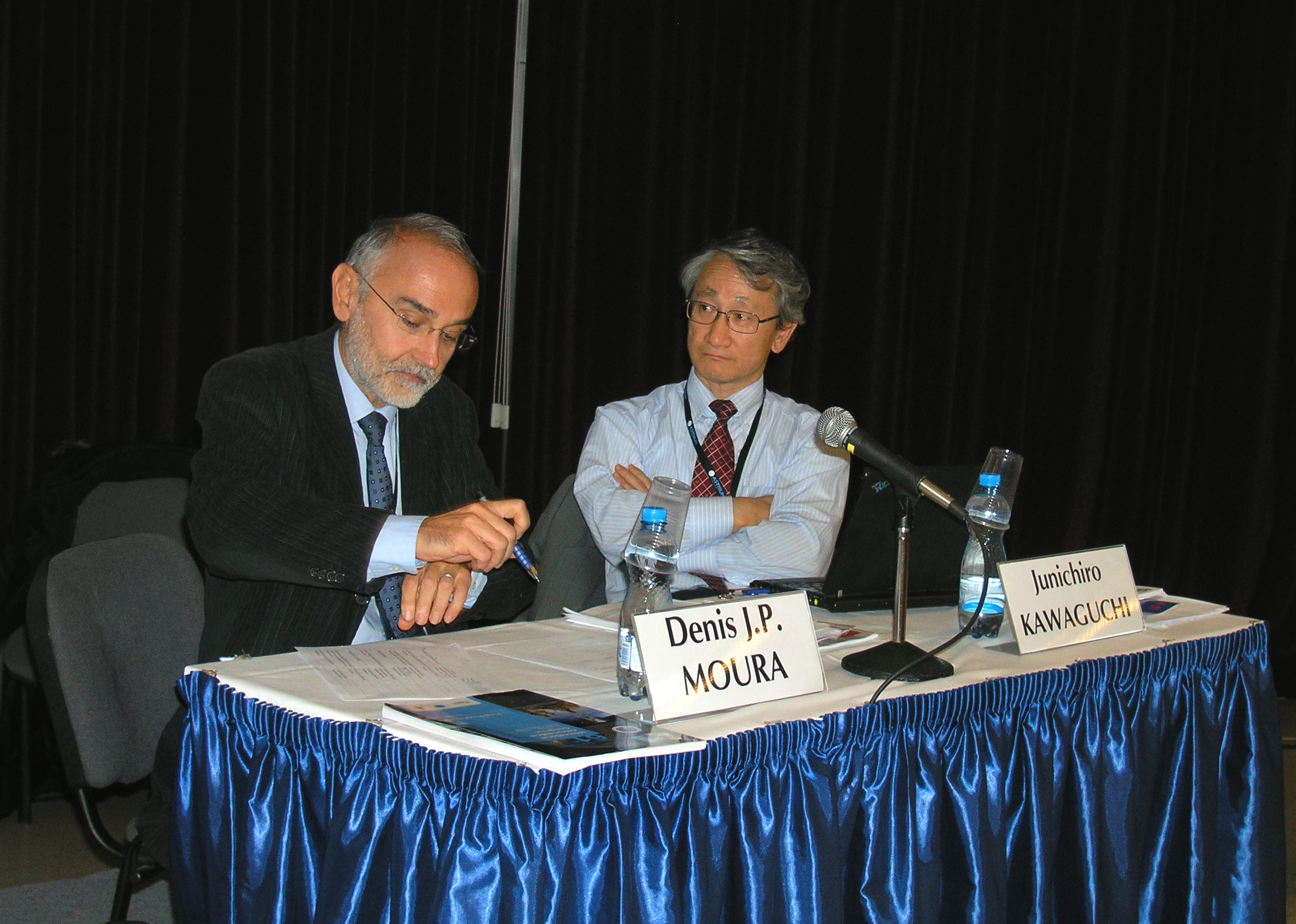
Denis J. P. Moura (left) and Junichiro Kawaguchi (right) at the 2010 International Astronautical Congress (IAC)

NASA's Galileo and NEAR Shoemaker spacecraft had visited asteroids before, but the Hayabusa mission was the first one to return an asteroid sample to Earth for analysis.

Hayabusa was the first spacecraft designed to deliberately land on an asteroid and then take off again (NEAR Shoemaker made a controlled descent to the surface of 433 Eros in 2000, but it was not designed as a lander and was eventually deactivated after it arrived). Technically, Hayabusa was not designed to "land"; it simply touches the surface with its sample capturing device and then moves away. However, it was the first craft designed from the outset to make physical contact with the surface of an asteroid. Junichiro Kawaguchi of the Institute of Space and Astronautical Science was appointed to be the leader of the mission.

Despite its designer's intention for momentary contact, Hayabusa landed and sat on the asteroid surface for about 30 minutes (see below).

== Mission profile ==
The Hayabusa spacecraft was launched on 9 May 2003 at 04:29:25 UTC on an M-V rocket from the Uchinoura Space Center (still called Kagoshima Space Center at that time). Following launch, the spacecraft's name was changed from the original MUSES-C to Hayabusa, the Japanese word for falcon. The spacecraft's xenon ion engines (four separate units), operating near-continuously for two years, slowly moved Hayabusa toward a September 2005 rendezvous with Itokawa. As it arrived, the spacecraft did not go into orbit around the asteroid, but remained in a station-keeping heliocentric orbit close by.

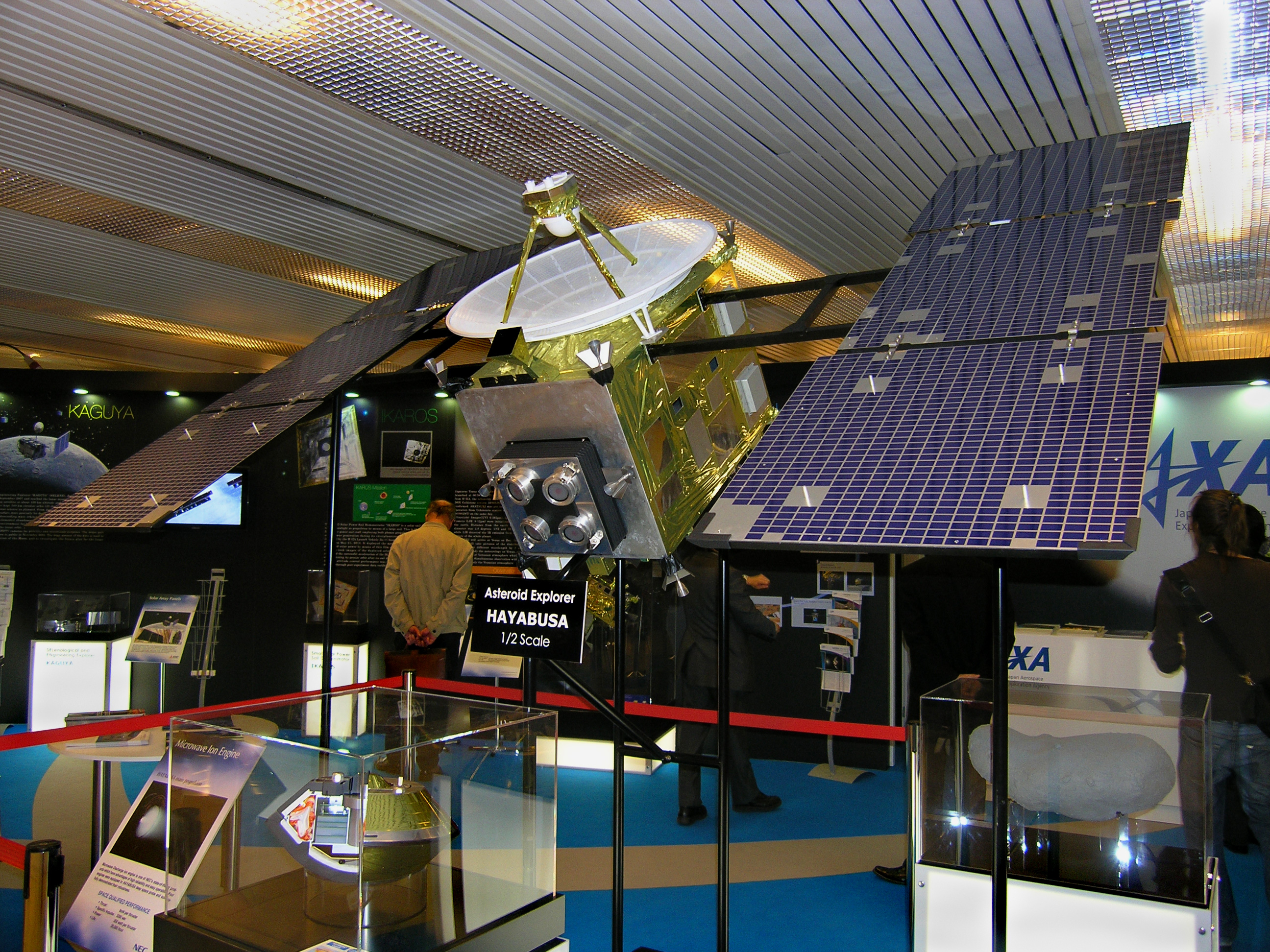
The half-scale model of Hayabusa at the IAC in 2010

Hayabusa surveyed the asteroid surface from a distance of about 20 km (12 mi), the "gate position". After this the spacecraft moved closer to the surface (the "home position"), and then approached the asteroid for a series of soft landings and for the collection of samples at a safe site. Autonomous optical navigation was employed extensively during this period because the long communication delay prohibits Earth-based real-time commanding. At the instant Hayabusa touched down with its deployable collection horn, the spacecraft was programmed to fire tiny projectiles at the surface and then collect the resulting spray. Some tiny specks were collected by the spacecraft for return to Earth and analysis.

After a few months in proximity to the asteroid, the spacecraft was scheduled to fire its engines to begin its cruise back to Earth. This maneuver was delayed due to problems with attitude control (orientation) and the thrusters of the craft. Once it was on its return trajectory, the re-entry capsule was released from the main spacecraft three hours before reentry, and the capsule coasted on a ballistic trajectory, re-entering the Earth's atmosphere at 13:51, 13 June 2010 UTC. It is estimated that the capsule experienced peak deceleration of about 25 G and heating rates approximately 30 times those experienced by the Apollo spacecraft. It landed via parachute near Woomera, Australia.

In relation to the mission profile, JAXA defined the following success criteria and corresponding scores for major milestones in the mission prior to the launch of the Hayabusa spacecraft. As it shows, the Hayabusa spacecraft is a platform for testing new technology and the primary objective of the Hayabusa project is the world's first implementation of microwave discharge ion engines. Hence 'operation of ion engines for more than 1000 hours' is an achievement that gives a full score of 100 points, and the rest of the milestones are a series of world's first-time experiments built on it.

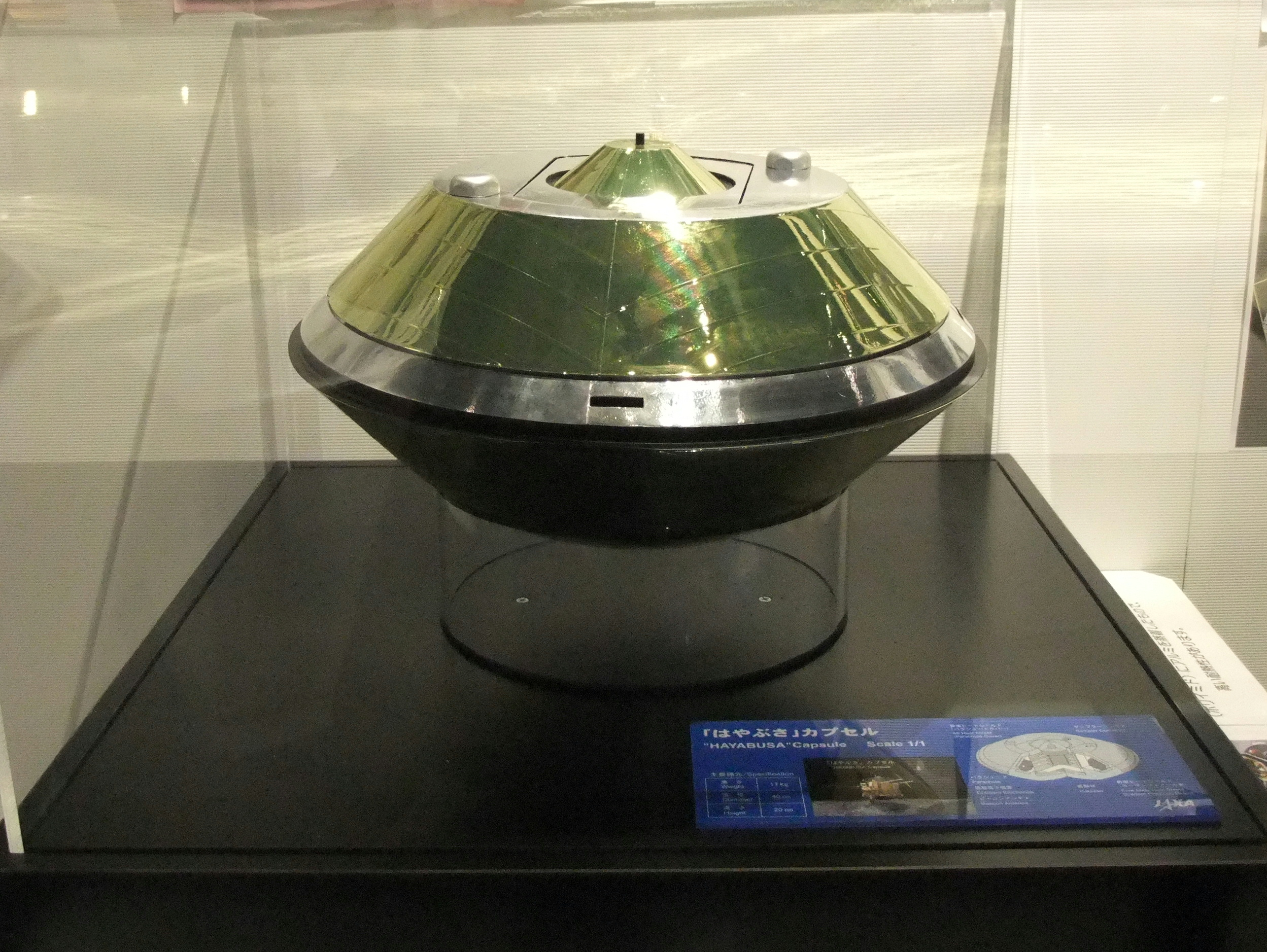
The replica of the re-entry capsule exhibited at JAXAi (closed on 28 December 2010)

Success criteria for Hayabusa	Points	Status
Operation of ion engines	50 points	Success
Operation of ion engines for more than 1000 hours	100 points	Success
Earth gravity assist with ion engines	150 points	Success
Rendezvous with Itokawa with autonomous navigation	200 points	Success
Scientific observation of Itokawa	250 points	Success
Touch-down and sample collection	275 points	Success
Capsule recovered	400 points	Success
Sample obtained for analysis	500 points	Success

== MINERVA mini-lander ==
Hayabusa carried a tiny mini-lander (weighing only 591 g (20.8 oz), and approximately 10 cm (3.9 in) tall by 12 cm (4.7 in) in diameter) named "MINERVA" (short for MIcro-Nano Experimental Robot Vehicle for the Asteroid). An error during deployment resulted in the craft's failure.

This solar-powered vehicle was designed to take advantage of Itokawa's very low gravity by using an internal flywheel assembly to hop across the surface of the asteroid, relaying images from its cameras to Hayabusa whenever the two spacecraft were in sight of one another.

MINERVA was deployed on 12 November 2005. The lander release command was sent from Earth, but before the command could arrive, Hayabusa's altimeter measured its distance from Itokawa to be 44 m (144 ft) and thus started an automatic altitude keeping sequence. As a result, when the MINERVA release command arrived, MINERVA was released while the probe was ascending and at a higher altitude than intended, so that it escaped Itokawa's gravitational pull and tumbled into space.

Had it been successful, MINERVA would have been the first hopping space rover. The Soviet mission Phobos 2 also encountered a malfunction while attempting to deploy a hopping rover.

== Scientific and engineering importance of the mission ==
Scientists' understanding of asteroids depends greatly on meteorite samples, but it is very difficult to match up meteorite samples with the exact asteroids from which they came. Hayabusa helped solve this problem by bringing back pristine samples from a specific, well-characterized asteroid. Hayabusa bridged the gap between ground observation data of asteroids and laboratory analysis of meteorite and cosmic dust collections. Also comparing the data from the onboard instruments of the Hayabusa with the data from the NEAR Shoemaker mission will put the knowledge on a wider level.

== Changes in mission plan ==
The Hayabusa mission profile was modified several times, both before and after launch.

- The spacecraft was originally intended to launch in July 2002 to the asteroid 4660 Nereus (the asteroid (10302) 1989 ML was considered as an alternative target). However, a July 2000 failure of Japan's M-5 rocket forced a delay in the launch, putting both Nereus and 1989 ML out of reach. As a result, the target asteroid was changed to 1998 SF_{36}, which was soon thereafter named for Japanese rocket pioneer Hideo Itokawa.
- Hayabusa was to deploy a small rover supplied by NASA and developed by JPL, called Muses-CN, onto the surface of the asteroid, but the rover was canceled by NASA in November 2000 due to budget constraints.
- In 2002, launch was postponed from December 2002 to May 2003 to recheck the O-rings of its reaction control system since one of them had been found to be using a different material than specified.
- In 2003, while Hayabusa was en route to Itokawa, the largest solar flare recorded in history damaged the solar cells aboard the spacecraft. This reduction in electrical power reduced the efficiency of the ion engines, thus delaying the arrival at Itokawa from June to September 2005. Since orbital mechanics dictated that the spacecraft still had to leave the asteroid by November 2005, the amount of time it was able to spend at Itokawa was greatly reduced and the number of landings on the asteroid was reduced from three to two.
- In 2005, two reaction wheels that govern the attitude movement of Hayabusa failed; the X-axis wheel failed on 31 July, and the Y-axis on 2 October. After the latter failure, the spacecraft was still able to turn on its X and Y axes with its thrusters. JAXA claimed that since global mapping of Itokawa had been completed, this was not a major problem, but the mission plan was altered. The failed reaction wheels were manufactured by Ithaco Space Systems, Inc, New York, which was later acquired by Goodrich Company.
- The 4 November 2005, 'rehearsal' landing on Itokawa failed, and was rescheduled.
- The original decision to sample two different sites on the asteroid was changed when one of the sites, Woomera Desert, was found to be too rocky for a safe landing.
- The 12 November 2005, release of the MINERVA miniprobe ended in failure.

== Mission timeline ==
=== Up to the launch ===
The asteroid exploration mission by the Institute of Space and Astronautical Science (ISAS) originated in 1986–1987 when the scientists investigated the feasibility of a sample return mission to Anteros and concluded that the technology was not yet developed. Between 1987 and 1994, joint ISAS / NASA group studied several missions: an asteroid rendezvous mission later became NEAR, and a comet sample return mission later became Stardust.

In 1995, ISAS selected asteroid sample return as an engineering demonstration mission, MUSES-C, and the MUSES-C project started in fiscal year 1996. Asteroid Nereus was the first choice of target, 1989 ML was the secondary choice. In early development phase, Nereus was considered out of reach and 1989 ML became the primary target. A launch failure of M-V in July 2000 forced MUSES-C's launch to be delayed from July 2002 to November/December, putting both Nereus and 1989 ML out of reach. As a result, the target asteroid was changed to 1998 SF_{36}. In 2002, launch was postponed from December 2002 to May 2003 to recheck O-rings of reaction control system since one of it was found using different material than specified. On 9 May 2003 04:29:25 UTC, MUSES-C was launched by an M-V rocket, and the probe was named "Hayabusa".

=== Cruising ===
Ion thruster checkout started on 27 May 2003. Full power operation started on 25 June.

Asteroids are named by their discoverer. ISAS asked LINEAR, the discoverer of 1998 SF_{36}, to offer the name after Hideo Itokawa, and on 6 August, Minor Planet Circular reported that the target asteroid 1998 SF_{36} was named Itokawa.

In October 2003, ISAS and two other national aerospace agencies in Japan were merged to form JAXA.

On 31 March 2004, ion thruster operation was stopped to prepare for the Earth swing-by. Last maneuver operation before swing-by on 12 May. On 19 May, Hayabusa performed a Earth swing-by. On 27 May, ion thruster operation was started again.

On 18 February 2005, Hayabusa passed aphelion at 1.7 AU. On 31 July, the X-axis reaction wheel failed. On 14 August, Hayabusa's first image of Itokawa was released. The picture was taken by the star tracker and shows a point of light, believed to be the asteroid, moving across the starfield. Other images were taken from 22 to 24 August. On 28 August, Hayabusa was switched over from the ion engines to the bi-propellant thrusters for orbital maneuvering. From 4 September, Hayabusa's cameras were able to confirm Itokawa's elongated shape. From 11 September, individual hills were discerned on the asteroid. On 12 September, Hayabusa was 20 km (12 mi) from Itokawa and JAXA scientists announced that Hayabusa had officially "arrived".

=== In proximity of Itokawa ===
On 15 September 2005, a 'color' image of the asteroid was released (which is, however, grey in coloring). On 4 October, JAXA announced that the spacecraft had successfully moved to its 'Home Position' 7 km from Itokawa. Closeup pictures were released. It was also announced that the spacecraft's second reaction wheel, governing the Y-axis, had failed, and that the craft was now being pointed by its rotation thrusters. On 3 November, Hayabusa took station 3.0 km from Itokawa. It then began its descent, planned to include delivery of a target marker, and release of the Minerva minilander. The descent went well initially, and navigation images with wide-angle cameras were obtained. However, at 01:50 UTC (10:50 am JST) on 4 November, it was announced that due to a detection of an anomalous signal at the Go/NoGo decision, the descent, including release of Minerva and the target marker had been canceled. The project manager, Junichiro Kawaguchi, explained that the optical navigation system was not tracking the asteroid very well, probably caused by the complex shape of Itokawa. A delay of a few days was required to evaluate the situation and reschedule.

On 7 November, Hayabusa was 7.5 km from Itokawa. On 9 November, Hayabusa performed a descent to 70 m to test the landing navigation and the laser altimeter. After that, Hayabusa backed off to a higher position, then descended again to 500 m and released one of the target markers into space to test the craft's ability to track it (this was confirmed). From analysis of the closeup images, the Woomera Desert site (Point B) was found to be too rocky to be suitable for landing. The Muses Sea site (Point A) was selected as the landing site, for both first and, if possible, second landings.

On 12 November, Hayabusa closed in to 55 m from the asteroid's surface. MINERVA was released but due to an error failed to reach the surface. On 19 November, Hayabusa landed on the asteroid. There was considerable confusion during and after the maneuver about precisely what had happened, because the high-gain antenna of the probe could not be used during final phase of touch-down, as well as the blackout during handover of ground station antenna from DSN to Usuda station. It was initially reported that Hayabusa had stopped at approximately 10 meters from the surface, hovering for 30 minutes for unknown reasons. Ground control sent a command to abort and ascend, and by the time the communication was regained, the probe had moved 100 km away from the asteroid. The probe had entered into a safe mode, slowly spinning to stabilize attitude control. However, after regaining control and communication with the probe, the data from the landing attempt were downloaded and analyzed, and on 23 November, JAXA announced that the probe had indeed landed on the asteroid's surface. Unfortunately, the sampling sequence was not triggered since a sensor detected an obstacle during descent; the probe tried to abort the landing, but since its orientation was not appropriate for ascent, it chose instead a safe descent mode. This mode did not permit a sample to be taken, but there is a high probability that some dust may have whirled up into the sampling horn when it touched the asteroid, so the sample canister attached to the sampling horn was sealed.

On 25 November, a second touchdown attempt was performed. It was initially thought that this time, the sampling device was activated; however, later analysis decided that this was probably another failure and that no pellets were fired. Due to a leak in the thruster system, the probe was put in a "safe hold mode".

On 27 November, the probe experienced a power outage when trying to reorient the spacecraft, probably due to a fuel leakage. On 30 November, JAXA announced that control and communication with Hayabusa had been restored, but a problem remained with the craft's reaction control system, perhaps involving a frozen pipe. Mission control was working to resolve the problem before the craft's upcoming launch window for return to Earth. On 2 December, an attitude (orientation) correction was attempted, but the thruster did not generate enough force. On 3 December, the probe's Z-axis was found to be 20 to 30 degrees from the Sun direction and increasing. On 4 December, as an emergency measure, xenon propellant from the ion engines was blown to correct the spin, and it was confirmed successful. On 5 December, attitude control was corrected enough to regain communication through the medium gain antenna. Telemetry was obtained and analyzed. As the result of telemetry analysis, it was found that there was a strong possibility that the sampler projectile had not penetrated when it landed on 25 November. Due to the power outage, the telemetry log data was faulty. On 6 December, Hayabusa was 550 km from Itokawa. JAXA held a press conference about the situation so far.

On 8 December, a sudden orientation change was observed, and communication with Hayabusa was lost. It was thought likely that the turbulence was caused by evaporation of 8 or 10cc of leaked fuel. This forced a wait of a month or two for Hayabusa to stabilize by conversion of precession to pure rotation, after which the rotation axis needed to be directed toward the Sun and Earth within a specific angular range. The probability of achieving this was estimated at 60% by December 2006, 70% by spring 2007.

=== Recovery and return to Earth ===
Animation of Hayabusa's trajectory returning from Itokawa to Earth. Hayabusa Itokawa · Earth · Sun

On 7 March 2006, JAXA announced that communication with Hayabusa had been recovered in the following stages: On 23 January, the beacon signal from the probe was detected. On 26 January, the probe responded to commands from ground control by changing the beacon signal. On 6 February, an ejection of xenon propellant was commanded for attitude control to improve communication. The spin axis change rate was about two degrees per day. On 25 February, telemetry data was obtained through the low-gain antenna. On 4 March, telemetry data was obtained through the medium-gain antenna. On 6 March, Hayabusa's position was established at about 13,000 km ahead of Itokawa in its orbit with a relative speed of 3 m per second.

On 1 June, Hayabusa project manager Junichiro Kawaguchi reported that they confirmed two out of four ion engines were working normally, which would have been sufficient for the return journey. On 30 January 2007, JAXA reported that 7 out of 11 batteries were working and the return capsule was sealed. On 25 April, JAXA reported that Hayabusa started the return journey. On 29 August, it was announced that Ion Engine C onboard Hayabusa, in addition to B and D, had been successfully re-ignited. On 29 October, JAXA reported that the first phase of trajectory maneuver operation had finished and the spacecraft was now put in a spin-stabilized state. On 4 February 2009, JAXA reported success in reignition of the ion engines and starting the second phase of the trajectory correction maneuver to return to Earth. On 4 November 2009, the ion engine D automatically stopped working due to an anomaly from degradation.

On 19 November 2009, JAXA announced that they managed to combine the ion generator of ion engine B and the neutralizer of ion engine A. It was suboptimal but expected to be sufficient to generate the necessary delta-v. Out of 2,200 m/s delta-v necessary to return to the Earth, about 2,000 m/s had been performed already, and about 200 m/s were still necessary. On 5 March 2010, Hayabusa was on a trajectory that would have passed within the lunar orbit. Ion engine operation was suspended to measure the precise trajectory in preparation to perform Trajectory Correction Maneuver 1 to the Earth-rim trajectory. On 27 March, 06:17 UTC, Hayabusa was on a trajectory which would pass 20,000 km from Earth center, completing the orbit transfer operation from Itokawa to Earth. By 6 April, the first stage of Trajectory Correction Maneuver (TCM-0) which led to a rough Earth rim trajectory was completed. It was planned to be 60 days until reentry. By 4 May, the probe completed its TCM-1 maneuver to align precisely to the Earth rim trajectory. On 22 May, TCM-2 started, continued for about 92.5 hours, and finished on 26 May. It was followed by TCM-3 from 3 through 5 June to change the trajectory from the Earth rim to Woomera, South Australia, TCM-4 was performed on 9 June for about 2.5 hours for a precision descent to Woomera Prohibited Area.

The reentry capsule was released at 10:51 UTC on 13 June.

=== Reentry and capsule retrieval ===
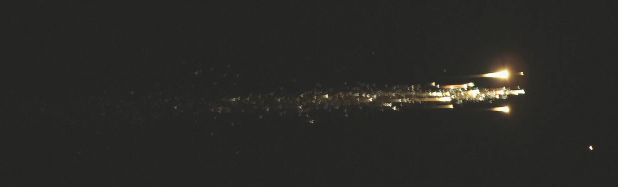
The glowing return capsule is seen forward of and below the parent Hayabusa probe bus as the latter breaks up.

The reentry capsule and the spacecraft reentered Earth's atmosphere on 13 June 2010 at 13:51 UTC (23:21 local). The heat-shielded capsule made a parachute landing in the South Australian outback while the spacecraft broke up and incinerated in a large fireball.

An international team of scientists observed the 12.2 km/s entry of the capsule from 11.9 kilometres (39,000 feet) on board NASA's DC-8 airborne laboratory, using a wide array of imaging and spectrographic cameras to measure the physical conditions during atmospheric reentry in a mission led by NASA's Ames Research Center, with Peter Jenniskens of the SETI Institute as the project scientist.

Since the reaction control system no longer functioned, the 510 kilograms (1,120 lb) space probe re-entered the Earth's atmosphere similar to the approach of an asteroid along with the sample re-entry capsule, and, as mission scientists expected, the majority of the spacecraft disintegrated upon entry.

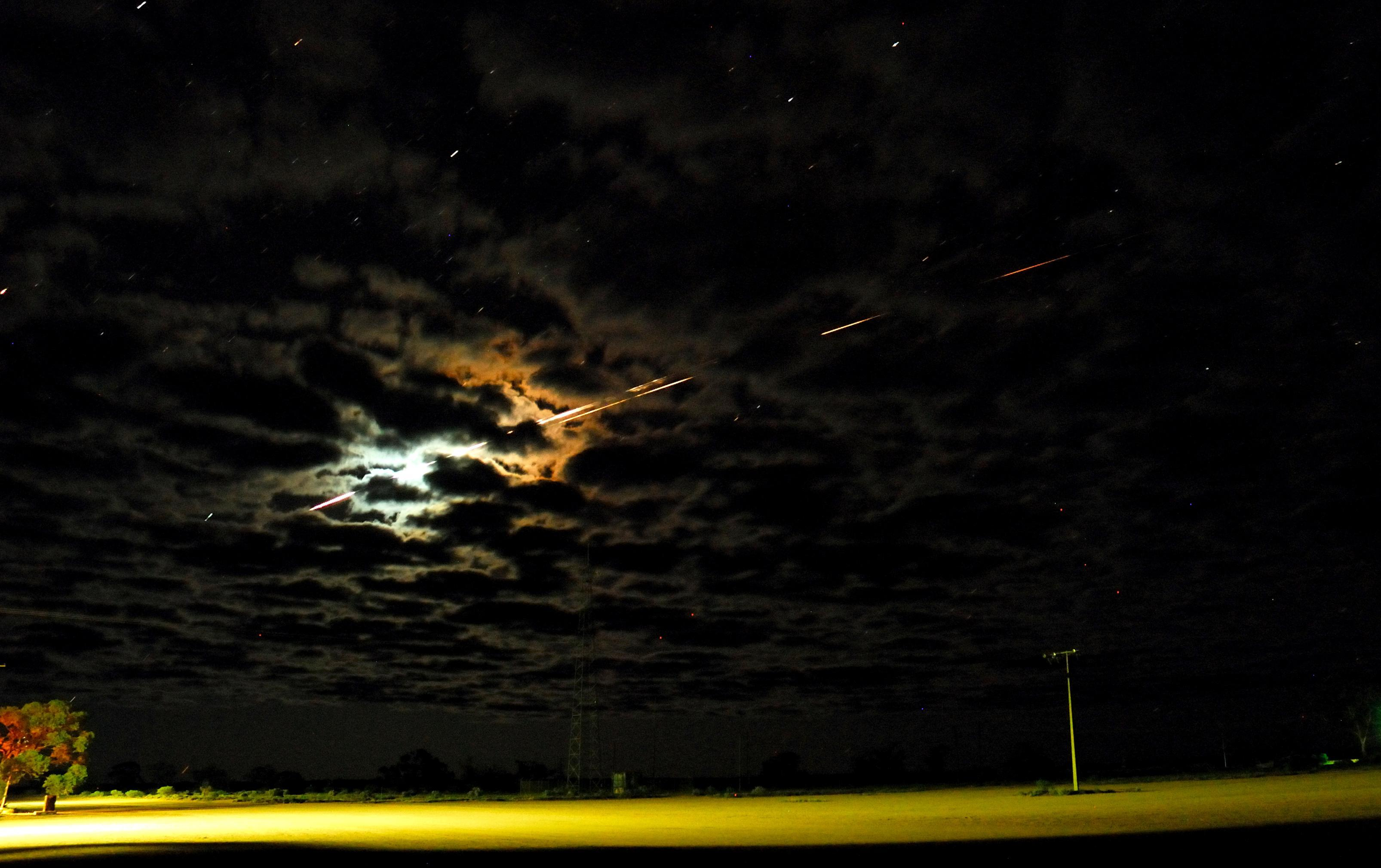
The re-entry seen from the Woomera Test Range

The return capsule was predicted to land in a 20 km by 200 km area in the Woomera Prohibited Area, South Australia. Four ground teams surrounded this area and located the re-entry capsule by optical observation and a radio beacon. Then a team on board a helicopter was dispatched. They located the capsule and recorded its position with GPS. The capsule was successfully retrieved at 07:08 UTC (16:38 local) of 14 June 2010. The two parts of the heat shield, which were jettisoned during the descent, were also found.

Hayabusa re-entry filmed by a camera onboard NASA's DC-8 Airborne Laboratory. The glowing return capsule is seen forward of and below the main Hayabusa probe bus as the latter breaks up. The heat-shielded capsule continues leaving a wake after the main bus fragments have faded. (Close-up video)

After confirming that the explosive devices used for parachute deployment were safe, the capsule was packed inside a double layer of plastic bags filled with pure nitrogen gas to reduce the risk of contamination. The soil at the landing site was also sampled for reference in case of contamination. Then the capsule was put inside a cargo container which had air suspension to keep the capsule below 1.5 G shock during transportation. The capsule and its heat shield parts were transported to Japan by a chartered plane and arrived at the curation facility at the JAXA/ISAS Sagamihara Campus on 18 June.

A Tokyo Metropolitan Government adviser and former lieutenant general, Toshiyuki Shikata, claimed that part of the rationale for the reentry and landing part of the mission was to demonstrate "that Japan's ballistic missile capability is credible."

== Scientific study of samples ==
Before the capsule was extracted from the protecting plastic bag, it was inspected using X-ray CT to determine its condition. Then the sample canister was extracted from the reentry capsule. The surface of the canister was cleaned using pure nitrogen gas and carbon dioxide; it was then placed in the canister opening device. The internal pressure of the canister was determined by a slight deformation of the canister as the pressure of the environment nitrogen gas in the clean chamber was varied. The nitrogen gas pressure was then adjusted to match the internal canister pressure to prevent the escape of any gas from the sample upon the opening of the canister.

=== Confirmation of asteroid particles ===
On 16 November 2010, JAXA confirmed that most of the particles found in one of two compartments inside the Hayabusa sample return capsule came from Itokawa. Analysis with a scanning electron microscope identified about 1,500 grains of rocky particles, according to the JAXA press release. After further studying the analysis results and comparison of mineral compositions, most of them were judged to be of extraterrestrial origin, and definitely from the asteroid Itokawa.

According to Japanese scientists, the composition of Hayabusa's samples was more similar to meteorites than known rocks from Earth. Their size is mostly less than 10 micrometers. The material matches chemical maps of Itokawa from Hayabusa's remote sensing instruments. The researchers found concentrations of olivine and pyroxene in the Hayabusa samples.

Further study of the samples had to wait until 2011 because researchers were still developing special handling procedures to avoid contaminating the particles during the next phase of research.

In 2013 JAXA announced that 1500 extraterrestrial grains had been recovered, comprising the minerals olivine, pyroxene, plagioclase and iron sulfide. The grains were about 10 micrometers in size. JAXA performed detailed analyses of the samples by splitting particles and examining their crystal structure at SPring-8.

=== Results ===
The 26 August 2011 issue of Science devoted six articles to findings based on dust collected by Hayabusa. Scientists' analysis of the dust from Itokawa suggested that it had probably originally been part of a larger asteroid. Dust collected from the asteroid surface was believed to have been exposed there for about eight million years.

Dust from Itokawa was found to be "identical to material that makes up meteorites." Itokawa is an S-type asteroid whose composition matches that of an LL chondrite.

== In popular culture ==
In Japan, rival film companies announced the production of three different feature length theatrical films based on the story of Hayabusa, one of which, Hayabusa: Harukanaru Kikan (2012), starred Ken Watanabe.

The Lego construction toy company released a model of Hayabusa through their Cuusoo website.

Many references to Hayabusa appear in the Japanese series Kamen Rider Fourze, a space-themed tokusatsu series.

== See also ==
- Hayabusa2 – Japanese space mission to asteroid Ryugu
- OSIRIS-REx – NASA asteroid sample return mission (2016-2023)
- Timeline of Solar System exploration
