= NGC 1550 Group =

Galaxy group

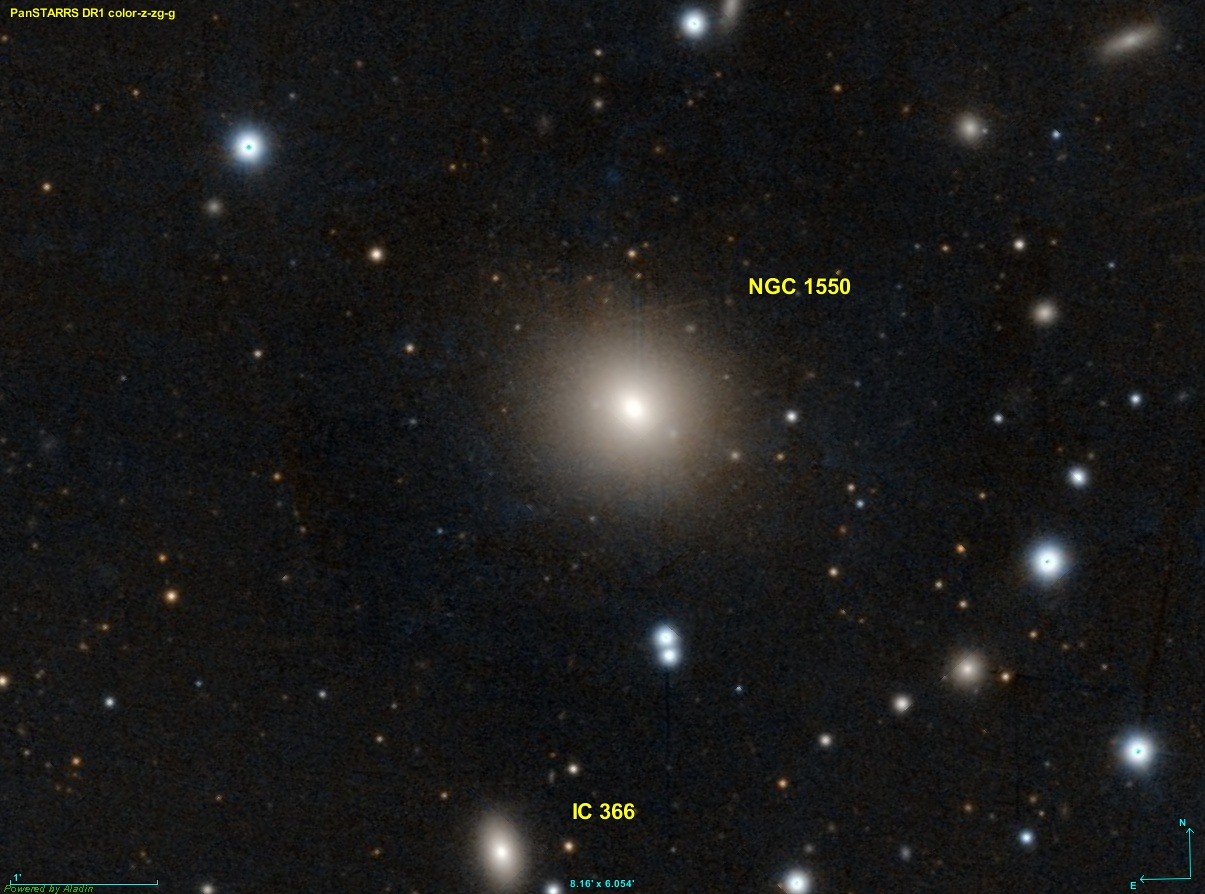
- NGC 1550 imaged by Pan-STARRS

Observation data (Epoch )
- Constellation: Taurus
- Right ascension: 04^{h} 15^{m} 27.3^{s}
- Declination: 02° 41′ 02″
- Distance: 51.4 ± 2.8 Mpc (168 ± 9 Mly)

NGC 1550 Group is a galaxy group of at least eight galaxies centred on the lenticular galaxy NGC 1550 in the constellation Taurus. It is notable for being one of the most luminous galaxy groups in X-ray light, notable for its temperature and velocity dispersion, and has been classified as a fossil group.

== Discovery and observation ==
The central galaxy NGC 1550 was discovered by William Herschel in 1785. It was later observed by Heinrich d'Arrest on 29 December 1861 and catalogued as NGC 1551 before they were recognised as the same object. The group itself is sometimes referred to in literature by the name of its dominant member or the associated X-ray source RX J0419+0225.

In 2020, observations from Chandra suggested galaxies in the NGC 1550 Group are heated by active galactic nuclei.

=== X-ray properties ===
The intragroup medium (hot gas) has a temperature of 1.37 ± 0.01 keV. Detailed Chandra observations reveal a cooling core in the central regions and an entropy profile that has been used to study nongravitational processes in galaxy groups. The group shows evidence of active galactic nucleus (AGN) feedback and gas sloshing, as revealed by combined Chandra and Giant Metrewave Radio Telescope (GMRT) data, it was previously considered relaxed, but exhibits structures indicating minor mergers or infalling material.

Suzaku observations have mapped the metal abundance distributions out to ~0.5 r_{180}, showing steeper radial gradients for magnesium, silicon, sulfur, and iron, while oxygen is nearly flat. The abundance ratios and supernova type II to type Ia ratio (approximately 2.9 in the inner regions) are consistent with those of other groups and poor clusters. XMM-Newton data support a galaxy-merger scenario in which the metals trace the total mass well, while the stellar component is more centrally concentrated.

== Members ==
The table below lists the eight galaxies in the NGC 1550 Group.

Members of the NGC 1550 Group
Name	Class.	Type	α (J2000.0)	δ (J2000.0)	Vitesse radiale (km/s)	m	Distance (Mpc)	Diameter (kal)
NGC 1542	Sab	Spiral	04^{h} 17^{m} 14.2^{s}	04° 46′ 54″	3705 ± 8	13,9	53,3 ± 3,7	94
NGC 1550	SA0^-(s)?	Lenticular	04^{h} 19^{m} 37.9^{s}	02° 24′ 34″	3718 ± 17	12,0	53,6 ± 3,8	131 (Note: See the page for this galaxy regarding the value of the diameter)
UGC 2994	SAdm?	Magellanic spiral	04^{h} 14^{m} 23.4^{s}	02° 43′ 53″	3319 ± 3	14,3	47,6 ± 3,3	78
UGC 2998	SB(rs)b	Barred spiral	04^{h} 16^{m} 34.3^{s}	02° 45′ 33″	3349 ± 6	13,1	48,1 ± 3,4	79
UGC 3002	SBcd?	Barred spiral	04^{h} 16^{m} 54.5^{s}	03° 05′ 49″	3565 ± 6	12,79	51,3 ± 3,6	60
UGC 3004	SB?	Barred spiral	04^{h} 17^{m} 19.0^{s}	02° 26′ 00″	3571 ± 5	13,7	51,4 ± 3,6	76
UGC 3010 (Note: The NASA/IPAC Extragalactic Database indicates that UGC 3010 is a field galaxy, which means it does not belong to a cluster or group and is therefore gravitationally isolated.)	SBcd?	Barred spiral	04^{h} 18^{m} 58.2^{s}	3865 ± 2	14,7	55,7 ± 3,9	62	
PGC 14744	SB(s)m	Barred magellanic spiral	04^{h} 15^{m} 20.1^{s}	00° 57′ 58″	3511 ± 4	15,4241	50,4 ± 3,5	68
