= 4C +74.26 =

Quasar in the constellation of Cepheus

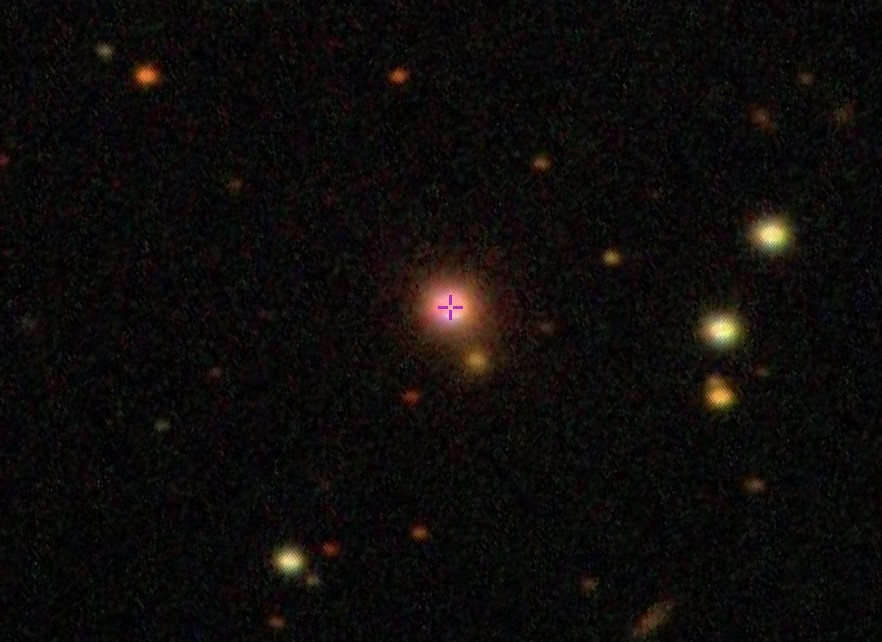
- The quasar 4C +74.26.

Observation data (J2000.0 epoch)
- Constellation: Cepheus
- Right ascension: 20^{h} 42^{m} 37.3080^{s}
- Declination: +75° 08′ 02.445″
- Redshift: 0.104000
- Heliocentric radial velocity: 31,178 km/s
- Distance: 1.293 Gly
- Apparent magnitude (V): 14.46

Characteristics
- Type: FSRQ

Other designations
- S5 2043+349, LEDA 2821908, KUV 20432+7457, INTREF 1036, QSO J2042+7508, TIC 3726873902, MAXI J2042+751

4C +74.26 is a radio-loud quasar located 1.3 billion light-years from Earth in the constellation of Cepheus with a redshift of (z) 0.104. First discovered in 1965 by the Fourth Cambridge Survey, its radio source is found to measure 1.6 megaparsecs in size, making the object the largest known source associated with an active galactic nucleus.

== Description ==
4C +74.26 is classified a broad-line radio galaxy. Its radio lobes are found to be large with two hotspots located in both northern and southern directions. While the northern hotspot has a low-surface brightness feature, the southern hotspot is found to contain an unresolved southern edge with an offset X-ray counterpart. It also contains a one-sided jet with an approximate size of 400 kiloparsecs (kpc), seen by Very-long-baseline interferometry and Very Large Array. The host galaxy of 4C +74.26 is a giant elliptical galaxy with a supermassive black hole of 4 billion M_{☉}, and a bolometric luminosity of 2 × 10^{46} erg s^{−1}.

According to an X-ray and optical study on 4C +74.26, it is known to have a complex spectrum. The spectrum of the object shows broad Balmer emission line features reaching full width at half maximum (FWHM) of 7500 km s^{−1} and a non-stellar continuum. In additional, 4C +74.26 also has narrow forbidden lines and is heavily affected by X-ray absorption caused by both intrinsic and Galactic material.

An observation by the Suzaku satellite in 2008, showed 4C +74.26 was in its highest flux state. During the observations, the brightness of the object increased by 20 percent with its spectra hardening. Its root mean square variability also increased along with energy reaching up to 4 keV. Although a broad iron line is seen, emission isn't required. The best fitted large inner radius of 4C +74.26, indicates either its inner disk has disappeared or not illuminated strongly.
