= Akari (space telescope) =

Infrared astronomy satellite developed by Japan Aerospace Exploration Agency

AKARI
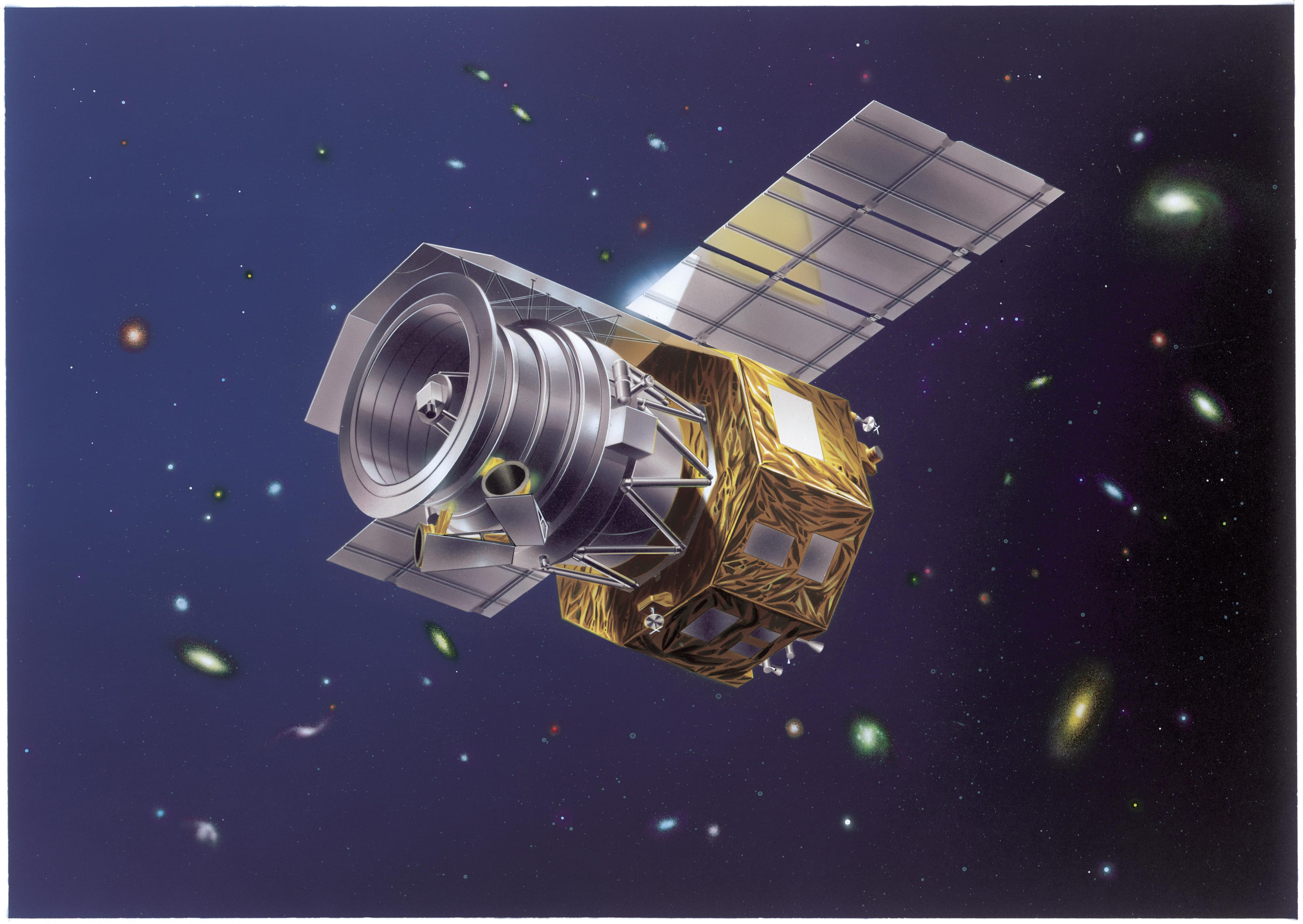
- Artist's conception of AKARI
- Mission type: Infrared telescope
- Operator: JAXA
- COSPAR ID: 2006-005A
- SATCAT no.: 28939
- Website: global.jaxa.jp/projects/sat/astro_f/
- Mission duration: 5 years, 9 months

Spacecraft properties
- Manufacturer: ISAS
- Launch mass: 952 kg (2,099 lb)
- Dimensions: 5.5 m × 1.9 m × 3.2 m (18.0 ft × 6.2 ft × 10.5 ft)

Start of mission
- Launch date: 21:28, 21 February 2006 (UTC)
- Rocket: M-V, mission M-V-8
- Launch site: M-V Pad, Uchinoura Space Center

End of mission
- Disposal: decommissioned
- Deactivated: 24 November 2011
- Decay date: 11 April 2023, 04:44 UTC

Orbital parameters
- Reference system: Geocentric
- Regime: Sun-synchronous
- Semi-major axis: 6,884 km (4,278 mi)
- Eccentricity: 0.0129527
- Perigee altitude: 423.9 km (263.4 mi)
- Apogee altitude: 602.3 km (374.3 mi)
- Inclination: 98.2 degrees
- Period: 94.7 minutes
- RAAN: 305.9392 degrees
- Argument of perigee: 124.2012 degrees
- Mean anomaly: 354.1441 degrees
- Mean motion: 15.1995622 rev/day
- Epoch: 9 July 2015, 13:43:21 UTC
- Revolution no.: 50455

Main telescope
- Type: Ritchey–Chrétien
- Diameter: 0.67 m (2.2 ft)
- Focal length: 4.2 m (14 ft)
- Wavelengths: 1.7 to 180 μm (Infrared)

Instruments
- FIS: Far-Infrared Surveyor; IRC: Infra-Red Camera

AKARI (ASTRO-F) was an infrared space telescope developed by Japan Aerospace Exploration Agency (JAXA), in cooperation with institutes of Europe and Korea. It was launched on 21 February 2006, at 21:28 UTC (06:28, 22 February JST) by M-V rocket into Earth Sun-synchronous orbit. After its launch it was named AKARI (明かり), which means light in Japanese. Earlier on, the project was known as IRIS (InfraRed Imaging Surveyor).

Its primary mission was to survey the entire sky in near-, mid- and far-infrared, through its 68.5 cm (27.0 in) aperture telescope.

== Technical design ==
Its designed lifespan, of far- and mid-infrared sensors, was 550 days, limited by its liquid helium coolant.

Its telescope mirror was made of silicon carbide to save weight. The budget for the satellite was ¥13.4 billion (~US$110 million).

== History ==
By mid-August 2006, AKARI finished around 50 per cent of the all-sky survey.

By early November 2006, first (phase-1) all-sky survey finished. Second (phase-2) all-sky survey started on 10 November 2006.

Due to the malfunction of Sun sensor after the launch, ejection of telescope aperture lid was delayed, resulting in the coolant lifespan estimate being shortened to about 500 days from launch. However, after JAXA estimated the remaining helium during early March 2007, observation time was extended at least until 9 September.

On 11 July 2007, JAXA informed that 90 per cent of the sky was scanned twice. Also around 3,500 selected targets have been observed so far.

On 26 August 2007, liquid helium coolant depleted, which means the completion of far- and mid-infrared observation. More than 96 per cent of the sky was scanned and more than 5,000 pointed observations were done.

British and Japanese project team members were awarded a Daiwa Adrian Prize in 2004, by the Daiwa Anglo-Japanese Foundation in recognition of their collaboration.

During December 2007, JAXA performed orbit correction manoeuvres to bring AKARI back into its ideal orbit. This was necessary because the boiled-off helium led to an increase in altitude. If this had continued, the energy supply would have been cut off.

=== 2008–2010 ===
A limited-observation 'warm' programme continued with just NIR.

=== End of mission ===
In May 2011, AKARI suffered a major electrical failure and the batteries could not take full charge from the solar panels. As a result, its science instruments were rendered inoperable when the satellite was in the Earth's shadow. The operation of satellite was terminated officially on 24 November 2011. The satellite reentered the atmosphere on 11 April 2023 at 04:44 UTC.

== Results ==
- Star formation over three generations in the nebula IC4954/4955 in the constellation Vulpecula
- The first infrared detection of a supernova remnant in the Small Magellanic Cloud
- Detection of mass loss from relatively young red-giant stars in the globular cluster NGC 104
- Detection of the molecular gas surrounding the active galactic nucleus in the ultra luminous infrared galaxy
- The constellation Orion and the winter Milky Way at 140 micrometres
- Star-forming region in the constellation Cygnus
- Active star formation viewed from the outside: the peculiar spiral galaxy M101
- Dust processing in the supernova remnants in the Large Magellanic Cloud

The AKARI All-Sky Survey Point Source Catalogues was released on 30 March 2010.

Astronomy & Astrophysics, Vol. 514 (May 2010) was a feature issue of AKARI's results.

== See also ==
- Infrared astronomy
- List of largest infrared telescopes
- List of space telescopes
- SPICA – proposed (eventually not built) successor space telescope to AKARI
