= NGC 1550 =

Lenticular galaxy in the constellation Taurus

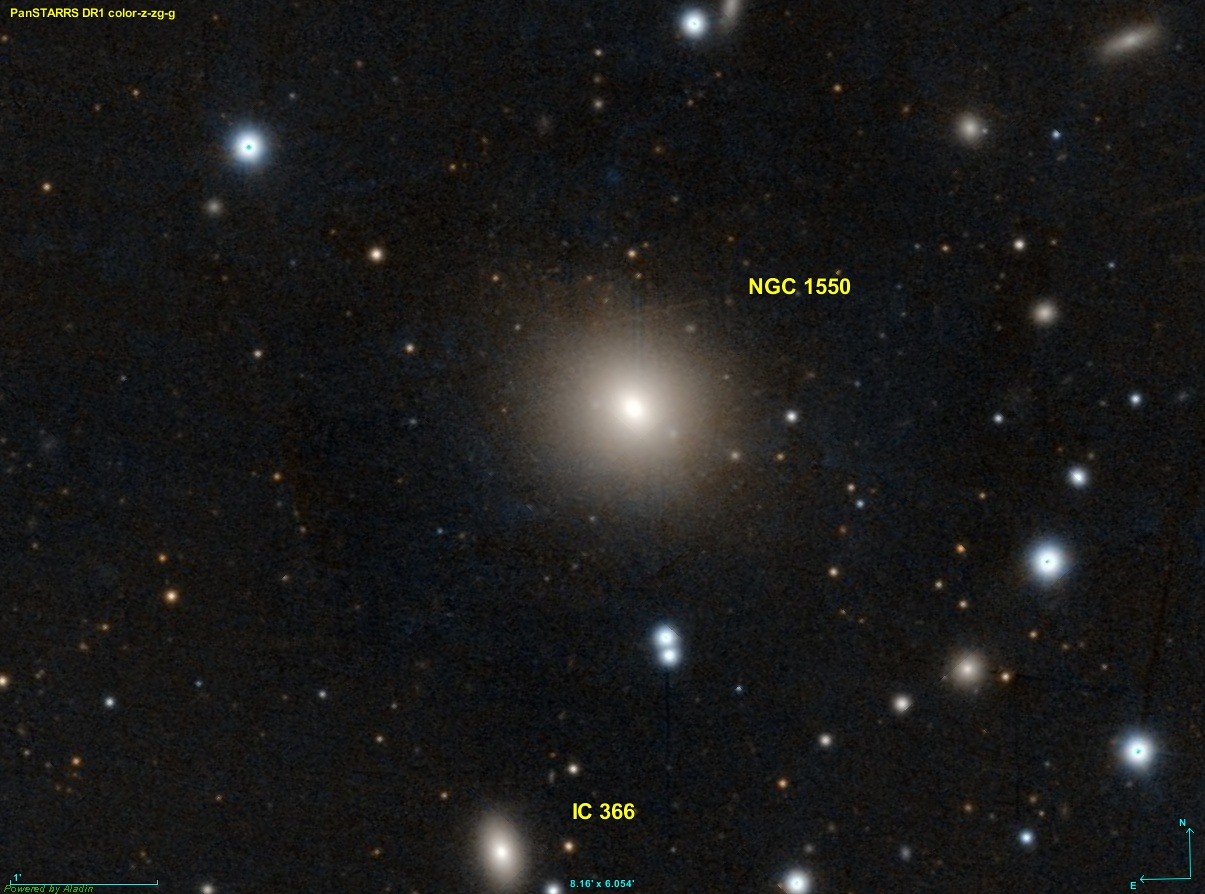
- The lenticular galaxy NGC 1550

Observation data
- Constellation: Taurus
- Right ascension: 04/19/37.9
- Declination: 02/24/34
- Redshift: 0.012403 ± 0.000058
- Heliocentric radial velocity: 3,718 ± 17
- Distance: 174,754 ± 12,263 kly (53,580,000 ± 3,760,000 pc)
- Apparent magnitude (V): 12.0

Characteristics
- Type: Lenticular galaxy

Other designations
- NGC 1551; PGC 14880; CGCG 393-1; UGC 1551; MCG 0-11-55

NGC 1550 is a lenticular galaxy located in the constellation Taurus. NGC 1550 was discovered by the German-British astronomer William Herschel in 1785. NGC 1550 was also observed by the Prussian astronomer Heinrich d'Arrest on December 29, 1861 and was added to the New General Catalogue under the designation NGC 1551.

== Characteristics ==
Its speed relative to the cosmic microwave background is 3,633 ± 18 km/s, which corresponds to a Hubble distance of 53.6 ± 3.8 Mpc.

A measurement not based on redshift gives a distance of 83,500 Mpc.

== NGC 1550 group ==
The NGC 1550 group is a galaxy group that contains eight galaxies: NGC 1550, NGC 1542, UGC 2994, UGC 2998, UGC 3002, UGC 3004, UGC 3010 and PGC 14744. Of these galaxies, NGC 1550 is the brightest.

In 2020, observations from Chandra suggested that galaxies in the NGC 1550 group are heated by active galactic nuclei.

== See also ==
- List of NGC objects
