= Sagamihara Campus =

Coordinates: 35°33′30″N 139°23′43″E

Sagamihara Campus (JAXA)
- 相模原キャンパス

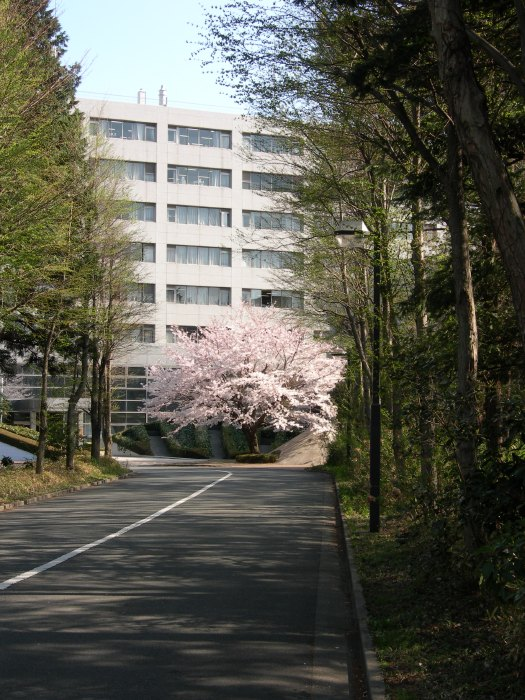
- Main entrance
- Established: 1989
- Field of research: Aerospace
- Location: Sagamihara, Kanagawa, Japan
- Operating agency: Japan Aerospace Exploration Agency
- Imfobox contains data translated from the corresponding Japanese Wikipedia article

Sagamihara Campus is a facility of the Japan Aerospace Exploration Agency (JAXA) in Sagamihara, Kanagawa Prefecture.

== Gallery ==
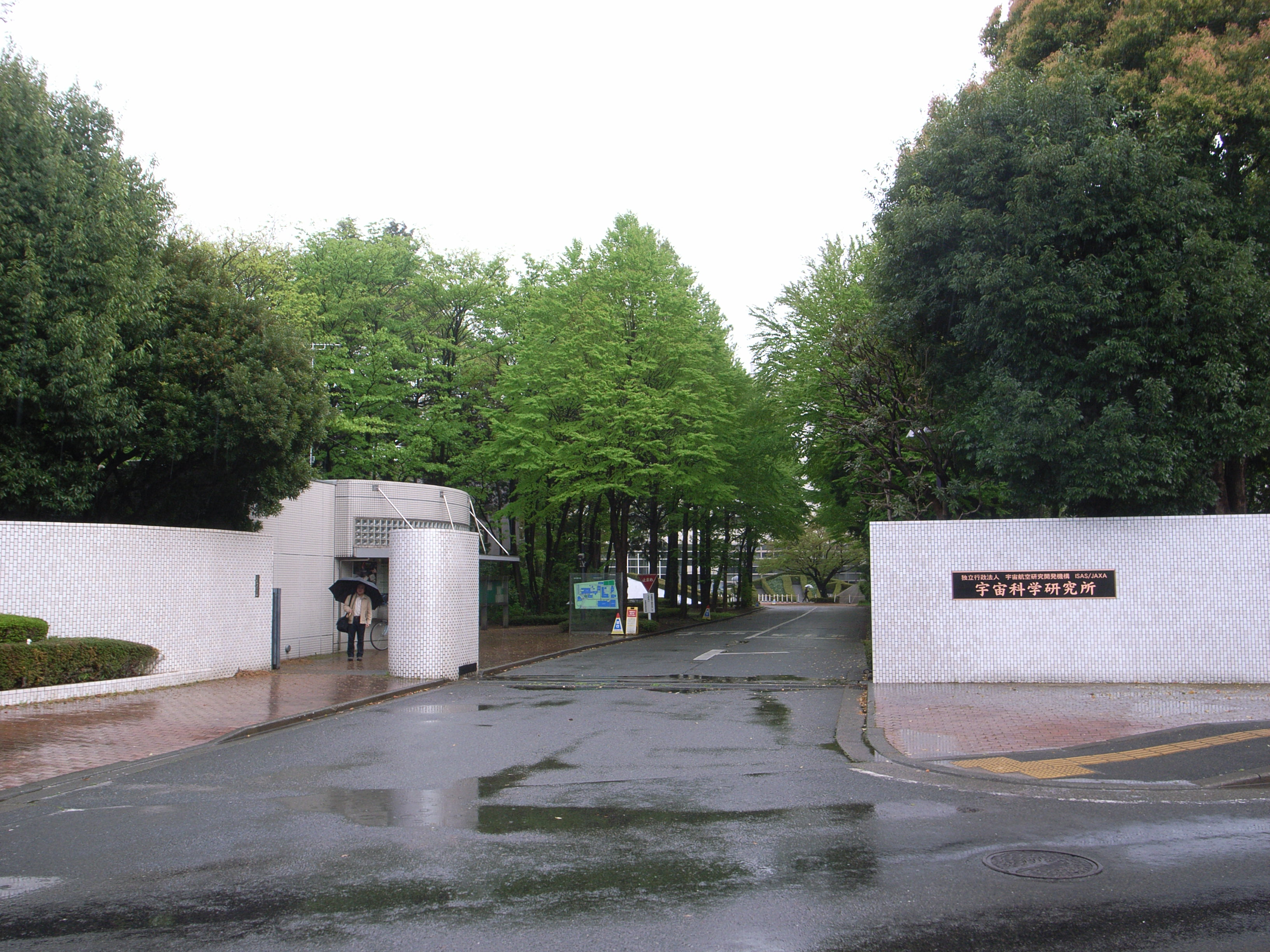
Entrance gate

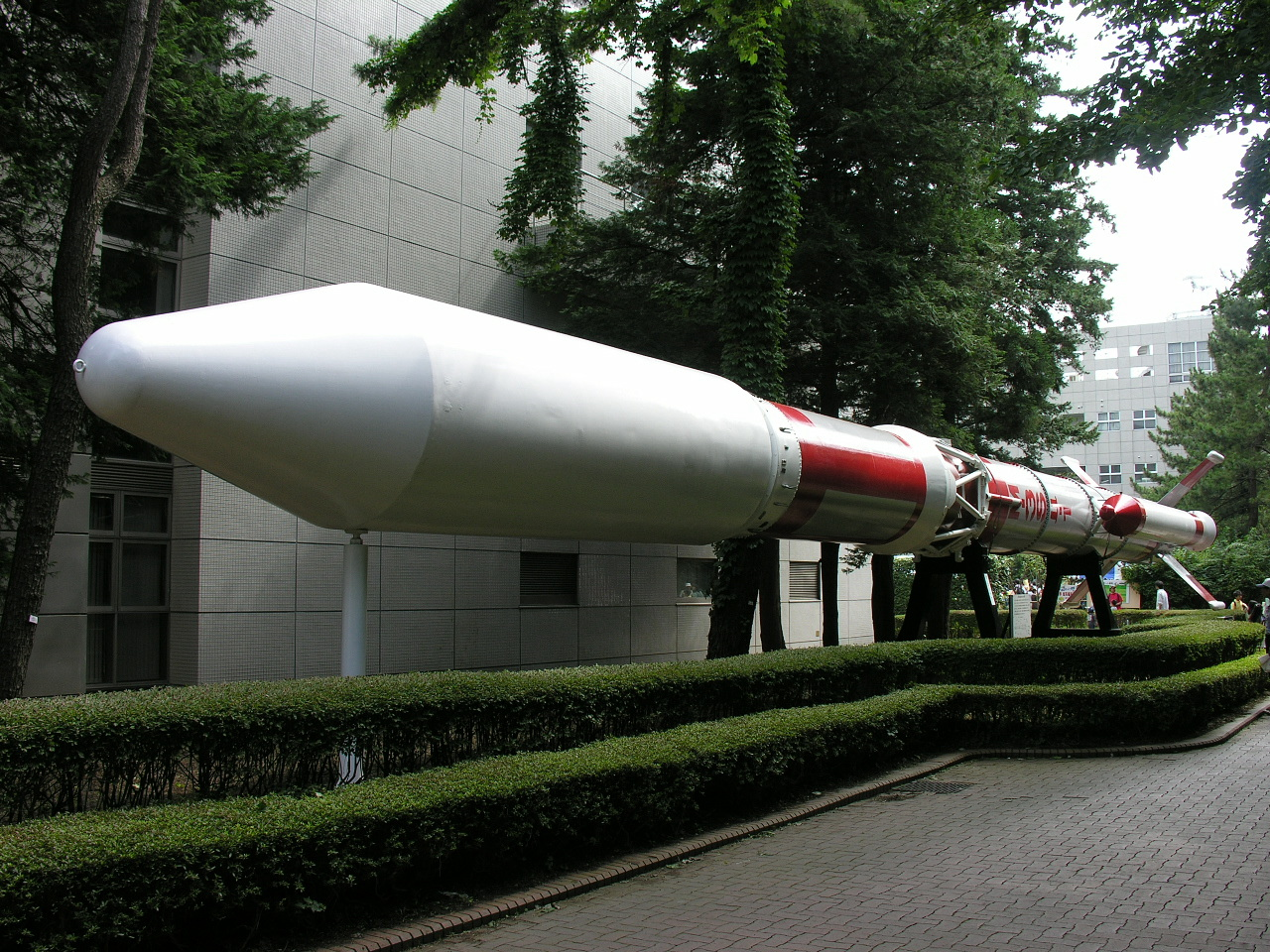
M-3SII launch vehicle

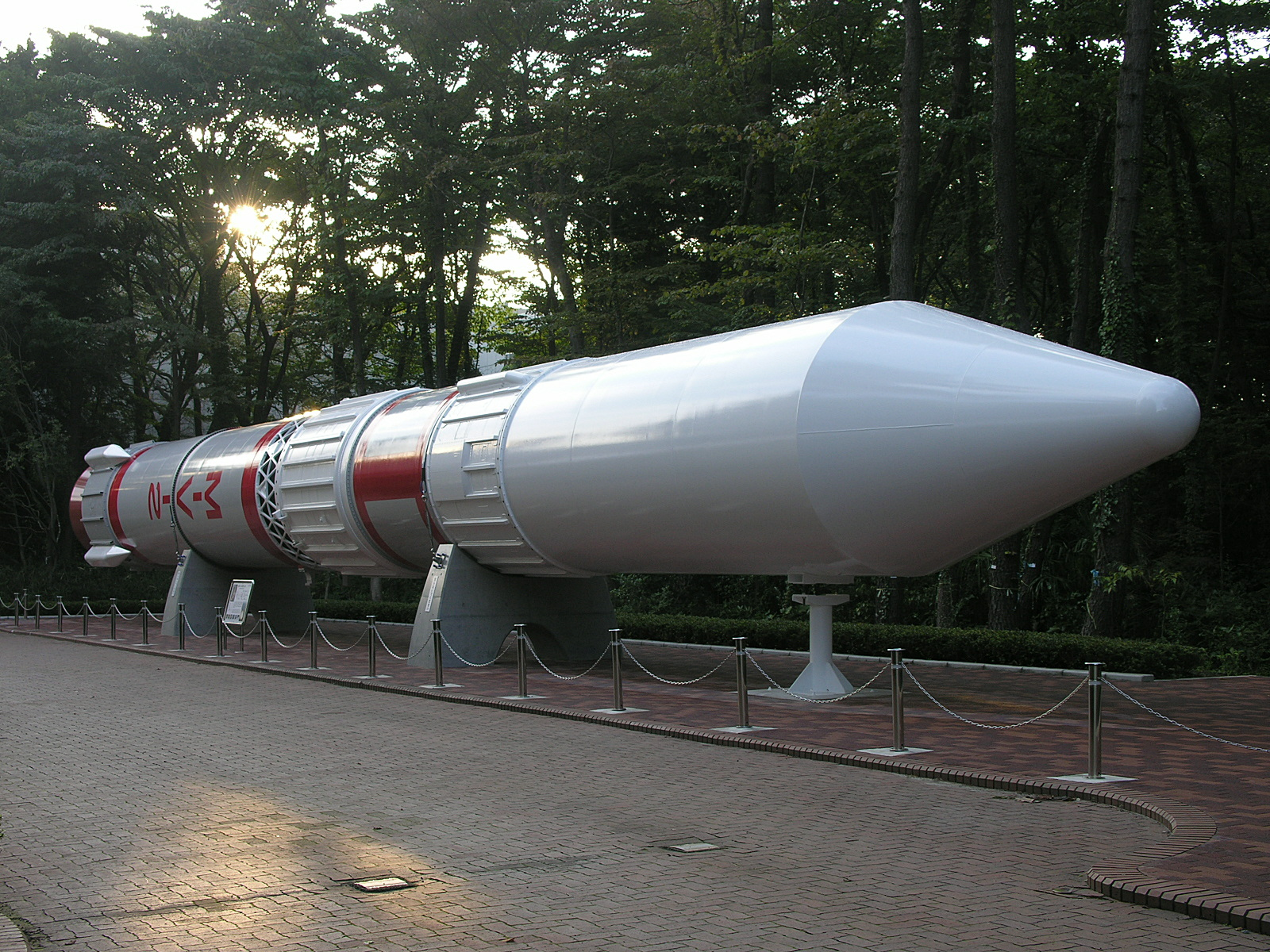
M-V launch vehicle

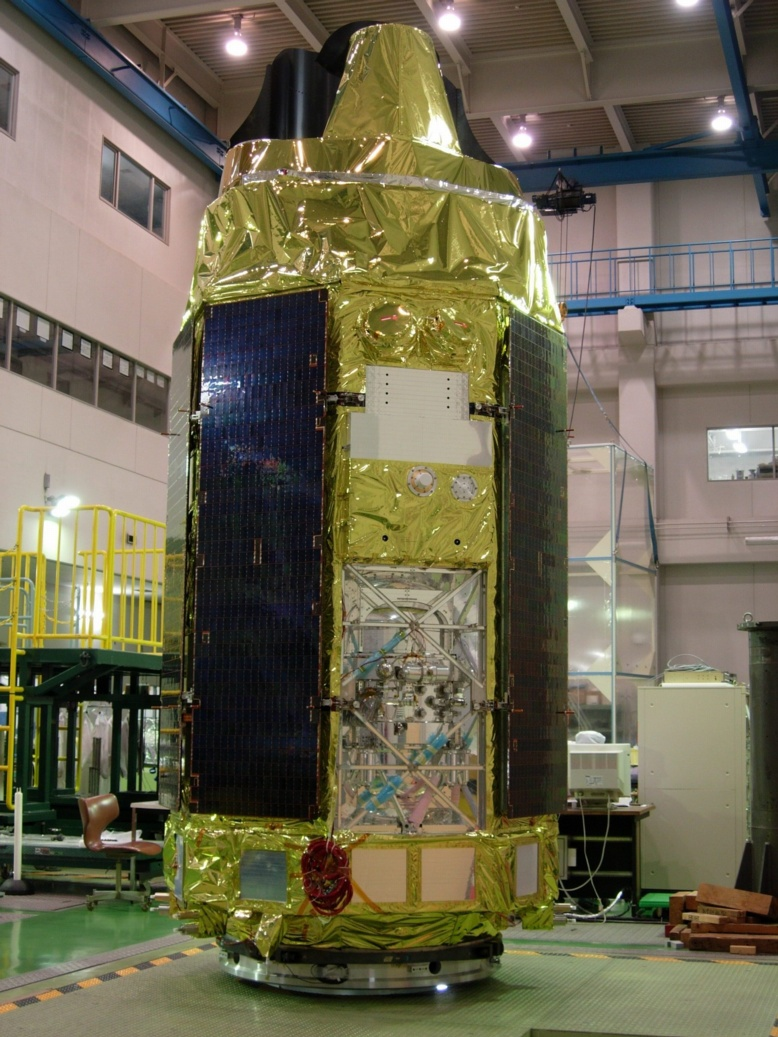
Suzaku of before vibration test.

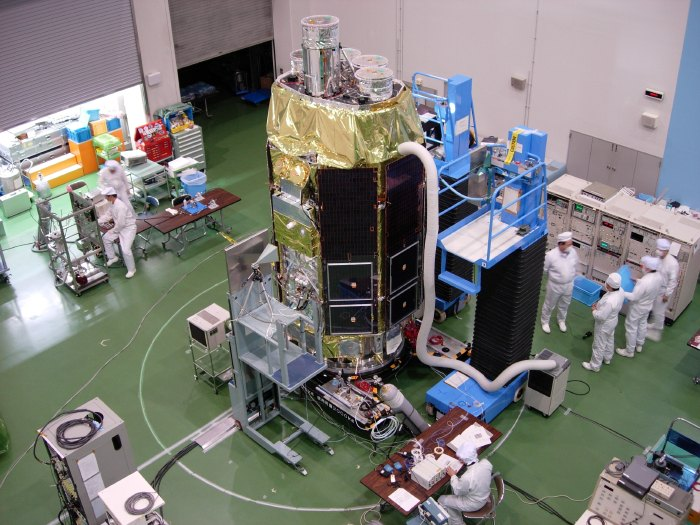
Suzaku in Cleanroom for test.
