= M-V =

Japanese solid-fuel rocket designed to launch scientific satellites

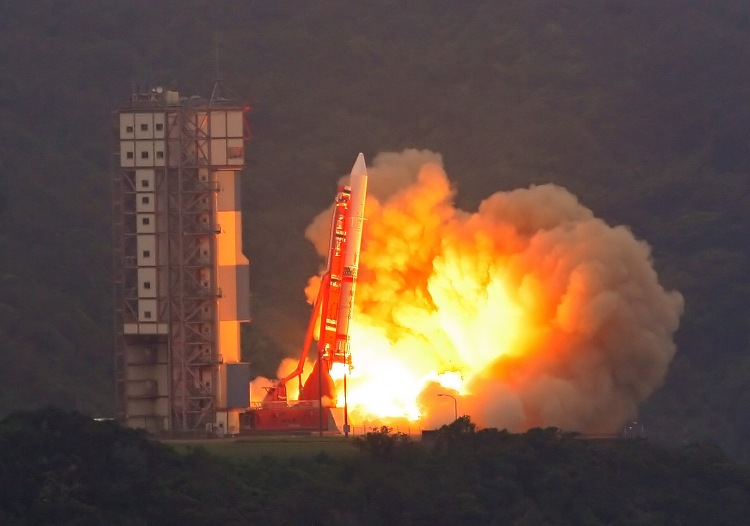
- The fifth M-V launches with the ASTRO-EII spacecraft.
- Function: All-solid small orbital launch vehicle
- Manufacturer: Nissan Motors (-2000); IHI AEROSPACE (-2006)
- Country of origin: Japan

Size
- Height: 30.8 m (101 ft)
- Diameter: 2.5 m (8 ft 2 in)
- Mass: 137,500–139,000 kg (303,100–306,400 lb)
- Stages: 3 or 4

Capacity

Payload to low Earth orbit
- Mass: 1,800 kg (4,000 lb)

Payload to polar LEO
- Mass: 1,300 kg (2,900 lb)

Launch history
- Status: Retired
- Launch sites: Uchinoura M-V
- Total launches: 7 (M-V: 4, M-V KM: 3)
- Success(es): 6 (M-V: 3, M-V KM: 3)
- Failure: 1 (M-V)
- First flight: M-V: 10 February 2000; M-V KM: 12 February 1997
- Last flight: M-V: 22 September 2006; M-V KM: 9 May 2003
- Carries passengers or cargo: HALCA, Nozomi, ASTRO-E, Hayabusa; Suzaku, AKARI; Hinode

First stage – M-14
- Powered by: 1 solid
- Maximum thrust: 3,780.345 kN (849,855 lb_{f})
- Specific impulse: 246 s (2.41 km/s)
- Burn time: 46 seconds
- Propellant: Solid

Second stage – M-24
- Powered by: 1 solid
- Maximum thrust: 1,245.287 kN (279,952 lb_{f})
- Specific impulse: 203 s (1.99 km/s)
- Burn time: 71 seconds
- Propellant: Solid

Third stage – M-34
- Powered by: 1 solid
- Maximum thrust: 294 kN (66,000 lb_{f})
- Specific impulse: 301 s (2.95 km/s)
- Burn time: 102 seconds
- Propellant: Solid

Fourth stage (M-V KM) – KM-V1
- Powered by: 1 solid
- Maximum thrust: 51.9 kN (11,700 lb_{f})
- Specific impulse: 298 s (2.92 km/s)
- Burn time: 73 seconds
- Propellant: Solid

The M-V rocket, also called M-5 or Mu-5, was a Japanese solid-fuel rocket designed to launch scientific satellites. It was a member of the Mu family of rockets. The Institute of Space and Astronautical Science (ISAS) began developing the M-V in 1990 at a cost of 15 billion yen. It has three stages and is 30.7 m (101 ft) high, 2.5 m (8 ft 2 in) in diameter, and weighs about 140,000 kg (310,000 lb). It was capable of launching a satellite weighing 1,800 kg (4,000 lb) into an orbit as high as 250 km (160 mi).

The first M-V rocket launched the HALCA radio astronomy satellite in 1997, and the second the Nozomi Mars explorer in July 1998. The third rocket attempted to launch the Astro-E X-ray satellite on 10 February 2000 but failed. ISAS recovered from this setback and launched Hayabusa to 25143 Itokawa in 2003. The following M-V launch was the scientific Astro-E2 satellite, a replacement for Astro-E, which took place on 10 July 2005. The final launch was that of the Hinode (SOLAR-B) spacecraft, along with the SSSat microsat and a nanosatellite, HIT-SAT, on 22 September 2006.

== Launch outcomes ==
- Failure
- Success

== Launch history ==
Flight No.	Date and time, UTC	Rocket, configuration	Launch site	Payload	Payload mass	Orbit	Customer	Launch outcome
M-V-1	12 February 1997; 04:50:00	M-V	Uchinoura M-V	MUSES-B (HALCA)				Success
M-V-3	3 July 1998; 18:12:00	M-V	Uchinoura M-V	PLANET-B (Nozomi)				Success
M-V-4	10 February 2000; 01:30:00	M-V	Uchinoura M-V	ASTRO-E				Failure
M-V-4	Failure of 1st stage engine nozzle caused control system breakdown and under performance. Later stages could not compensate for under performance leaving payload in 250 miles (400 km) x 50 miles (80 km) orbit and subsequent reentry.							
M-V-5	9 May 2003; 04:29:25	M-V	Uchinoura M-V	MUSES-C (Hayabusa)				Success
M-V-6	10 July 2005; 03:30:00	M-V	Uchinoura M-V	ASTRO-E2 (Suzaku)				Success
M-V-8	21 February 2006; 21:28:00	M-V	Uchinoura M-V	ASTRO-F (Akari); CUTE-1.7 + APD; SSP (solar sail sub payload)				Success
M-V-8	SSP failed to open completely							
M-V-7	22 September 2006; 21:36	M-V	Uchinoura M-V	SOLAR-B (Hinode); HIT-SAT; SSSat (solar sail)				Success
M-V-7	SSSat failed after launch							

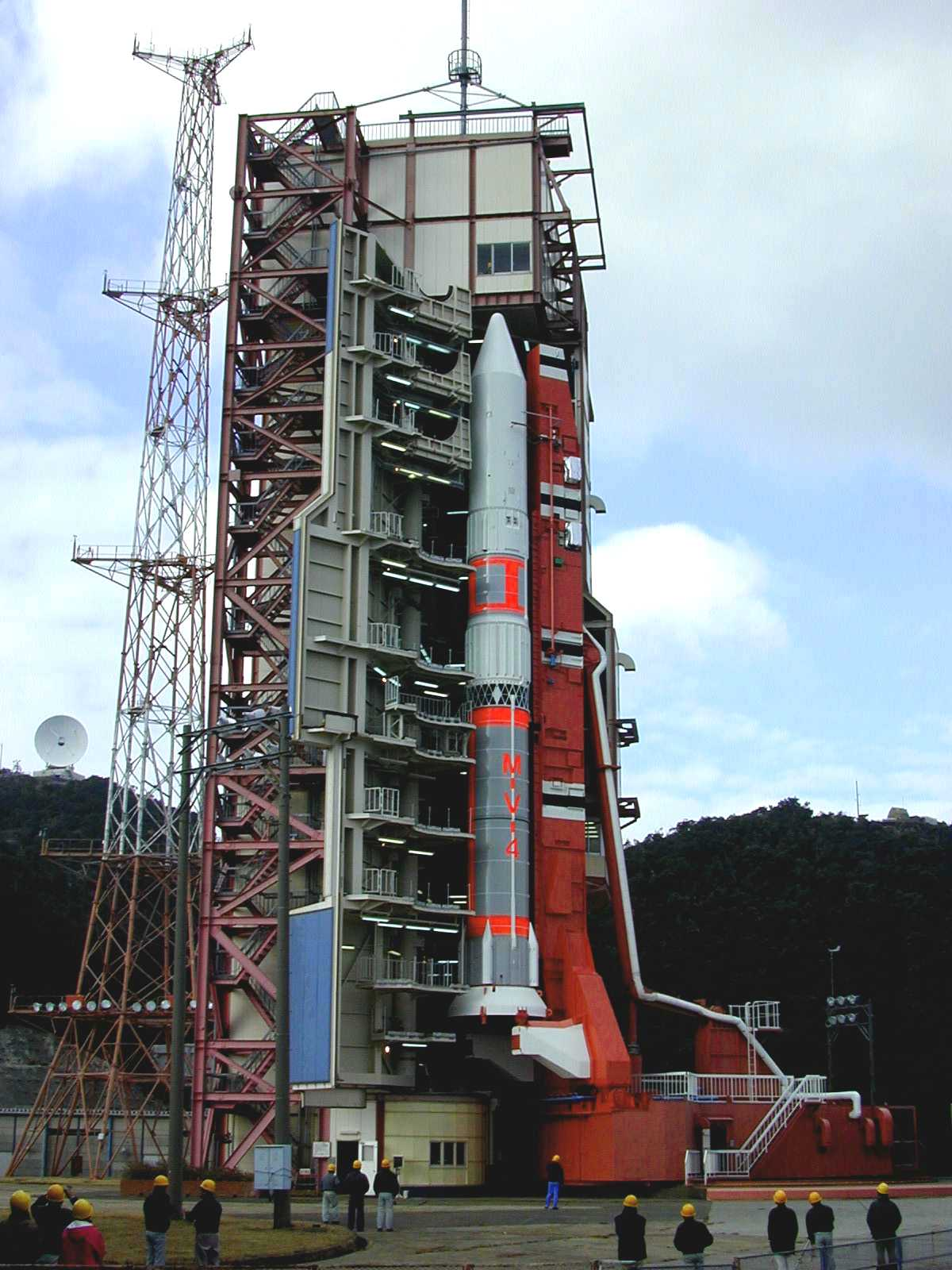
M-V rocket with the ASTRO-E satellite.

== Following program ==
A follow on to the M-V, called the Epsilon Rocket, features a lower 1.2 tonne LEO payload capability. The development aim is to reduce costs, primarily by using the H-IIA solid rocket booster as the first stage and through shorter launch preparation time. Epsilon launches are intended to cost much less than the US$70 million launch cost of a M-V.

The first launch, of a small scientific satellite SPRINT-A (Hisaki), took place in September 2013. The initial launches will be of a two-stage version, of Epsilon, with up to a 500 kilogram LEO payload capability.

== Potential as an intercontinental ballistic missile ==
Solid fuel rockets are the design of choice for military applications as they can remain in storage for long periods, and then reliably launch at short notice.

Lawmakers made national security arguments for keeping Japan's solid-fuel rocket technology alive after ISAS was merged into JAXA, which also has the H-IIA liquid-fuelled rocket, in 2003. The ISAS director of external affairs, Yasunori Matogawa, said, "It seems the hard-line national security proponents in parliament are increasing their influence, and they aren't getting much criticism... I think we’re moving into a very dangerous period. When you consider the current environment and the threat from North Korea, it's scary".

Toshiyuki Shikata, a Tokyo Metropolitan Government adviser and former lieutenant general, claimed that part of the rationale for the fifth M-V Hayabusa mission was that the reentry and landing of its return capsule demonstrated "that Japan's ballistic missile capability is credible".

At a technical level the M-V design could be weaponised quickly (as an Intercontinental ballistic missile, since only payload and guidance have to be changed) although this would be politically unlikely. The M-V is comparable in performance to the LGM-118 Peacekeeper ICBM.

== Comparable solid fuel rockets ==
- Athena II
- Epsilon
- Minotaur IV
- Shavit
- Minotaur-C
- Vega

== See also ==
- Comparison of orbital launchers families
- Comparison of orbital launch systems
