= Suzaku (satellite) =

Satellite

Suzaku (ASTRO-EII)
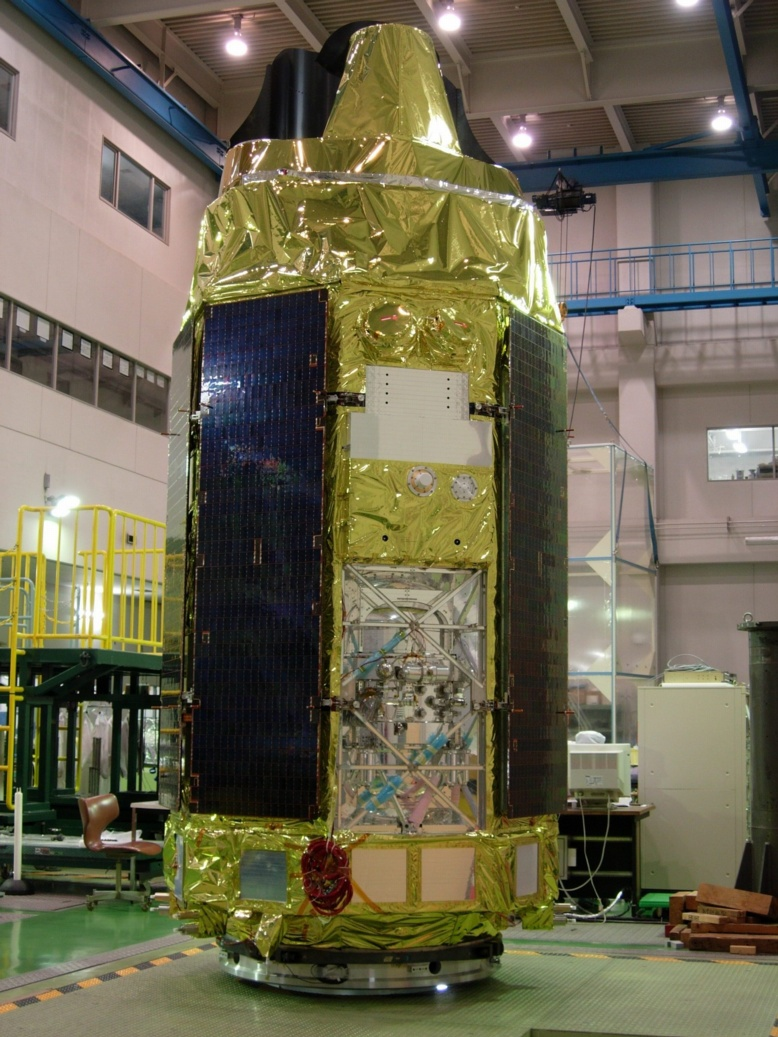
- A picture of a fully integrated Astro-E2 before vibration tests at ISAS/JAXA.
- Names: ASTRO-EII
- Mission type: Astronomy
- Operator: JAXA / NASA
- COSPAR ID: 2005-025A
- SATCAT no.: 28773
- Website: www.jaxa.jp/projects/sat/astro_e2
- Mission duration: 2 years (planned); 10 years 1 month 23 days (achieved)

Spacecraft properties
- Spacecraft type: ASTRO
- Bus: ASTRO-E
- Manufacturer: Toshiba
- Launch mass: 1,706 kg (3,761 lb)
- Dimensions: 2 metres x 5 metres
- Power: 500 watts

Start of mission
- Launch date: 10 July 2005, 03:30:00 UTC
- Rocket: M-V # 6
- Launch site: Uchinoura Space Center, Uchinoura, Kagoshima

End of mission
- Deactivated: 2 September 2015
- Decay date: 5 January 2025

Orbital parameters
- Reference system: Geocentric orbit
- Regime: Low Earth orbit
- Perigee altitude: 550 km (340 mi)
- Apogee altitude: 550 km (340 mi)
- Inclination: 31°
- Period: 96 minutes

Instruments
- X-ray Spectrometer-2 (XRS-2); X-ray Imaging Spectrometer (XIS); Hard X-ray Detector (HXD)

Suzaku (formerly ASTRO-EII) was an X-ray astronomy satellite developed jointly by the Institute of Space and Aeronautical Science at JAXA and NASA's Goddard Space Flight Center to probe high-energy X-ray sources, such as supernova explosions, black holes and galactic clusters. It was launched on 10 July 2005 aboard the M-V launch vehicle on the M-V-6 mission. After its successful launch, the satellite was renamed Suzaku after the mythical Vermilion bird of the South.

== Spacecraft instruments ==
Suzaku carried high spectroscopic resolution, very wide energy band instruments for detecting signals ranging from soft X-rays up to gamma-rays (0.3–600 keV). High-resolution spectroscopy and wide-band are essential factors in physically investigating high-energy astronomical phenomena, such as black holes and supernovas. One such feature, the K-line (x-ray), may be key to more direct imaging of black holes.

Instruments

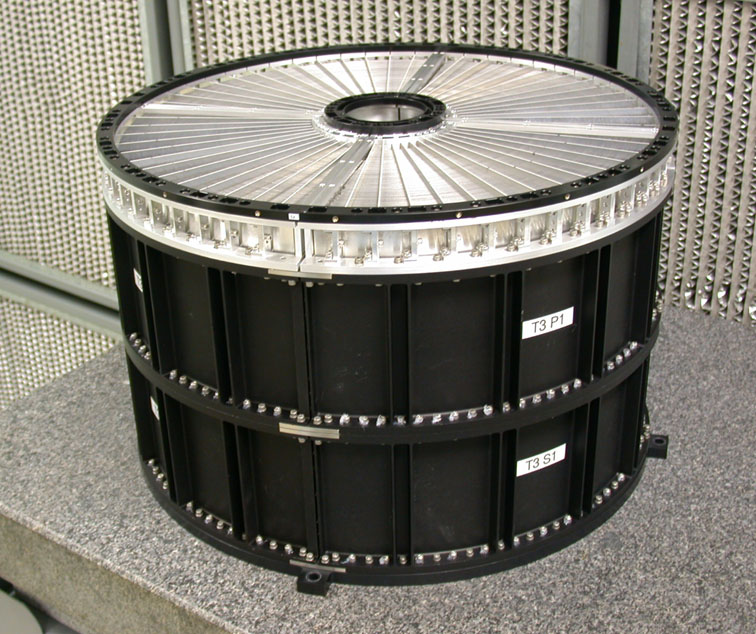
X-ray Telescope (XRT) – four units (spatial resolution ~2', with field of view of about 17')

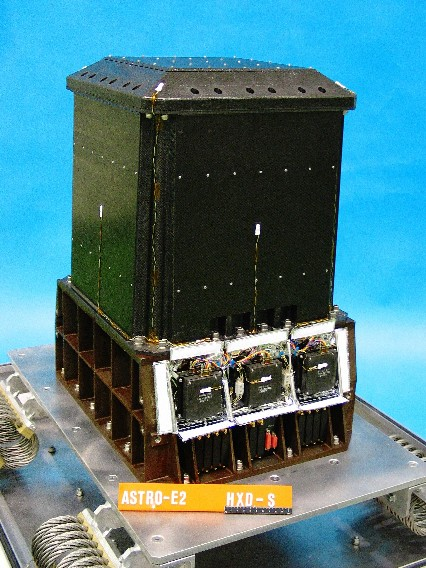
Hard X-ray Detector (HXD). Uses Gadolinium Silicate crystal (GSO), Gd_{2}SiO_{5}(Ce); uses Bismuth Germanate crystal (BGO), Bi_{4}Ge_{3}O_{12}

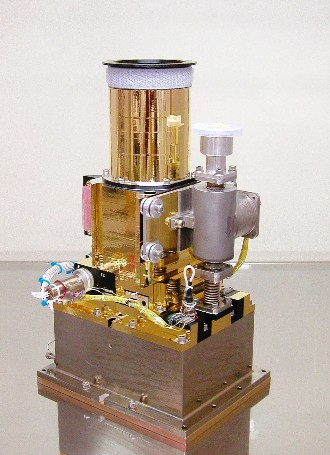
X-ray Imaging Spectrometer (XIS) – four units each located in the focus of an XRT (enery range 0.2–12 kev)

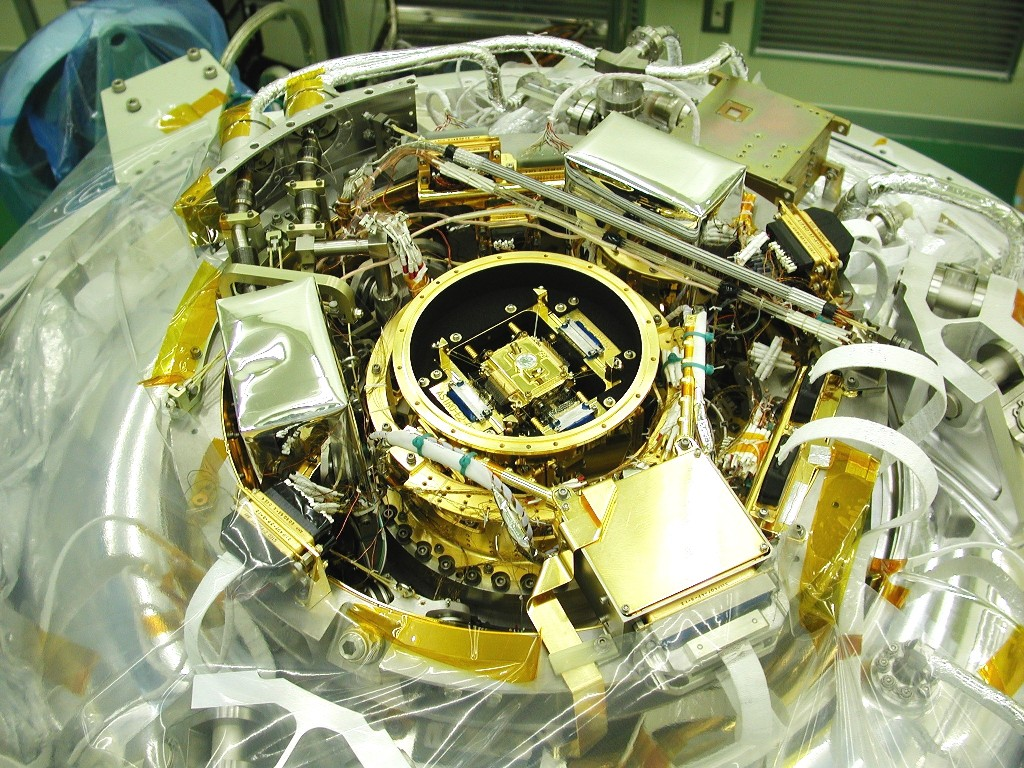
X-ray Spectrometer-2 (XRS-2)

== Mission ==
Just weeks after launch, on 29 July 2005, the first of a series of cooling system malfunctions occurred. These ultimately caused the entire reservoir of liquid helium to boil off into space by 8 August 2005. This effectively shut down the X-ray Spectrometer-2 (XRS-2), which was the spacecraft's primary instrument. The two other instruments, the X-ray Imaging Spectrometer (XIS) and the Hard X-ray Detector (HXD), were unaffected by the malfunction. As a result, another XRS was integrated into the Hitomi X-ray satellite, launched in 2016, which also was lost weeks after launch. A Hitomi successor, XRISM, launched on 7 September 2023, with an X-ray Spectrometer (Resolve) onboard as the primary instrument.

On 26 August 2015, JAXA announced that communications with Suzaku had been intermittent since 1 June 2015 and that the resumption of scientific operations would take a lot of work to accomplish, given the spacecraft's condition. Mission operators decided to complete the mission imminently, as Suzaku had exceeded its design lifespan by eight years at this point. The mission came to an end on 2 September 2015, when JAXA commanded the radio transmitters on Suzaku to switch themselves off.

== Results ==
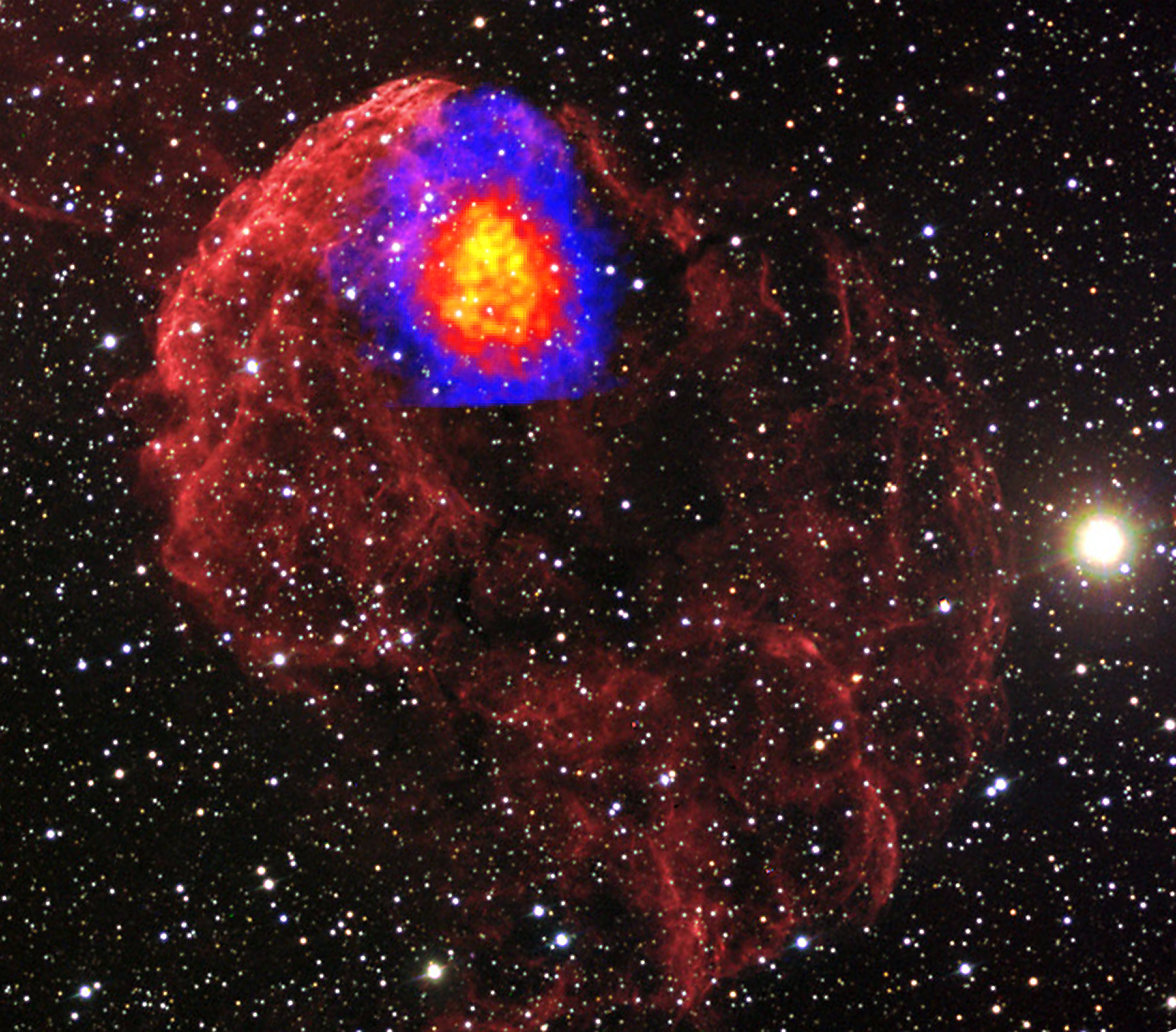
In a supernova remnant known as the Jellyfish Nebula, Suzaku detected X-rays from fully ionized silicon and sulfu.

Suzaku discovered "fossil" light from a supernova remnant.

== ASTRO-E ==
ASTRO-E
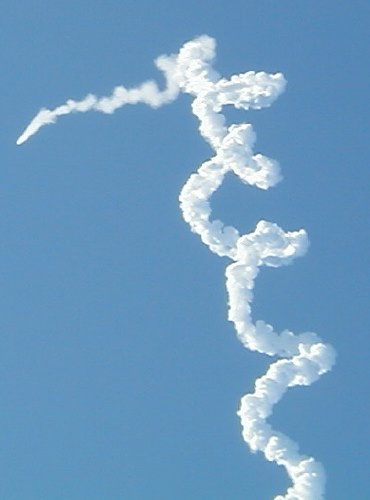
- The M-V launch vehicle carrying ASTRO-E veering off course after launch on 10 February 2000.
- Mission type: Astronomy
- Operator: Institute of Space and Astronautical Science (ISAS) / NASA
- COSPAR ID: 2005-025A
- SATCAT no.: 28773
- Mission duration: Failed to orbit

Spacecraft properties
- Spacecraft type: ASTRO
- Bus: ASTRO-E
- Manufacturer: Toshiba
- Launch mass: 1600 kg
- Dimensions: 2 metres x 5 metres
- Power: 500 watts

Start of mission
- Launch date: 10 February 2000, 01:30:00 UTC
- Rocket: M-V # 4
- Launch site: Kagoshima Space Center

End of mission
- Decay date: Failed to orbit

Orbital parameters
- Reference system: Geocentric orbit (planned)
- Regime: Low Earth orbit
- Perigee altitude: 550 km (340 mi)
- Apogee altitude: 550 km (340 mi)
- Inclination: 31.0°
- Period: 96.0 minutes

Instruments
- X-ray Spectrometer (XRS); X-ray Imaging Spectrometer (XIS); Hard X-ray Detector (HXD); X-ray Telescope (XRT)

Suzaku was a replacement for ASTRO-E, which was lost in a launch failure. The M-V launch vehicle on the M-V-4 mission launched on 10 February 2000 at 01:30:00 UTC. It experienced a failure of 1st stage engine nozzle 42 seconds into the launch, causing control system breakdown and underperformance. Later stages could not compensate for underperformance, leaving payload in 250 miles (400 km) x 50 miles (80 km) orbit and subsequent reentry and crash with its payload into the Indian Ocean.
