= S210 =

S210 may refer to:

- S-210, a 1969 single stage Japanese sounding rocket
- Coolpix S210, a Nikon Coolpix series digital camera
