= Ohsumi (satellite) =

First Japanese satellite put into orbit, launched in 1970

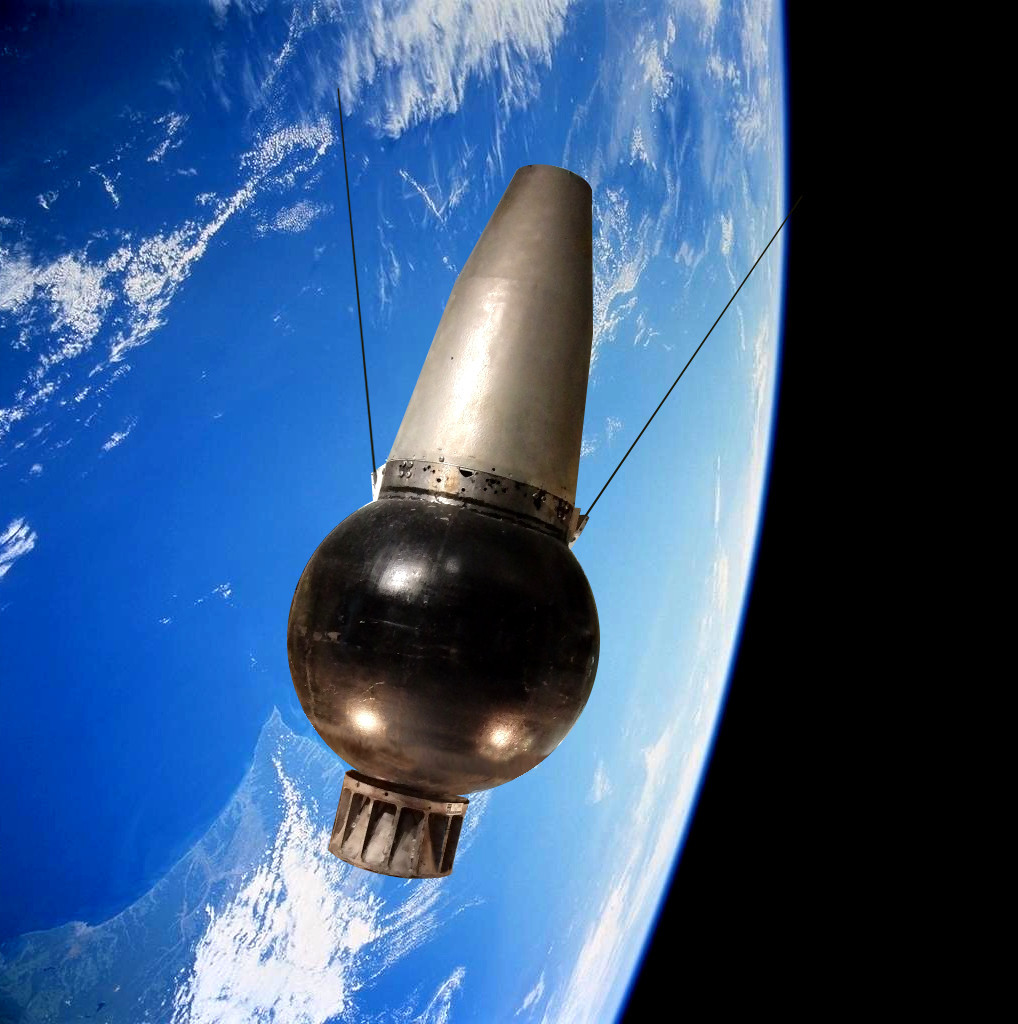
- Artist's rendition of Ohsumi in orbit.
- Mission type: Earth science
- Operator: Institute of Space and Aeronautical Science, University of Tokyo (now part of JAXA)
- COSPAR ID: 1970-011A
- SATCAT no.: 04330
- Mission duration: 33 years, 5 months and 21 days

Spacecraft properties
- Launch mass: 24.0 kilograms (52.9 lb)
- Power: 10.3 watt

Start of mission
- Launch date: February 11, 1970, 04:25 UTC
- Rocket: Lambda-4S
- Launch site: Kagoshima LA-L
- Contractor: ISAS

End of mission
- Last contact: February 12, 1970
- Decay date: August 2, 2003

Orbital parameters
- Reference system: Geocentric
- Regime: Medium Earth
- Eccentricity: 0.262379
- Perigee altitude: 350 kilometres (220 mi)
- Apogee altitude: 5,140 kilometres (3,190 mi)
- Inclination: 31.0 degrees
- Period: 144.0 minutes
- Epoch: 10 February 1970, 23:25:00 UTC

The Ohsumi ( or Ōsumi, おおすみ) satellite, Japan’s first artificial satellite, was launched on February 11, 1970, at 04:25 UTC (Coordinated Universal Time) by the Institute of Space and Aeronautical Science (ISAS) from the Kagoshima Space Center, which is located on the Ohsumi peninsula in Japan. This location was chosen for its strategic position in coordinating eastward launches, optimizing the rocket's trajectory. The launch vehicle was the Lambda 4S-5, a rocket developed by the ISAS of the University of Tokyo. Such an achievement marks Japan as the fourth nation to independently place a satellite into orbit.

The satellite achieved an elliptical orbit with an apogee of approximately 5,150 km and a perigee of 335 km, conducting experiments to gather data on the ionosphere and testing satellite launch technologies. Although its operational life ended within hours due to power loss, Ohsumi remained in orbit for over 33 years before re-entering the atmosphere on August 2, 2003. The mission's success laid the foundation for Japan’s later achievements in space exploration, including scientific missions such as Hakucho and Hayabusa.

== History ==
The satellite was developed by a group of researchers at the University of Tokyo formerly led by Hideo Itokawa, who had experimented with small rockets starting in the 1950s. In April 1955, the Institute of Industrial Science at the University of Tokyo, conducted an experiment to launch the 23 cm-long Pencil rocket, marking the origin of the Institute of Space and Astronautical Science. This attracted government support and in the 1960s, these rockets reached 700 km in altitude. Japan began to participate in the International Geophysical Year events and carried out observations of the upper atmosphere and cosmic rays through the use of K-6-type rockets that used solid propellant. This paved the way for the establishment of the Kagoshima Space Center and the opening of a full-scale launch site in 1962 . In the same year, Japan set a goal of launching a 30 kg satellite within five years. In 1962, Japan began experiments with the Lambda rocket, later iterations of which ultimately launched Ohsumi.

== Technical design ==
The Ohsumi satellite was a regular 26-sided polygonal prism with a circumscribed radius of 75 cm., length of 1,000 mm, and maximum diameter of 480 mm. Launched with a Lambda 4S-5 rocket, the satellite weight 24 kg (after combustion of the fourth motor). It was also equipped with two hook-type antennas and four beryllium-copper whip-type antennas (circular polarization). The batteries were powered by 5,184 solar cells mounted on the satellite body with an average power consumption of 10.3 W. Ohsumi was also equipped with a longitudinal precise accelerometer, longitudinal accelerometer, strain gauge-type thermometer, telemetry transmitter, beacon transmitter, pilot transmitter, and installed silver oxide-zinc battery with capacity 5AH as power supply. The design code of Ohsumi is 1970-011A, which is a designation code used in satellite tracking and cataloging.

== Launch ==
The Ohsumi satellite was launched on February 11, 1970, at 04:25 UTC (Coordinated Universal Time) from the Kagoshima Space Center, located on the Ohsumi Peninsula in Japan. The launch vehicle used was called the Lambda 4S-5 rocket, which was developed by the ISAS of the University of Tokyo. The mission marked Japan's first successful feat in launching an independent satellite into orbit, making it the fourth nation to do so after the Soviet Union, the United States, and France.

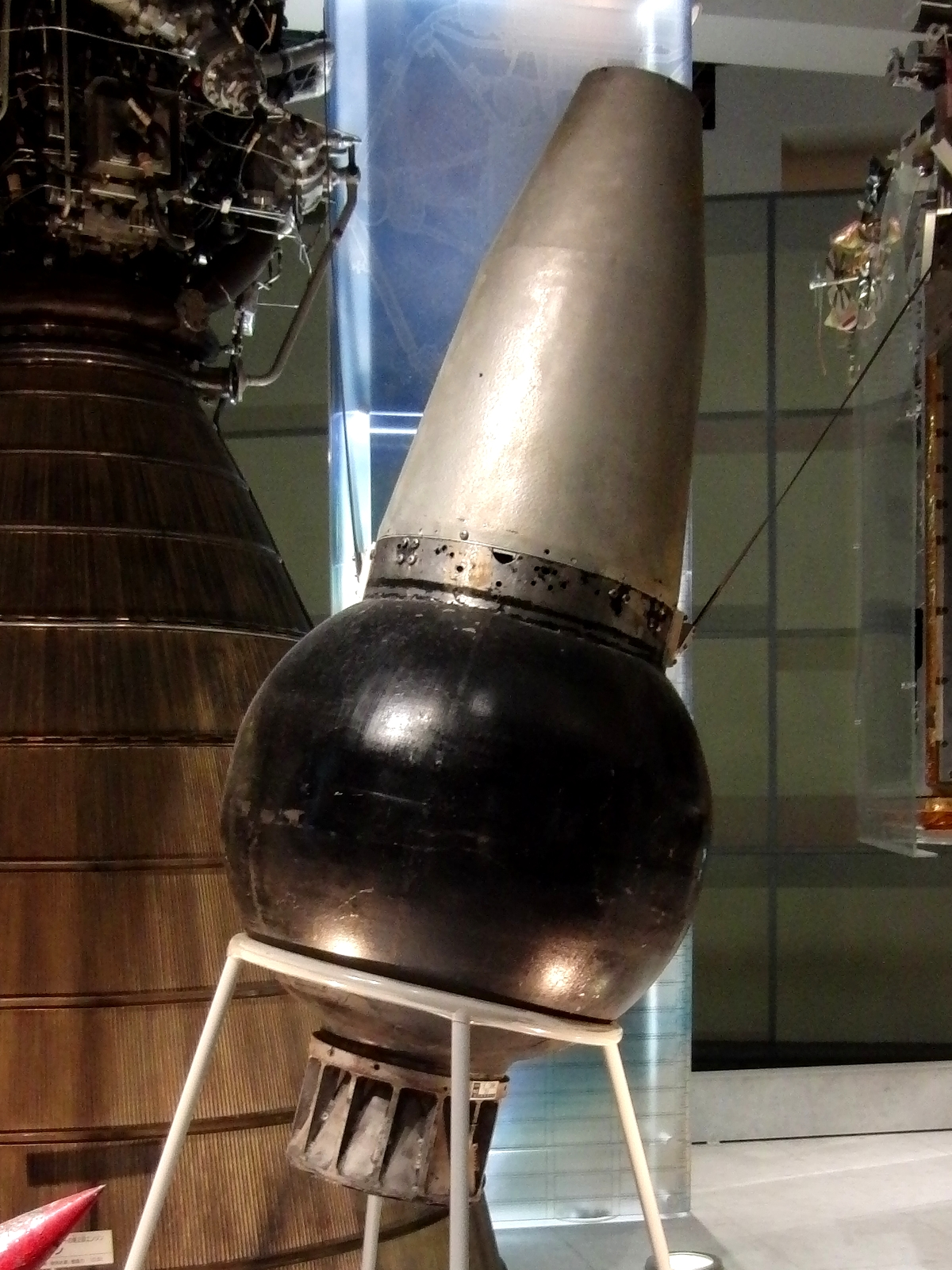
Artificial Satellite "Ōsumi", testing model. Exhibit in the National Museum of Nature and Science, Tokyo, Japan.

The satellite achieved an elliptical orbit with an apogee of approximately 5,150 km and a perigee of 335 km, allowing it to transmit data back to Earth. Despite earlier failures with the Lambda 4S series, the success of this launch highlighted Japan’s growing capabilities in space exploration and set the stage for future advancements.

== Mission ==
The main mission of the Ohsumi satellite was to lead Japan’s testing of satellite launch technologies, with the goal of launching a rocket to deploy a satellite into orbit around the Earth. The primary launch scheme developed during the launch trials was the “gravity turn maneuver,” which played a significant role in the final success of the mission. Two and a half hours after launch on February 11, 1970, the team at Uchinoura received the first return signal beam from Ohsumi to confirm a completed revolution around the world. The satellite craft was equipped with onboard tools to take measurements of the ionosphere, gathering data such as solar emission, temperature, and density while in orbit. The live operation ended during the satellite’s seventh revolution on February 12, when onboard power loss led to radio signal failures.

== Results ==
With the successful launch of Ohsumi, Japan became the fourth country after the Soviet Union, United States, and France to independently launch a satellite into space. An elliptical orbital path was achieved, straying from the original 500-km circular intended path. The Ohsumi lost power approximately 14–15 hours after launch, attributed to high temperatures experienced while in orbit. However, the satellite remained in orbit until 33 years later, on August 2, 2003, when the craft reentered the Earth’s atmosphere and melted over North Africa.

== Legacy ==
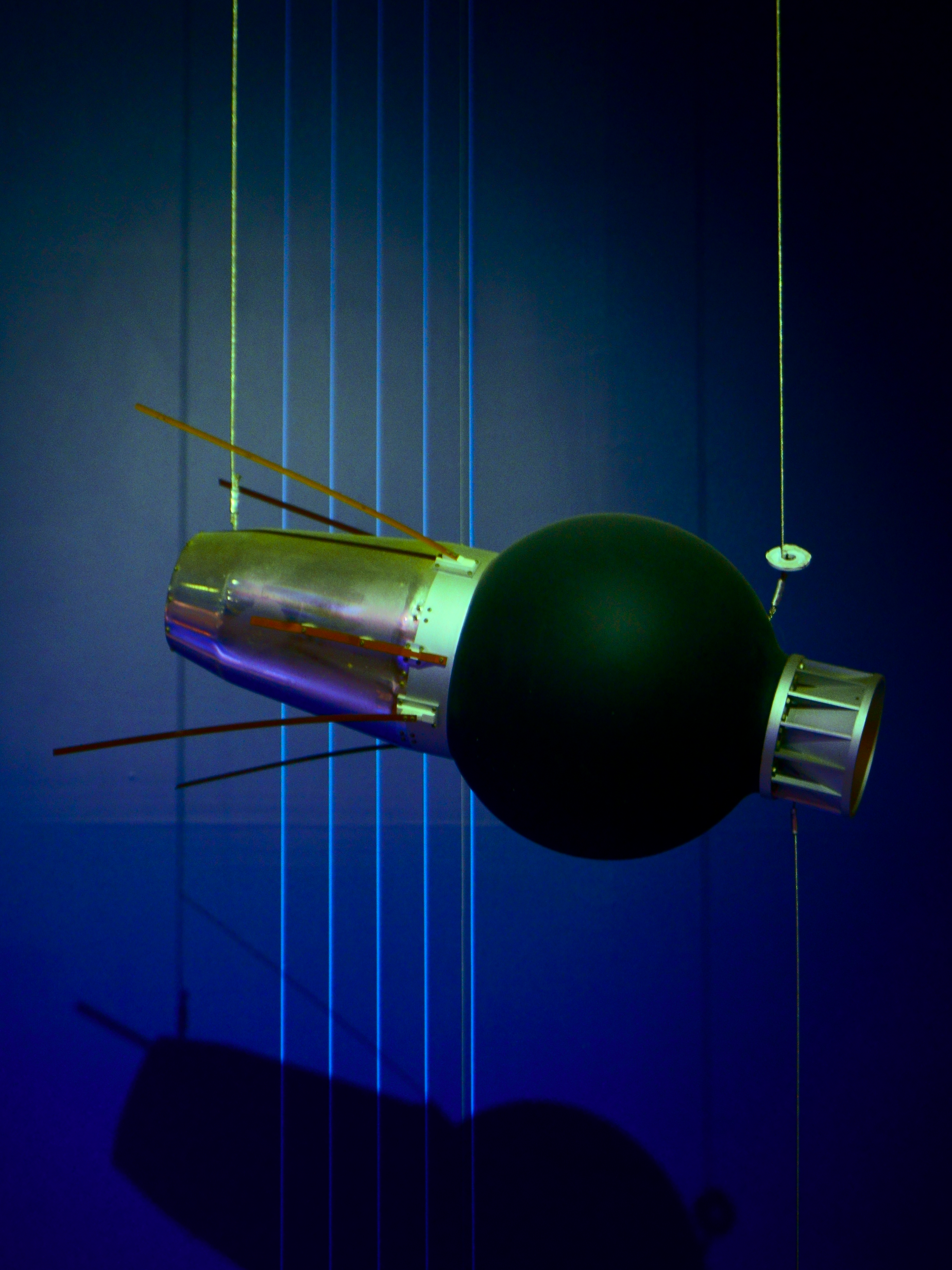
Scale model of the Osumi at Noshiro City Children's Center

The success of Ohsumi led to an era of space exploration for Japan and provided scientists with data used in assessing risks of later satellite launches and developments such as Hakucho, an x-ray satellite, and Hayabusa, the first spacecraft to collect asteroid samples. Additionally, Ohsumi's successful gravity turn maneuver led to the maneuver's use in the launch of scientific satellites with solid-fueled Mu carrier rockets.

== See also ==
- Timeline of artificial satellites and space probes
