= Hideo Itokawa =

Japanese scientist

- 糸川 英夫
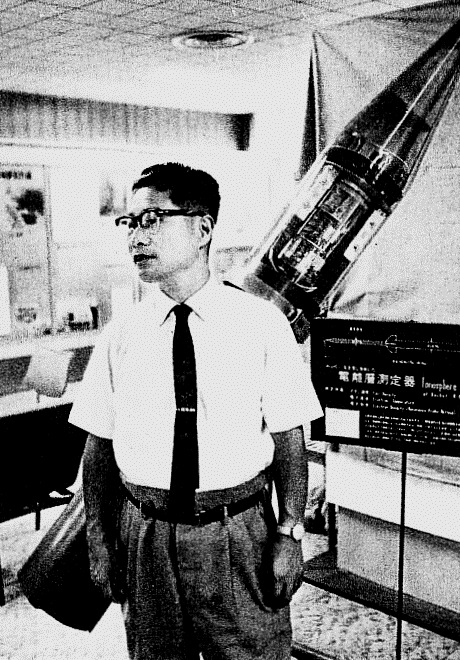
- Hideo Itokawa (1961)
- Born: July 20, 1912; Tokyo
- Died: February 21, 1999 (aged 86)
- Education: Tokyo Imperial University
- Known for: The father of Japanese space development
- Scientific career
- Fields: Rocketry
- Workplaces: University of Tokyo

Hideo Itokawa (糸川 英夫, Itokawa Hideo; July 20, 1912 – February 21, 1999) was a pioneer of Japanese rocketry, popularly known as "Dr. Rocket," and described in the media as the father of Japan's space development.

The near-Earth asteroid 25143 Itokawa was named in honor of Itokawa, and is notable as the target of the Hayabusa mission.

== Biography ==
Born in Tokyo, Itokawa skipped grades in school and graduated from the Tokyo Imperial University (University of Tokyo) in 1935, having majored in aeronautical engineering. In 1941, he became an assistant professor at the university. During World War II, he was involved in designing aircraft at the Nakajima Aircraft Company and designed the Nakajima Ki-43 Hayabusa ("peregrine falcon"; Allied reporting name "Oscar") fighter.

Itokawa became a full professor at his alma mater in 1948. In 1955, Itokawa worked on the Pencil Rocket for Japan's space program. He retired from his post at the university in 1967 and established an institute.

On 11 February 1970, a team formerly led by him at the Institute of Space and Aeronautical Science at the University of Tokyo succeeded in launching Japan's first satellite, Ohsumi, making the country the fourth nation in the world to have the capability to send objects into orbit with their own launch vehicles. The satellite was carried on a Lambda 4S rocket, a joint project by the Institute of Industrial Science at the university and Nissan.

Itokawa wrote 49 books, and was a best-selling author. Topics that Itokawa became interested in or took as a hobby, include such sports as basketball, golf and swimming, as well as orchestral arrangements and such instruments as cello, harmonica, organ, piano, violin and taishōgoto (a string instrument invented in Japan). He was also interested in baton twirling, brain waves, English language plays, Mah Jong, philosophy, rocket engineering and novel writing.

== Bibliography ==
- Gyakuten no Hasso
- Hachijussai no Aria
- Koya wo Yuku
