= S520 =

S520 may refer to:

- S-520, a Japanese sounding rocket
- Canon S520, a Canon S Series digital camera
- Coolpix S520, a 10 Megapixels Nikon Coolpix series digital camera
