= List of Japanese astronauts =

Fourteen citizens of Japan have participated in space flights. Of these, eleven— nine men and two women—were professional astronauts, two were space tourists, and one was a journalist who participated in a commercial Soyuz space flight.

Two Japanese astronauts have been in space at the same time on three occasions :

- Soichi Noguchi and Naoko Yamazaki from 5 April 2010 to 20 April 2010
- Soichi Noguchi and Akihiko Hoshide from 23 April 2021 to 2 May 2021
- Takuya Onishi and Kimiya Yui from 2 August 2025 to 7 August 2025

Six of the eleven professional astronauts have retired, while five (colored) remain in active service.

#	Name	Photo	Mission(s) (dates)	Launch times	Total duration	Spacewalk times	Spacewalk duration	Notes
1	Toyohiro Akiyama (Japanese: 秋山 豊寛) born 22 July 1942		Soyuz TM-11, 1990-12-02 - 1990-12-10	1	7 days 21 hours 54 minutes	0	0	The first journalist in space, first Japanese in space, first civilian on a commercial space flight, cosmonaut researcher, professor at Kyoto University of Art and Design
2	Mamoru Mohri (Japanese: 毛利 衛) born 29 January 1948		Endeavour STS-47, 1992-09-12 - 1992-09-20; Endeavour STS-99, 2000-02-11 - 2000-02-22	2	19 days 04 hours 08 minutes	0	0	The first Japanese astronaut of an official Japanese space program, Doctor of Science in Chemistry, Payload specialist, specialist in flying.
3	Chiaki Mukai (Japanese: 向井 千秋) born 6 May 1952		Columbia STS-65, 1994-07-08 - 1994-07-23; Discovery STS-95, 1998-10-29 - 1998-11-07	2	23 days 15 hours 39 minutes	0	0	The first Japanese female astronaut, cardiosurgeon, specialist in payload.
4	Koichi Wakata (Japanese: 若田 光一) born 1 August 1963		Endeavour STS-72, 1996-01-11 - 1996-01-20; Discovery STS-92, 2000-10-11 - 2000-10-24; Discovery STS-119, ISS-18, 19, 20, Endeavour STS-127, 2009-03-15 - 2009-07-31; Soyuz TMA-11M, ISS-38, 39, 2013-11-07 - 2014-05-14; SpaceX Crew-5, ISS-68, 69, 2022-10-05 - 2023-03-12	5	504 days 18 hours 33 minutes	2	14 hours 02 minutes	Flight specialist, flight engineer, commander of ISS-39.
5	Takao Doi (Japanese: 土井 隆雄) born 18 September 1954		Columbia STS-87, 1997-11-19 - 1997-12-05; Endeavour STS-123, 2008-03-11 - 2008-03-25	2	31 days 10 hours 45 minutes	2	12 hours 42 minutes	Doctor of Science in aerospace engineering Doctor of Astronomy; specialist in flying.
6	Soichi Noguchi (Japanese: 野口 聡一) born 15 April 1965		Discovery STS-114, 2005-07-26 - 2005-08-09; Soyuz TMA-17, ISS-22, 23, 2009-12-20 - 2010-06-02; SpaceX Crew-1, ISS-64, ISS-65	3	344 days 9 hours 33 minutes	3	20 hours 05 minutes	Aeronautical engineer, flight specialist, flight engineer.
7	Akihiko Hoshide (Japanese: 星出 彰彦) born 28 December 1968		Discovery STS-124, 2008-05-31 - 2008-06-14; Soyuz TMA-05M, ISS-32, 33, 2012-07-15 - 2012-11-19, SpaceX Crew-2, ISS-65, 2021-04-23 - 2021-11-09	3	340 days 11 hours 41 minutes	3	21 hours 03 minutes	Flight specialist, flight engineer.
8	Naoko Yamazaki (Japanese: 山崎 直子) born 27 December 1970		Discovery STS-131, 2010-04-05 - 2010-04-20	1	15 days 02 hours 47 minutes	0	0	Aeronautical engineer, specialist in flying.
9	Satoshi Furukawa (Japanese: 古川 聡) born 4 April 1964		Soyuz TMA-02M, ISS-28, 29, 2011-07-07 - 2011-11-22; SpaceX Crew-7, ISS-69 / 70, 2023-08-26 - 2024-03-12	2		0	0	Surgeon, flight engineer.
10	Kimiya Yui (Japanese: 油井 亀美也) born 30 January 1970		Soyuz TMA-17M, ISS-44, 45, 2015-07-22 - 2015-12-11 SpaceX Crew-11, ISS-73 / 74, 2025-07-31 - Present	2	711 days, 8 hours, 7 minutes (currently in space)	0	0	Colonel of the Air Force of Japan, flight engineer.
11	Takuya Onishi (Japanese: 大西 卓哉) born 22 December 1975		Soyuz MS-01, ISS-48, ISS49, 2016-07-07 - 2016-10-30; SpaceX Crew-10, ISS-72, ISS-73, 2025-03-14 - 2025-08-09	2	701 days, 12 hours, 5 minutes (currently in space)	0	0	Flight engineer.
12	Norishige Kanai (Japanese: 金井 宣茂) born 5 December 1976		Soyuz MS-07, ISS-54, 55, 2017-12-17 - 2018-06-03	1	168 days 05 hours 18 minutes	1	5 hours 57 minutes	Doctor, flight engineer.
13	Yusaku Maezawa (Japanese: 前澤 友作) born 22 November 1975		Soyuz MS-20, 2021-12-08 - 2021-12-20	1	11 days 10 hours 9 minutes	0	0	Space tourist
14	Yozo Hirano (Japanese: 平野 陽三) born 1985		Soyuz MS-20, 2021-12-08 - 2021-12-20	1	11 days 10 hours 9 minutes	0	0	Space tourist

== Future flights ==
#	Name	Photo	Mission(s) (dates)	Launch times	Total duration	Spacewalk times	Spacewalk duration	Notes

== See also ==
- Japanese space program
- JAXA
- Ellison Onizuka
- Daniel M. Tani
