= Pencil Rocket =

Japanese sounding rocket

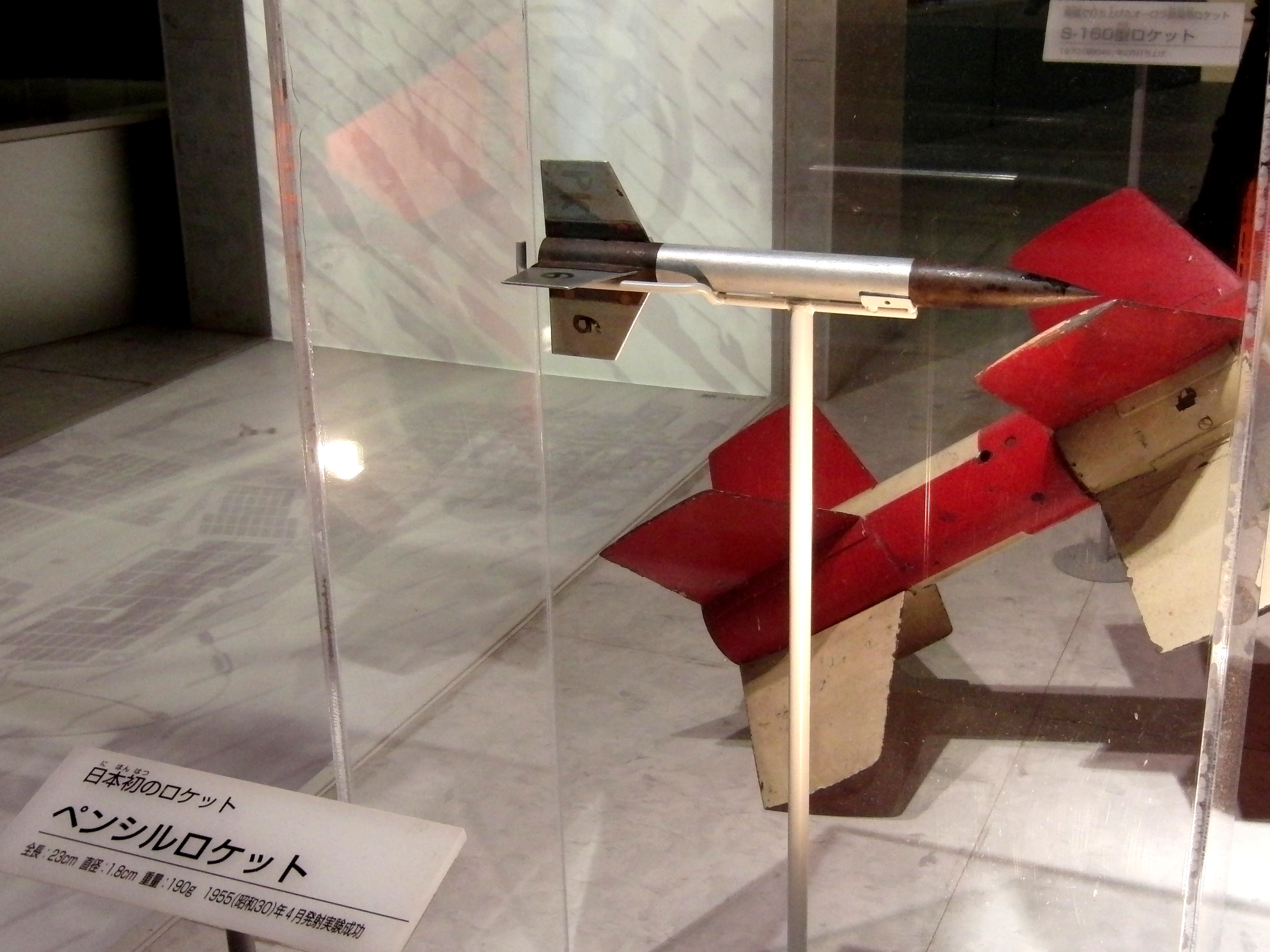
- Pencil Rocket. Exhibit in the National Museum of Nature and Science, Tokyo, Japan.
- Function: Technology demonstration
- Manufacturer: Avionics and Supersonic Aerodynamics
- Country of origin: Japan

Size
- Height: 23 cm (9.1 in)
- Diameter: 1.8 cm (0.71 in)
- Mass: 200 g (7.1 oz)
- Stages: 1

Launch history
- Status: Retired
- Total launches: 29
- First flight: 12 April 1955
- Last flight: 23 April 1955

The Pencil Rocket (ペンシルロケット, Penshiru roketto) was developed by the Avionics and Supersonic Aerodynamics (AVSA) research group in the early days of the Japanese space program. A prominent engineer on the project was Hideo Itokawa. The rocket was first launched on 12 April 1955. The dimensions were 23 cm in length by 1.8 cm in diameter, weighing 200 grams.

Development of the Pencil rocket system started in 1954 when Hideo Itokawa formed a center for rocket development at the University of Tokyo. In 1955, Itokawa's team, began conducting experimental launches of pencil-type rockets. The team launched 29 rockets over their course of these first experiments in space launch. Afterwards, the team expanded its focus to atmospheric observation with the larger Kappa 6 rocket.

== History ==
The Pencil's solid propellant was "double base", a smokeless gunpowder. After factory checks confirmed an internal burning pressure of 112 atm, a burning time of 63 milliseconds and a thrust of 29 kg, a horizontal test launch was carried out on 11 March 1955 at a gun firing pit in Kokubunji, Tokyo. This was followed on 12 April by an open firing test attended by people from government offices and the press. Launched horizontally from a 1.5 m launcher, the rocket flew through a series of thin-wired paper screens. These horizontal flight tests lasted ten days, and the results of all 29 flights were satisfactory. The Pencil is often described as Japan's first solid-fuel rocket, and it flew horizontally rather than vertically.
