= S-Series (rocket family) =

Japanese rocket fleet

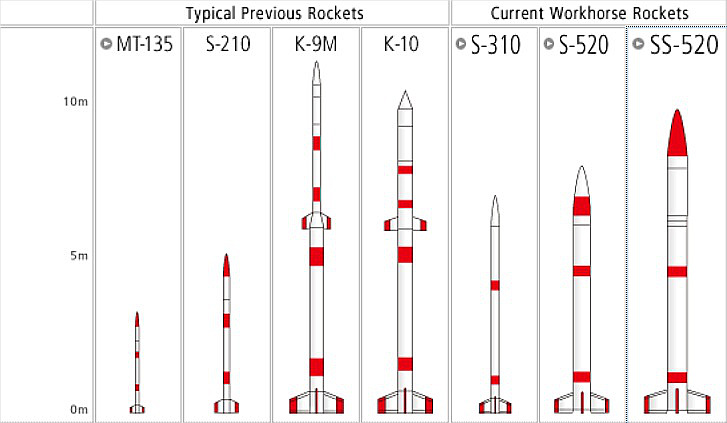
- Comparison of Japanese sounding rockets
- Function: Sounding rocket
- Manufacturer: IHI Aerospace
- Country of origin: Japan

S-Series is a fleet of sounding rockets funded by the Japan Aerospace Exploration Agency (JAXA) that have been in service since the late 1960s. Manufactured by IHI Aerospace and operated by the Institute of Space and Astronautical Science (ISAS). The nomenclature of the S-Series rockets is the number of "S"s indicates the number of stages, and the following number details the diameter of the craft in millimeters. For example, the S-310 is a single stage rocket with a diameter of 310 mm.

On January 14, 2017, the SS-520-4 rocket (modified sounding rocket) attempted to become the lightest and smallest launch vehicle to send a payload to orbit, however, the rocket failed to reach orbit. A second attempt was made on February 3, 2018. This time, the rocket reached orbit and successfully deployed TRICOM-1R (Tasuki), a 3U CubeSat. Its 2018 launch made it the smallest orbital rocket both in mass and height.

S-Series rocket family
Model	Gross mass	Height	Diameter	Apogee
S-210	300 kg (660 lb)	5.20 m (17.1 ft)	0.21 m (0.69 ft)	110 km (68 mi)
S-310	700 kg (1,540 lb)	6.80 m (22.30 ft)	0.31 m (1.01 ft)	190 km (110 mi)
S-520	2,300 kg (5,000 lb)	9.00 m (29.50 ft)	0.52 m (1.70 ft)	430 km (260 mi)
SS-520	2,600 kg (5,700 lb)	9.70 m (31.80 ft)	0.52 m (1.70 ft)	1,000 km (600 mi)

== S-160 ==
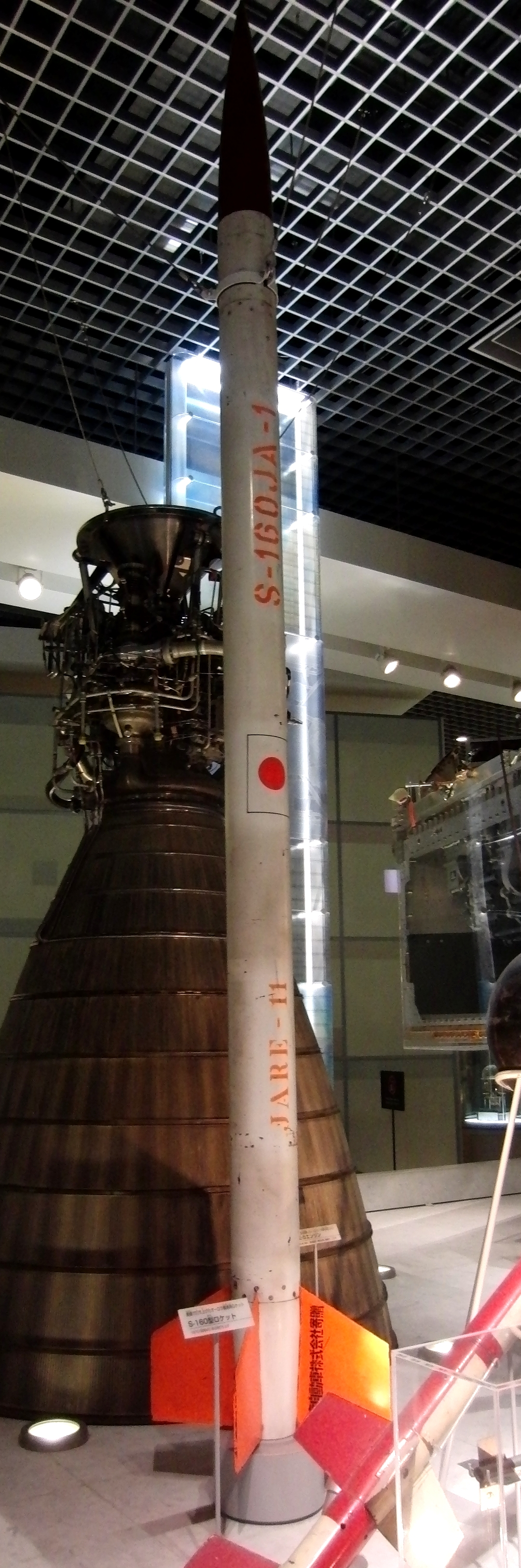
S-160 Rocket (S-160JA-1). Exhibit in the National Museum of Nature and Science, Tokyo

A retired single stage Japanese sounding rocket. The S-160 had a maximum flight altitude of 80 kilometers, a launch mass of 100 kg, a diameter of 160 mm and a length of 4 meters. It was launched 13 times between 1965 and 1972.

== S-210 ==
A retired single-stage sounding rocket developed by the Institute of Space and Aeronautical Science of the University of Tokyo, predecessor of the Institute of Space and Astronautical Science (ISAS), to study the ionosphere. A variant S-210JA was launched from Japan's Antarctic base. The first S-210 launch took place in 1966, and was retired in 1982. The first two launches of the full sized versions in took place between 1966 and 1967: they were both failures, with the motor case burning through. After redesign of the case and improved quality control the subsequent launch in August 1969 was successful. Following further successful tests in Japan in 1970–1971, the rocket was cleared for intensive use at the Japanese Antarctic base at Syowa in 1972–1978.

The S-210, like other rockets in the series, used a solid rocket motor. The propellant grain of the motor included Hydroxyl-terminated polybutadiene (HTPB) binder, making it better suited for the cold temperatures of the Antarctic launch site.

- Gross mass: 300 kg (660 lb)
- Height: 5.20 m (17.1 ft)
- Diameter: 0.21 m (0.69 ft)
- Apogee: 110 km (68 mi)

It was built to replace the smaller S-160 rocket which was a proof-of-concept design rocket.

== S-310 ==
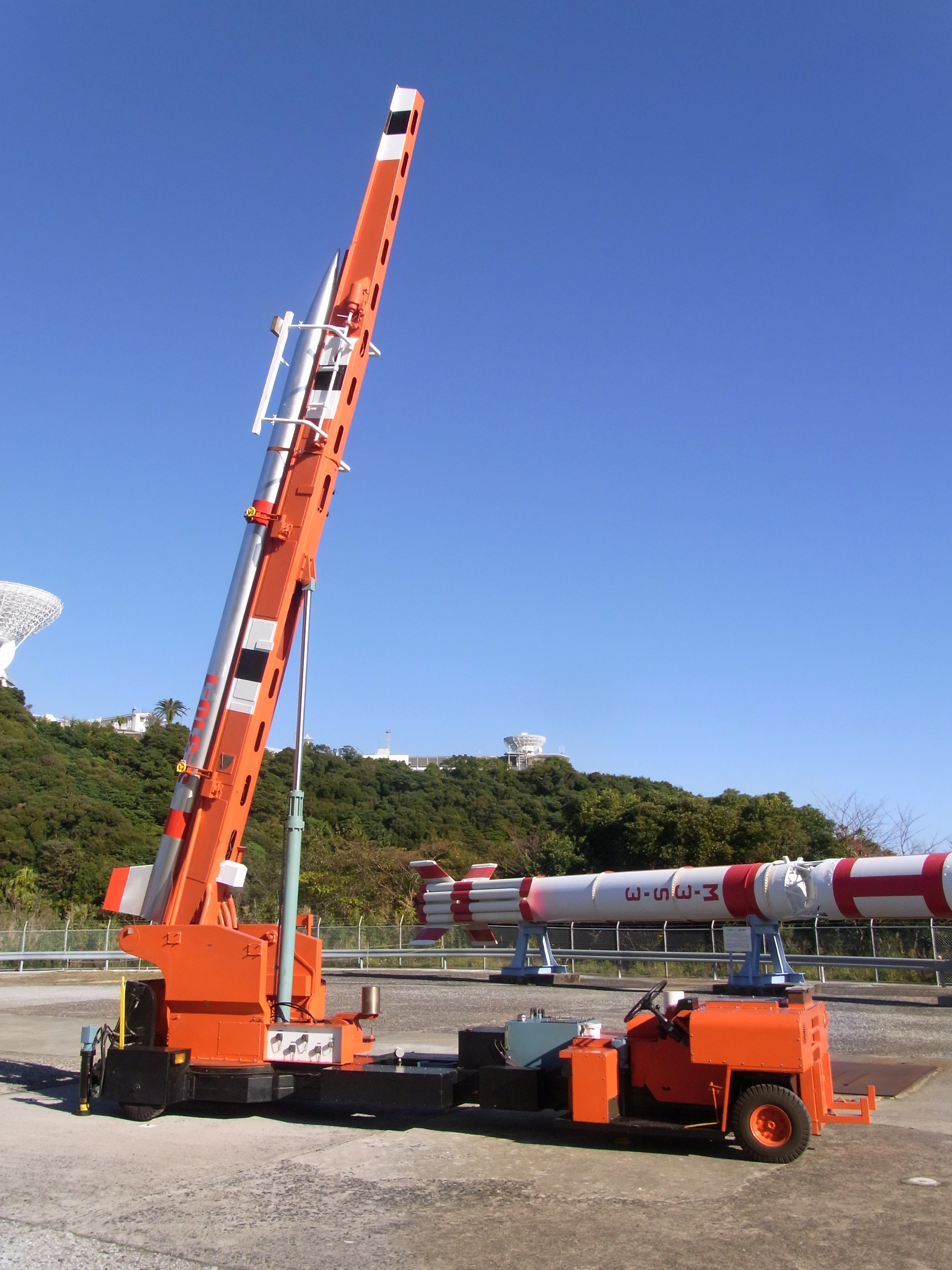
A full-scale model of the S-310 rocket No.1 set on a launcher. (JAXA/ISAS Uchinoura Space Center KS Center)

The S-310 is an active single-stage sounding rocket. Like its predecessor the S-210 it was developed for observations in Antarctica. The rocket is 310 mm in diameter, and can reach an altitude of 150 km. The first flight of S-310 in January 1975 was successful, and it has been launched at Kagoshima Space Center at Uchinoura, Showa Station in Antarctica and Andøya in Norway. As of January 10, 2020 the S-310 has completed 57 sub-orbital launches, with its most recent launch occurring on January 9, 2020.

- Gross mass: 700 kg (1,540 lb)
- Height: 6.80 m (22.30 ft)
- Diameter: 0.31 m (1.01 ft)
- Apogee: 190 km (110 mi)

== S-520 ==
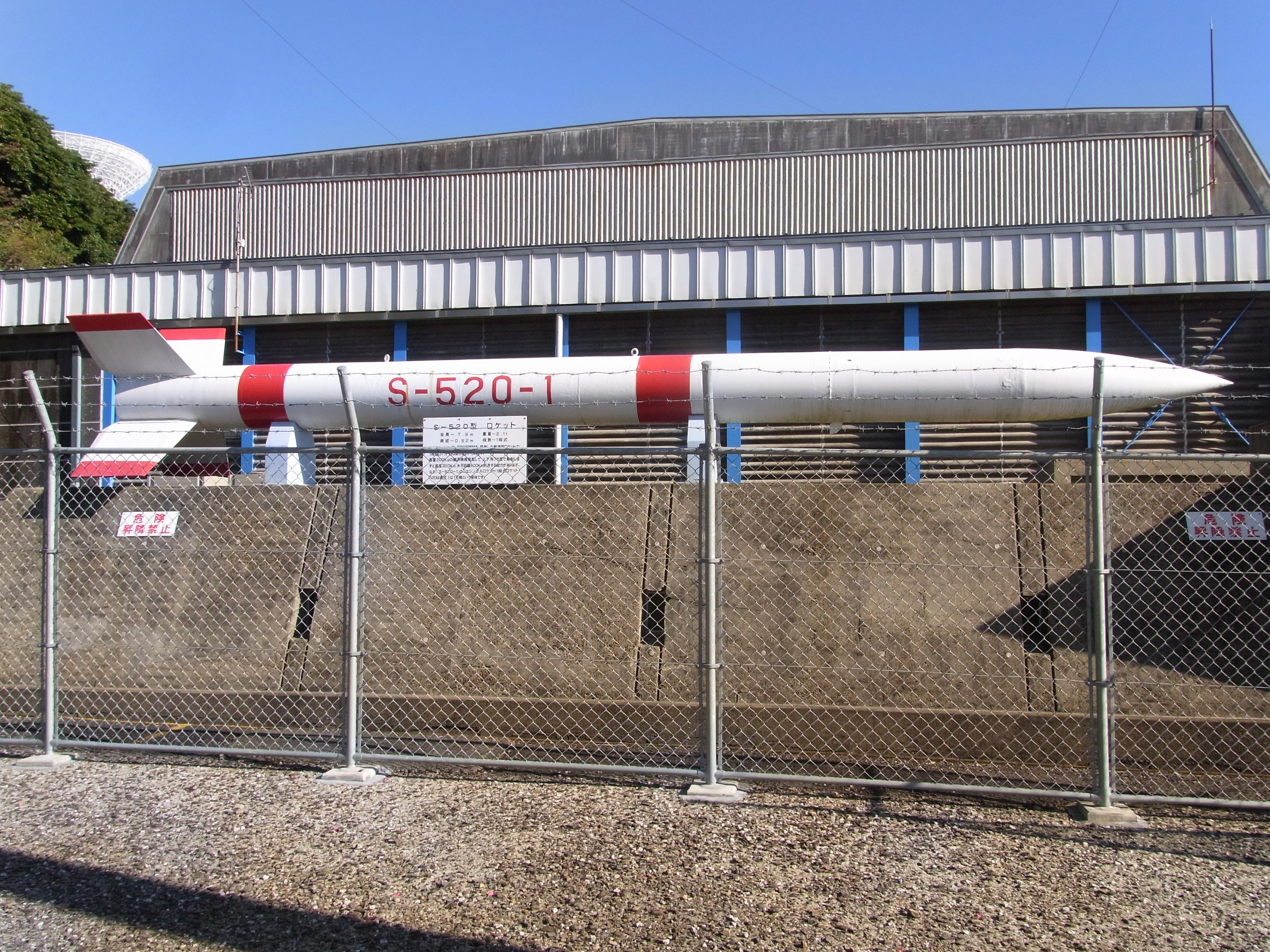
A full-scale model of the S-520 rocket No.1. (JAXA/ISAS Uchinoura Space Center KS Center)

The S-520 was developed to replace the K-9M and K-10 type sounding rockets. It is an active single-stage sounding rocket capable of launching a 100 kg payload above 300 km and provided more than five minutes of micro-gravity flight for experiments. The first launch took place in 1980, and most recently flew on 11 November 2024 (UTC).

- Gross mass: 2,300 kg (5,000 lb)
- Unfueled mass: 400 kg (880 lb)
- Burn time: 29 s
- Height: 9.00 m (29.50 ft)
- Diameter: 0.52 m (1.70 ft)
- Apogee: 430 km (260 mi)

== SS-520 ==
This version is a two-stage sounding rocket or three-stage orbital rocket, which uses S-520 as the first stage. Unlike the previous S-Series rockets, the SS-520 is intended to demonstrate how small an orbital launch vehicle can be.

When used as a suborbital sounding rocket, it can launch a 140 kilograms (310 lb) payload to an altitude between 800 and 1000 km. The first two SS-520s were launched in 1998 and 2000 respectively and successfully carried their payloads on sub-orbital missions.

After further development and the addition of a third stage, the fourth and fifth instances of the SS-520 were launched on full orbital trajectories.

- Gross mass: 2,600 kg (5,700 lb)
- Height: 9.70 m (31.80 ft)
- Diameter: 0.52 m (1.70 ft)
- Apogee: 1,000 km (600 mi)

=== SS-520-4 ===
This is the fourth vehicle configuration of the SS-520. It includes a small third stage, and is engineered to place the payload into an orbital speed of more than 27,000 km/h (17,000 mph), to put a 4 kg (8.8 lb) 3U CubeSat into a 180 km × 1,500 km (110 mi × 930 mi) orbit with an inclination of 31°. It is a technology demonstration with no serial production planned. It was launched January 14, 2017, but failed to reach orbit due to a loss of telemetry. If successful, it would have become the smallest and lightest vehicle to ever put an object in orbit; surpassing the Japanese Lambda-4S. Telemetry was lost 20 seconds into flight. 3 minutes into the flight, controllers sent an abort code commanding the second stage not to ignite after separation and the rocket fell into the ocean within the range safety area.

=== SS-520-5 ===
The second attempt at becoming the smallest orbital launching rocket was made on 3 February 2018. Liftoff from Uchinoura Space Center occurred at the opening of a ten-minute window at 14:03 local time (05:03 UTC), successfully deploying the TRICOM-1R CubeSat.

==== Specifications ====
- Height – 31 feet (9.54 meters)
- Weight – 2.9 tons (2.6 metric tons)
- Diameter – 20 inches (52 centimeters)
- Payload to Low-Earth Orbit – ~9 lbs (4 kg)

=== Launch history (SS-520 series) ===
Vehicle	Serial	Date (d/m/y)	Orbital/Suborbital	Launch pad	Payload	Outcome
SS-520	SS-520-1	5 February 1998	Suborbital	Kagoshima Space Center	ENA/EPS/LAP	Success
SS-520	SS-520-2	4 December 2000	Suborbital	Svalbard Rocket Range	Ion Outflow	Success
SS-520	SS-520-4	14 January 2017	Orbital	Kagoshima Space Center	TRICOM-1	Failed to reach orbit
SS-520	SS-520-5	3 February 2018	Orbital	Kagoshima Space Center	TRICOM-1R (Tasuki)	Success
SS-520	SS-520-3	4 November 2021	Suborbital	Svalbard Rocket Range	Ion Outflow (GCI Cusp)	Success
