= Lambda (rocket family) =

Series of Japanese rockets

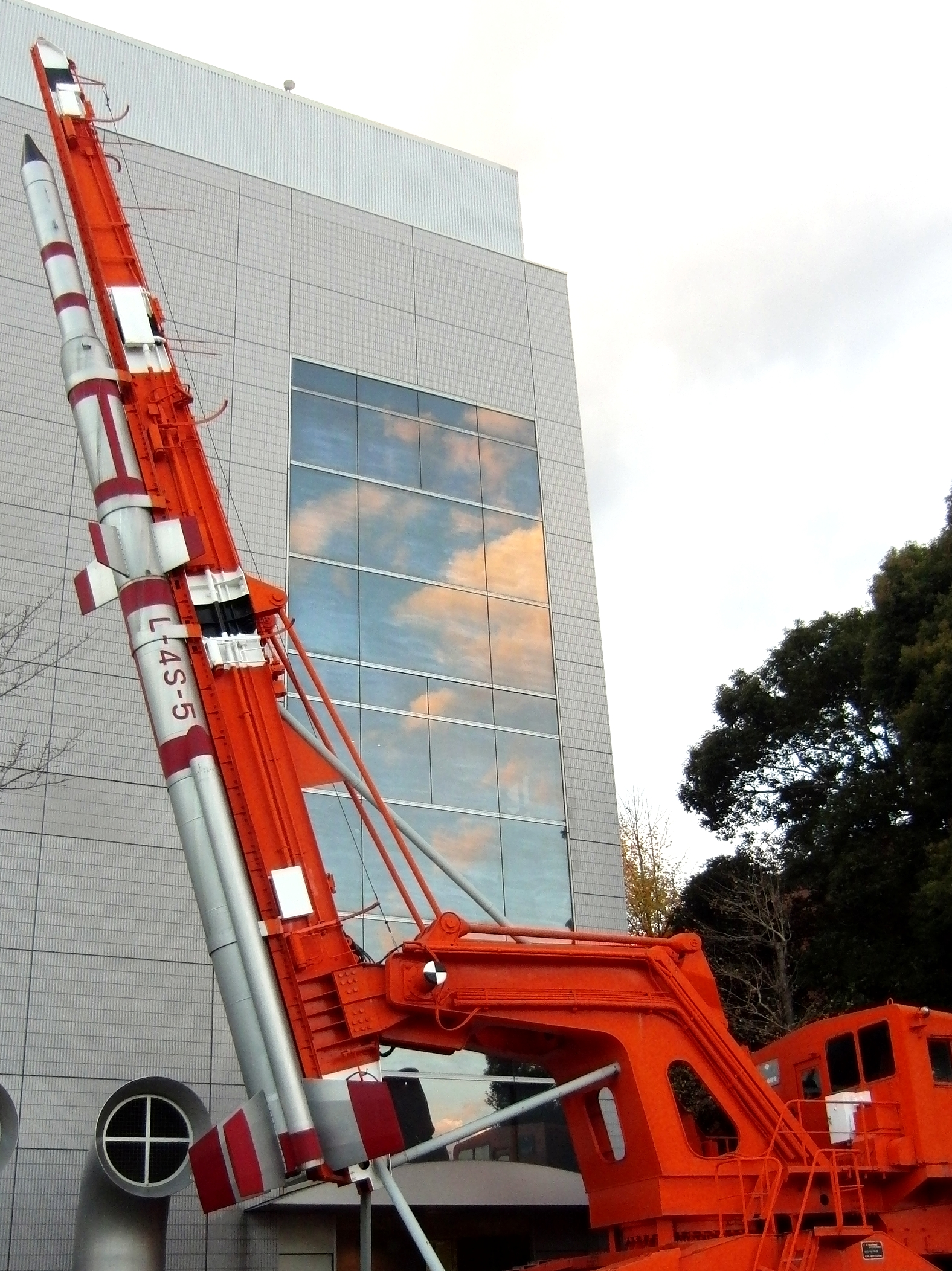
Lambda 4S (replica) and the launcher as exhibited at National Museum of Nature and Science.

Lambda is the name of a family of Japanese carrier rockets. It consisted of the types Lambda 2, Lambda 3, Lambda 3H, Lambda 4S, Lambda 4SC, and Lambda 4T developed jointly by Institute of Industrial Science of the University of Tokyo, Institute of Space and Astronautical Science of the University of Tokyo, and Prince Motor Company, which merged with Nissan in 1966.

Lambda series rockets did not have guidance systems, as they had the potential to be converted for offensive military use, thus interpreted as a violation of Article 9 of the Japanese Constitution. However, future Japanese launch vehicles, such as the H-II, were allowed to have guidance systems.

== Configurations ==
Lambda types differ regarding the upper stages used. The following table shows the actual configurations:

Type	Boosters	Stage 1	Stage 2	Stage 3	Stage 4	Ref.
2	—N/a	L-735	K-420	—N/a	—N/a	
3	—N/a	L-735	K-420	Kappa-8	—N/a	
3H	—N/a	L-735	L-735(1/3)	L-500	—N/a	
4S	2 × SB-310	L-735	L-735(1/3)	L-500	L-480S	
4SC	2 × SB-310	L-735	L-735(1/3)	L-500	L-480S	
4T	2 × SB-310	L-735	L-735(1/3)	L-500	L-480S	

== Launches ==
Lambda rockets were launched by ISAS, from Kagoshima pad L.

On February 11, 1970, the first Japanese satellite Ohsumi was launched using a Lambda 4S rocket.

The Lambda 4S was launched nine times, though five were failures. The first launch of the Lambda 4S rocket took place on September 26, 1966, from Kagoshima. A fourth-stage attitude control failed resulting in loss of the vehicle and payload.

List of Lambda launches
Date	Version	Apogee	Mission
1963 August 24	2	51 km (32 mi)	Failure
1963 December 11	2	410 km (250 mi)	Ionosphere mission
1964 July 11	3	857 km (533 mi)	Ionosphere mission
1965 January 31	3	1,040 km (650 mi)	Ionosphere mission
1965 March 18	3	1,085 km (674 mi)	X-ray astronomy mission
1966 March 5	3H	1,829 km (1,136 mi)	X-ray astronomy mission
1966 July 23	3H	1,800 km (1,100 mi)	Gyro-plasma probe Ionosphere / aeronomy mission
1966 September 26	4S	400 km (250 mi)	Ohsumi launch attempt. Failure: Fourth stage attitude control failed
1966 December 20	4S	400 km (250 mi)	Ohsumi launch attempt. Failure: Fourth stage failed to ignite
1967 February 6	3H	2,150 km (1,340 mi)	Ionosphere / chemical release / x-ray astronomy mission
1967 April 13	4S	200 km (120 mi)	Ohsumi launch attempt. Failure: Fourth stage failed to ignite
1969 January 16	3H	1,800 km (1,100 mi)	Ionosphere mission
1969 September 3	4T	400 km (250 mi)	Test mission
1969 September 22	4S	400 km (250 mi)	Ohsumi launch attempt. Failure: Fourth stage control system malfunction after third stage collided with fourth stage
1970 January 21	3H	1,848 km (1,148 mi)	Ionosphere / plasma mission
1970 February 11	4S	2,440 km (1,520 mi)	Ohsumi (first successful satellite of Japan, fifth attempt of Lambda 4S)
1970 September 19	3H	2,017 km (1,253 mi)	X-ray / ultraviolet astronomy mission
1971 August 20	4SC	1,500 km (930 mi)	Failure
1971 September 3	3H	1,718 km (1,068 mi)	Aeronomy / ionosphere / x-ray astronomy mission
1973 January 28	4SC	1,500 km (930 mi)	TVC test
1974 January 22	3H	1,571 km (976 mi)	St 2: 329 km X-ray astronomy mission
1974 September 1	4SC	1,500 km (930 mi)	TVC test
1976 August 30	4SC	1,500 km (930 mi)	Radar transponder
1977 August 16	3H	1,294 km (804 mi)	Aeronomy / ionosphere / plasma mission
1979 September 20	4SC	82 km (51 mi)	TVC test
