= Lambda 4S =

Expendable carrier rocket

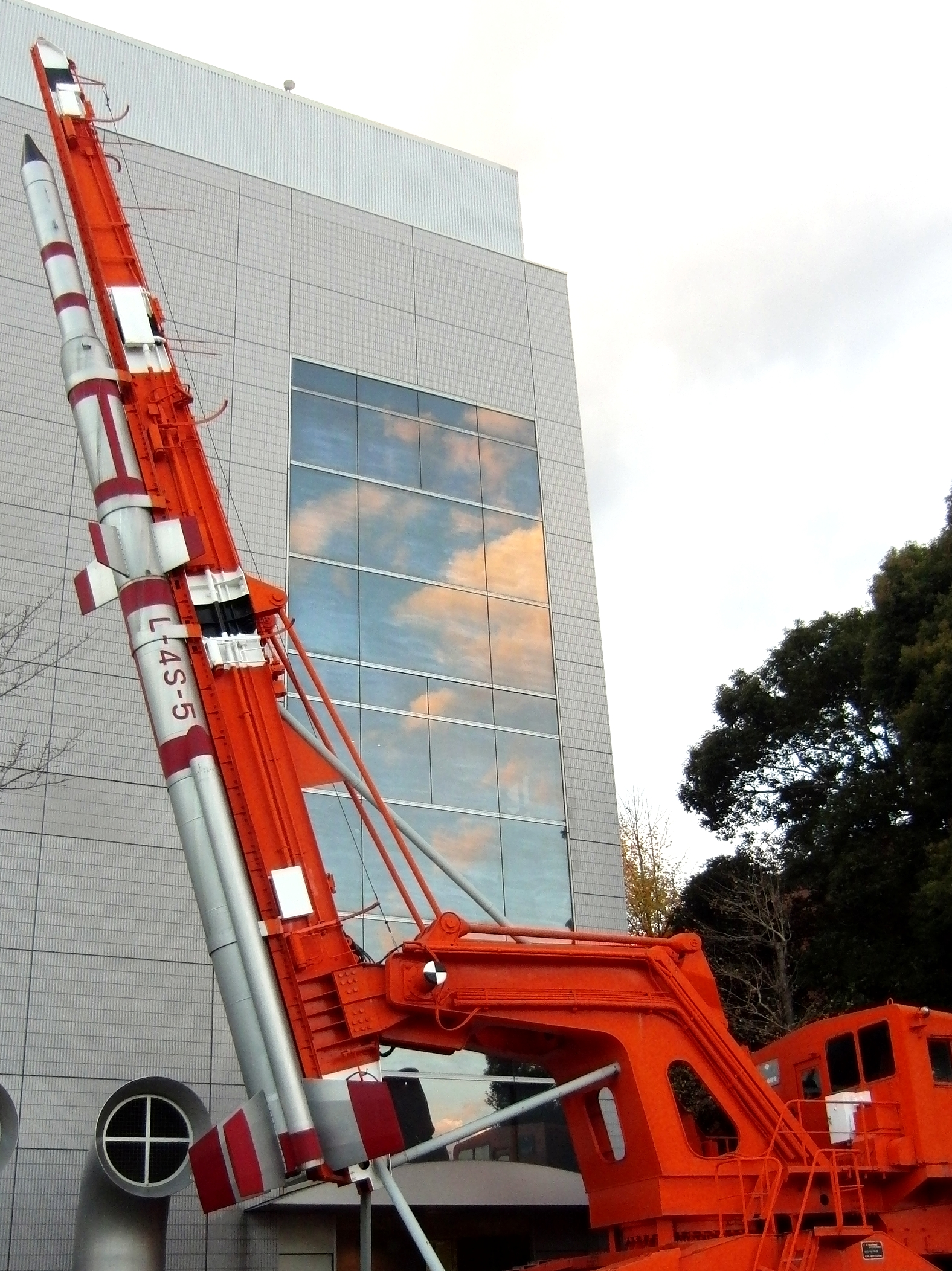
- A model of the L-4S-5 rocket at the National Museum of Nature and Science in Tokyo
- Function: Experimental carrier rocket
- Manufacturer: ISAS; Nissan
- Country of origin: Japan

Size
- Height: 16.5 metres (54 ft)
- Diameter: 0.74 metres (2 ft 5 in)
- Mass: 9,400 kilograms (20,700 lb)
- Stages: 4

Capacity

Payload to LEO
- Mass: 26 kilograms (57 lb)

Associated rockets
- Family: Lambda
- Derivative work: Lambda 4SC

Launch history
- Status: Retired
- Launch sites: Kagoshima Pad L
- Total launches: 5
- Success(es): 1
- Failure: 4
- First flight: 26 September 1966
- Last flight: 11 February 1970
- Carries passengers or cargo: Ohsumi

The Lambda 4S or L-4S was an experimental Japanese expendable carrier rocket. It was produced by Nissan and the Institute of Space and Astronautical Science and launched five times between 1966 and 1970 with Ohsumi technology demonstration satellites. The first four launches failed, however the fifth, launched on 11 February 1970, successfully placed Ohsumi-5, the first Japanese satellite, into orbit.

The Lambda 4S consisted of four stages, with two booster rockets augmenting the first stage. SB-310 rockets were used as boosters, with an L735 first stage. The second stage was a reduced length derivative of the L735, whilst an L500 was used as the third stage. The fourth stage was an L480S. All four stages burned solid propellant.

The Lambda 4S could place 26 kilograms (57 lb) of payload into low Earth orbit. It was launched from the Kagoshima Space Centre. Following its retirement in 1970, a sounding rocket derived from it, the Lambda 4SC, flew three times in order to test technologies for the Mu rockets to follow. The Mu replaced Lambda for orbital launches.

== See also ==
- Comparison of orbital launchers families
- Comparison of orbital launch systems
