= Institute of Industrial Science =

University of Tokyo institute

Institute of Industrial Science, University of Tokyo
- 東京大学生産技術研究所
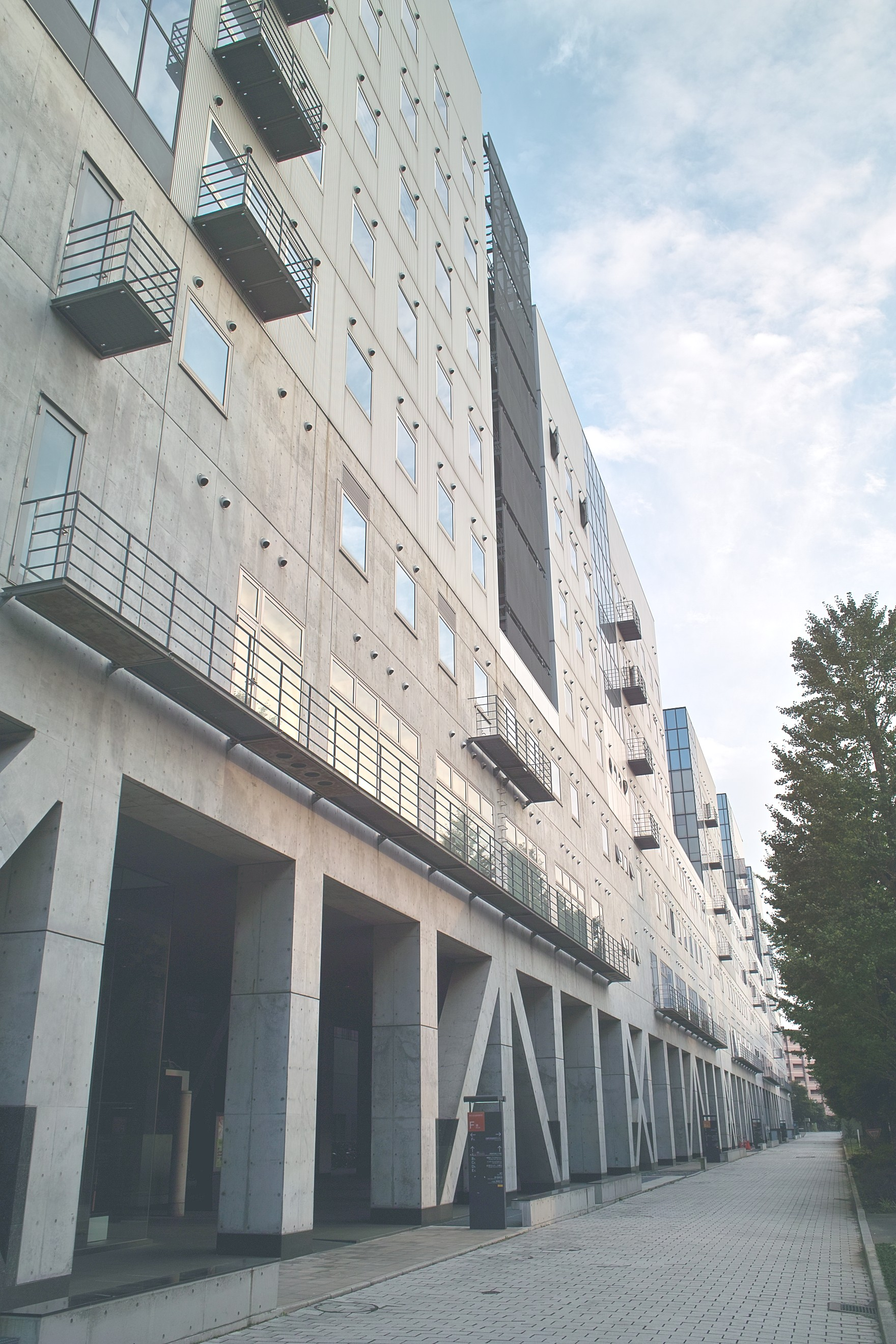
- Type: Institute within the University of Tokyo
- Established: 1942 (as the Second Faculty of Engineering); 1949 (current form)
- Location: Meguro, Tokyo, Japan
- Website: https://www.iis.u-tokyo.ac.jp/en/

The Institute of Industrial Science (usually abbreviated as IIS) is an institute within the University of Tokyo (UTokyo). The institute conducts 'scientific and comprehensive research of industrial production and the practical application of research findings'. It covers almost every field in engineering, and has a focus on collaboration with the private sector. Although the institute operates in close liaison with the School of Engineering, they are separate entities.

The institute shares the phase II portion of the Komaba Campus with the Research Center for Advanced Science and Technology. The main building of the institute stretches 200 metres from north to south and is eight storeys tall. It was designed by Hiroshi Hara, a professor in the Department of Architecture at UTokyo.

== Organisation ==
All of the over 120 research laboratories belong to one of the following five divisions:

- Informatics and Electronics
- Materials and Environmental Science
- Human and Social Systems
- Fundamental Engineering
- Mechanical and Biofunctional Systems

== History ==
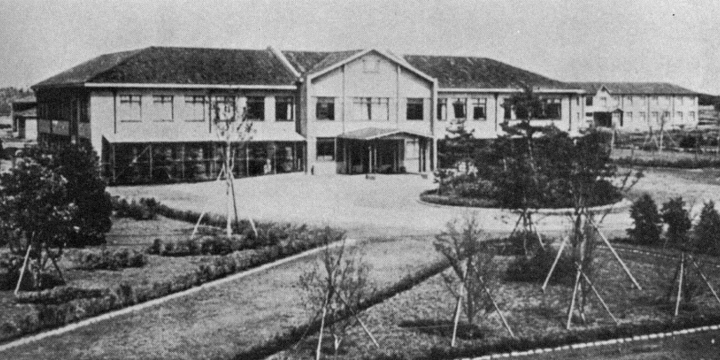
Makeshift buildings of the Second Faculty of Engineering in Chiba

IIS originated as the Second Faculty of Engineering (第二工学部), which was established to meet the increased demand for engineers during the Second World War. Yuzuru Hiraga, 1st Baron Hiraga, who was president of the university when the war broke out, was the primary advocate of this idea, and the faculty opened in makeshift buildings on the newly built Chiba campus just a year later, in 1942. The faculty was funded 50% each by the Navy and Army, which meant the primary focus of it was placed on military research.

The faculty was closed after the war, and IIS was established as its successor. In 1962, IIS relocated to the former headquarters of the Third Infantry Regiment in Roppongi, though some large experimental equipment remained in Chiba. As Japan's economy rapidly recovered from the devastation of the war and became the world's second-largest economy in the 1960s, the institute collaborated closely with major manufacturing companies. These collaborations covered a range of fields, from research on efficient iron mills to telecommunications and space rocket development.

IIS moved from Roppongi to Komaba in 2001, and its former site is now occupied by the National Art Center.
